= Bács-Kiskun County 3rd constituency =

Hungarian national legislative constituency

Bács-Kiskun County 3rd constituency (Kalocsa)
- Constituency for the National Assembly
- Location of Bács-Kiskun county 03 within Bács-Kiskun county

- Location of Bács-Kiskun county within Hungary
- County: Bács-Kiskun
- Electorate: 66,063 (2018)
- Major settlements: Kalocsa

Current constituency
- Created: 2011
- Party: TISZA
- Member: Zsolt Judák
- Created from: Constituency no. 6; Constituency no. 7; Constituency no. 4
- Elected: 2026
- Coordinates: 46°32′00″N 18°59′08″E

The 3rd constituency of Bács-Kiskun County (Hungarian: Bács-Kiskun megyei 03. számú országgyűlési egyéni választókerület) is one of the single member constituencies of the National Assembly, the national legislature of Hungary. The constituency standard abbreviation: Bács-Kiskun 03. OEVK.

Since 2026, it has been represented by Zsolt Judák of the Tisza Party.

== Geography ==
The 3rd constituency is located in the western part of Bács-Kiskun County.

=== List of municipalities ===
The constituency includes the following municipalities:

1. Akasztó
2. Apostag
3. Bátya
4. Csengőd
5. Drágszél
6. Dunaegyháza
7. Dunapataj
8. Dunaszentbenedek
9. Dunatetétlen
10. Dunavecse
11. Foktő
12. Géderlak
13. Harta
14. Homokmégy
15. Kalocsa
16. Kaskantyú
17. Kiskőrös
18. Miske
19. Ordas
20. Öregcsertő
21. Páhi
22. Solt
23. Soltszentimre
24. Soltvadkert
25. Szakmár
26. Tabdi
27. Újsolt
28. Újtelek
29. Uszód

== History ==
The current 3rd constituency of Bács-Kiskun County was created in 2011 and contains the pre-2011 6th and 7th constituencies and part of the pre-2011 4th constituency of Bács-Kiskun County. Its borders have not changed since its creation.

== Members ==
The constituency was first represented by Sándor Font of the Fidesz from 2014, and he was re-elected in 2018 and 2022. In the 2026 election, Zsolt Judák of the Tisza Party was elected representative.

Election	Member	Party	%	Ref.
2014	Sándor Font	Fidesz	50.84	
2018	Sándor Font	Fidesz	53.22	
2022	Sándor Font	Fidesz	59.70	
2026	Zsolt Judák	Tisza Party	50.63	
