= Bács-Kiskun County 4th constituency =

Hungarian national legislative constituency

Bács-Kiskun County 4th constituency (Kiskunfélegyháza)
- Constituency for the National Assembly
- Location of Bács-Kiskun county 04 within Bács-Kiskun county

- Location of Bács-Kiskun county within Hungary
- County: Bács-Kiskun
- Electorate: 71,615 (2022)
- Major settlements: Kiskunfélegyháza

Current constituency
- Created: 2011
- Party: TISZA
- Member: Gyula Kovács
- Elected: 2026
- Coordinates: 46°42′18″N 19°51′00″E

The 4th constituency of Bács-Kiskun County (Hungarian: Bács-Kiskun megyei 04. számú országgyűlési egyéni választókerület) is one of the single member constituencies of the National Assembly, the national legislature of Hungary. The constituency standard abbreviation: Bács-Kiskun 04. OEVK.

Since 2026, it has been represented by Gyula Kovács of the Tisza Party.

== Geography ==
The 4th constituency is located in eastern part of Bács-Kiskun County.

=== List of municipalities ===
The constituency includes the following municipalities:

1. Ágasegyháza
2. Bócsa
3. Bugac
4. Bugacpusztaháza
5. Csólyospálos
6. Fülöpjakab
7. Fülöpszállás
8. Gátér
9. Izsák
10. Jakabszállás
11. Jászszentlászló
12. Kiskunfélegyháza
13. Kiskunmajsa
14. Kömpöc
15. Kunszállás
16. Lakitelek
17. Móricgát
18. Nyárlőrinc
19. Orgovány
20. Pálmonostora
21. Petőfiszállás
22. Szank
23. Tiszaalpár
24. Tiszaug

== Members ==
The constituency was first represented by Sándor Lezsák of the Fidesz from 2014, and he was re-elected in 2018 and 2022. In the 2026 election, Gyula Kovács of the Tisza Party was elected representative.

Election	Member	Party	%	Ref.
2014	Sándor Lezsák	Fidesz	53.34	
2018	Sándor Lezsák	Fidesz	60.21	
2022	Sándor Lezsák	Fidesz	62.97	
2026	Gyula Kovács	Tisza Party	50.70	
