= Kiskunmajsa District =

Coordinates: 46.4833°N 19.7167°E

Kiskunmajsa District Kiskunmajsai járás
- Districts of Hungary
- Coat of arms

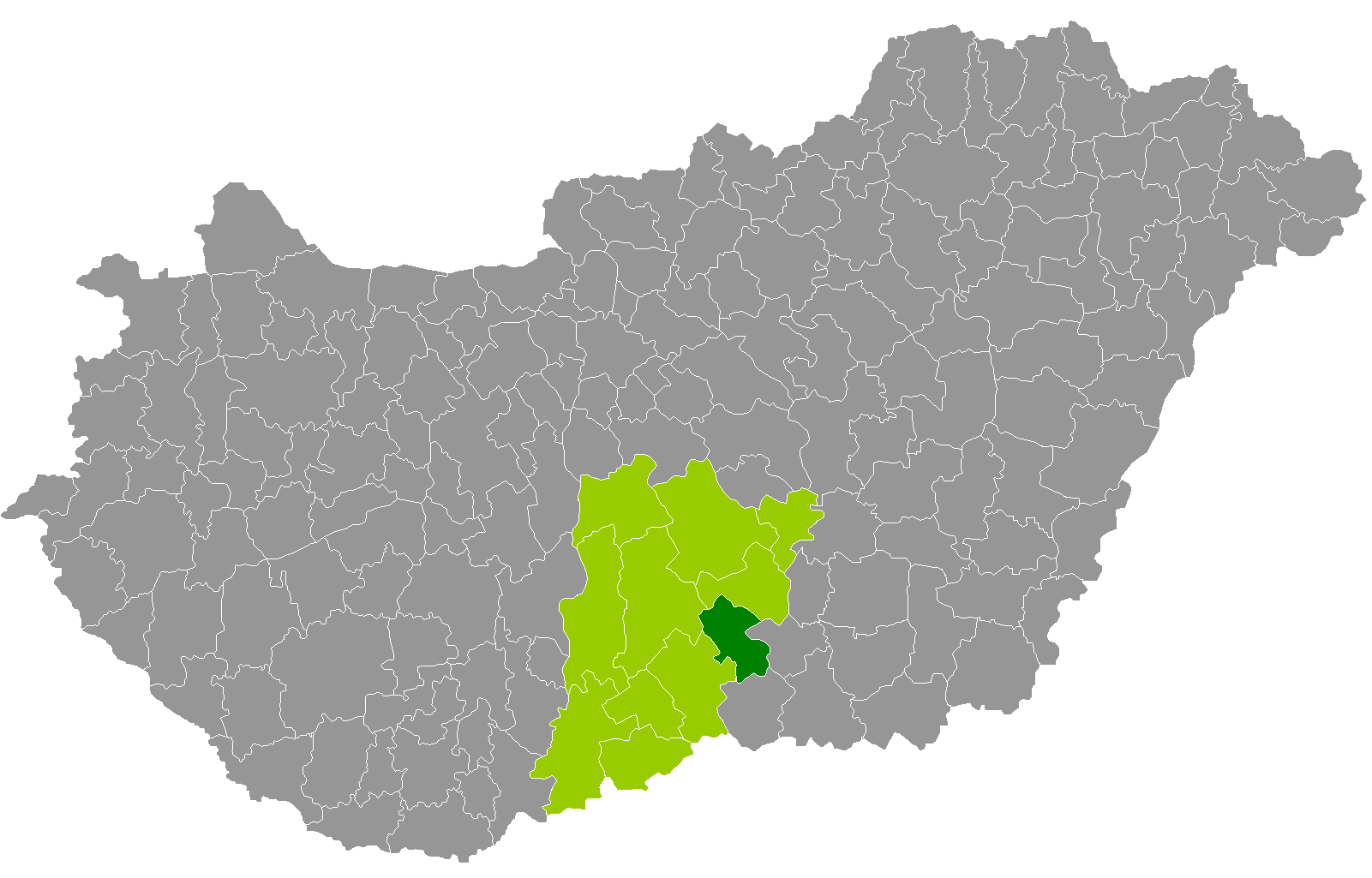
- Kiskunmajsa District within Hungary and Bács-Kiskun County.
- Country: Hungary
- County: Bács-Kiskun
- District seat: Kiskunmajsa

Area
  - Total: 485.13 km^{2} (187.31 sq mi)
  - Rank: 9th in Bács-Kiskun

Population (2011 census)
  - Total: 18,908
  - Rank: 10th in Bács-Kiskun
  - Density: 39/km^{2} (100/sq mi)

Kiskunmajsa (Hungarian: Kiskunmajsai járás) is a district in eastern part of Bács-Kiskun County. Kiskunmajsa is also the name of the town where the district seat is found. The district is located in the Southern Great Plain Statistical Region.

== Geography ==
Kiskunmajsa District borders with Kiskunfélegyháza District to the north, Kistelek District (Csongrád County) to the east, Mórahalom District (Csongrád County) to the south, Kiskunhalas District and Kiskőrös District to the west. The number of the inhabited places in Kiskunmajsa District is 6.

== Municipalities ==
The district has 1 town and 5 villages. (ordered by population, as of 1 January 2012)

- Csólyospálos (1,658)
- Jászszentlászló (2,458)
- **Kiskunmajsa** (11,766) – district seat
- Kömpöc (698)
- Móricgát (479)
- Szank (2,370)

The bolded municipality is a city.

== Demographics ==
Religion in Kiskunmajsa District (2011 census)
1. Catholic Church (69.5%)
2. Calvinism (3.40%)
3. Lutheranism (0.40%)
4. Other religions (1.30%)
5. Non-religious (7.40%)
6. Atheists (0.30%)
7. Undeclared (17.7%)

In 2011, it had a population of 18,908 and the population density was 39/km^{2}.

Year	County population	Change
2011	18,908	n/a

=== Ethnicity ===
Besides the Hungarian majority, the main minorities are the Roma (approx. 800) and German (200).

Total population (2011 census): 18,908
Ethnic groups (2011 census): Identified themselves: 18,558 persons:

- Hungarians: 17,271 (93.06%)
- Gypsies: 829 (4.47%)
- Germans: 213 (1.15%)
- Others and indefinable: 245 (1.32%)

Approx. 500 persons in Kiskunmajsa District did not declare their ethnic group at the 2011 census.

=== Religion ===
Religious adherence in the county according to 2011 census:

- Catholic – 13,135 (Roman Catholic – 13,116; Greek Catholic – 14);
- Reformed – 639;
- Evangelical – 74;
- other religions – 259;
- Non-religious – 1,395;
- Atheism – 52;
- Undeclared – 3,354.

== Gallery ==
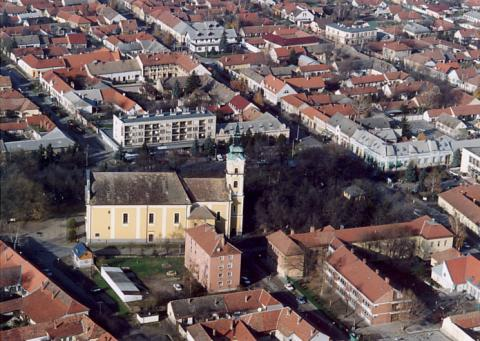
Kiskunmajsa, the district seat

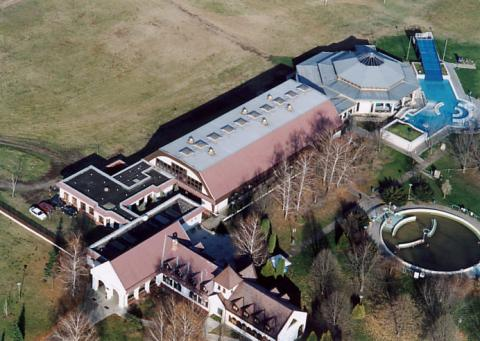
Jóna Thermal Bath in Kiskunmajsa

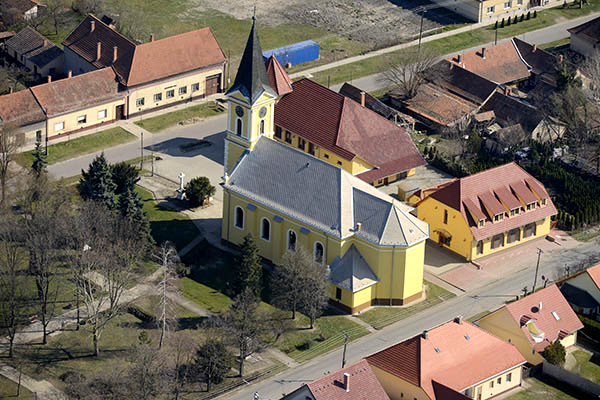
Aerial view of Jászszentlászló

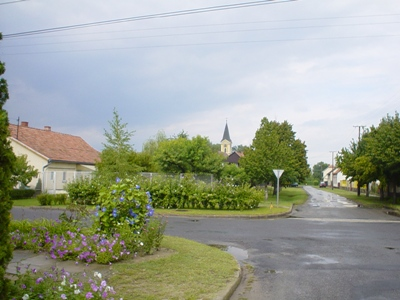
View of Jászszentlászló

== See also ==
- [[List of cities and towns{{}} of Hungary]]
