= List of populated places in Hungary (U–Ú) =

This is a list of cities, towns and villages of Hungary

KEY: T = Town ; V = Village

Name	Rank	County	District	Population	Post code
Udvar	V	Baranya	Mohácsi	181	7718
Udvari	V	Tolna	Tamási	515	7066
Ugod	V	Veszprém	Pápai	1,528	8564
Újbarok	V	Fejér	Bicskei	350	2066
Újcsanálos	V	Borsod-Abaúj-Zemplén	Szerencsi	881	3716
Újdombrád	V	Szabolcs-Szatmár-Bereg	Kisvárdai	693	4491
Újfehértó	T	Szabolcs-Szatmár-Bereg	Nagykállói	13,722	4244
Újhartyán	V	Pest	Dabasi	2,742	2367
Újiráz	V	Hajdú-Bihar	Berettyóújfalui	576	4146
Újireg	V	Tolna	Tamási	371	7095
Újkenéz	V	Szabolcs-Szatmár-Bereg	Kisvárdai	1,075	4635
Újkér	V	Gyor-Moson-Sopron	Sopron–Fertodi	1,079	9472
Újkígyós	V	Békés	Gyulai	5,686	5661
Újlengyel	V	Pest	Dabasi	1,733	2724
Újléta	V	Hajdú-Bihar	Hajdúhadházi	1,093	4288
Újlorincfalva	V	Heves	Füzesabonyi	4,809	3387
Újpetre	V	Baranya	Siklósi	1,172	7766
Újrónafo	V	Gyor-Moson-Sopron	Mosonmagyaróvári	829	9244
Újsolt	V	Bács-Kiskun	Kunszentmiklói	172	6320
Újszalonta	V	Békés	Sarkadi	157	5727
Újszász	T	Jász-Nagykun-Szolnok	Szolnoki	6,951	5052
Újszentiván	V	Csongrád	Szegedi	1,588	6754
Újszentmargita	V	Hajdú-Bihar	Polgári	1,591	4065
Újszilvás	V	Pest	Ceglédi	2,663	2768
Újtelek	V	Bács-Kiskun	Kalocsai	497	6337
Újtikos	V	Hajdú-Bihar	Polgári	956	4096
Újudvar	V	Zala	Nagykanizsai	1,009	9200
Újvárfalva	V	Somogy	Kaposvári	389	7436
Ukk	V	Veszprém	Sümegi	356	8347
Und	V	Gyor-Moson-Sopron	Sopron–Fertodi	347	9464
Úny	V	Komárom-Esztergom	Dorogi	650	2528
Uppony	V	Borsod-Abaúj-Zemplén	Ózdi	392	3622
Ura	V	Szabolcs-Szatmár-Bereg	Csengeri	739	4763
Uraiújfalu	V	Vas	Sárvári	932	9651
Úrhida	V	Fejér	Székesfehérvári	1,680	8142
Úri	V	Pest	Monori	2,669	2244
Úrkút	V	Veszprém	Ajkai	2,219	8409
Uszka	V	Szabolcs-Szatmár-Bereg	Fehérgyarmati	333	4952
Uszód	V	Bács-Kiskun	Kalocsai	1,096	6332
Uzsa	V	Veszprém	Tapolcai	365	8321

== Notes ==
- Cities marked with * have several different post codes, the one here is only the most general one.
