= Kiskunfélegyháza District =

Coordinates: 46.6833°N 19.8167°E

Kiskunfélegyháza District Kiskunfélegyházi járás
- Districts of Hungary
- Flag Coat of arms

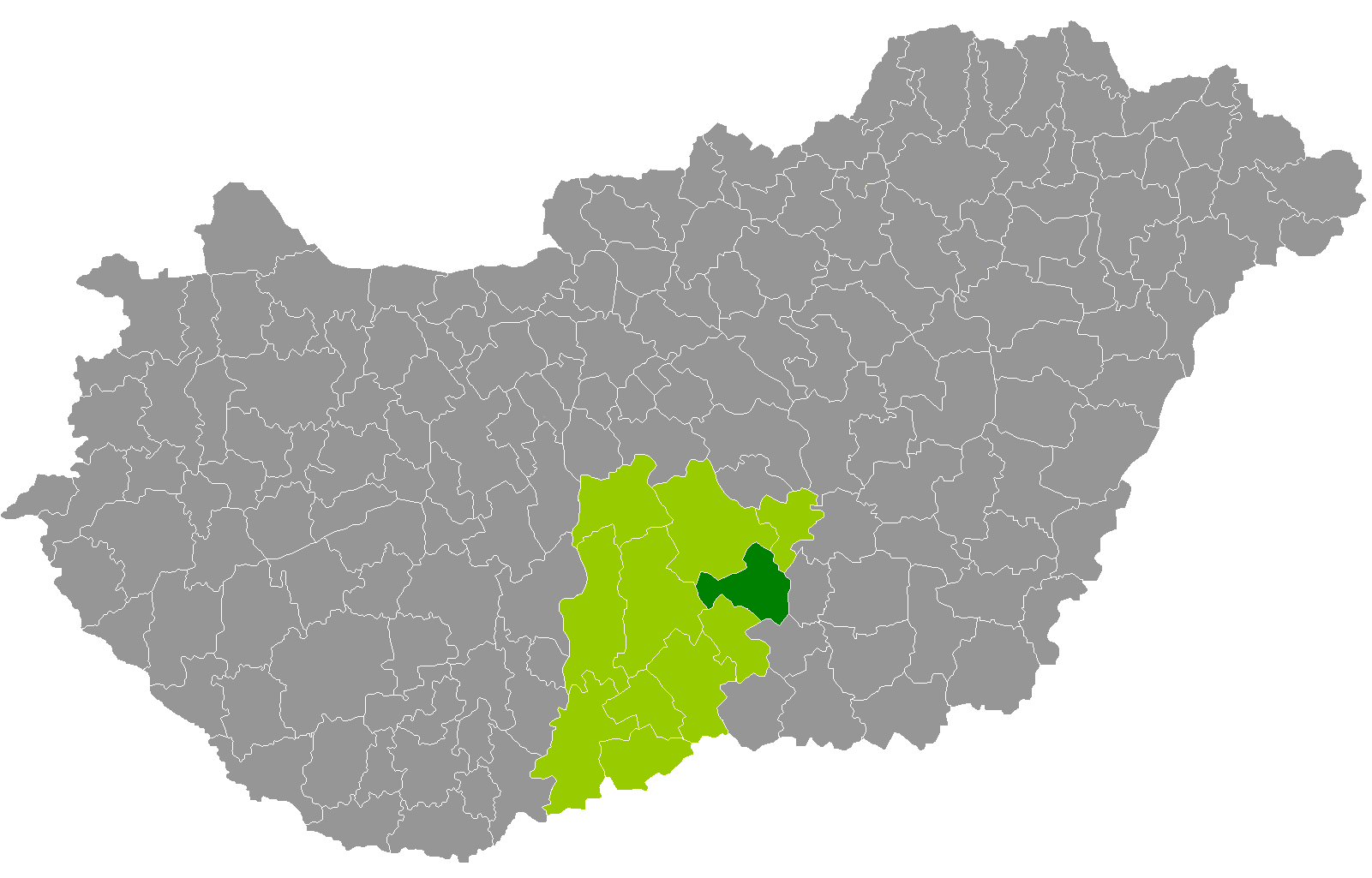
- Kiskunfélegyháza District within Hungary and Bács-Kiskun County.
- Country: Hungary
- County: Bács-Kiskun
- District seat: Kiskunfélegyháza

Area
  - Total: 582.37 km^{2} (224.85 sq mi)
  - Rank: 7th in Bács-Kiskun

Population (2011 census)
  - Total: 37,455
  - Rank: 6th in Bács-Kiskun
  - Density: 64/km^{2} (170/sq mi)

Kiskunfélegyháza (Hungarian: Kiskunfélegyházi járás) is a district in eastern part of Bács-Kiskun County. Kiskunfélegyháza is also the name of the town where the district seat is found. The district is located in the Southern Great Plain Statistical Region.

== Geography ==
Kiskunfélegyháza District borders with Kecskemét District and Tiszakécske District to the north, Csongrád District (Csongrád County) to the east, Kistelek District (Csongrád County) and Kiskunmajsa District to the south, Kiskőrös District to the west. The number of the inhabited places in Kiskunfélegyháza District is 6.

== Municipalities ==
The district has 1 town, 1 large village and 4 villages. (ordered by population, as of 1 January 2012)

- Bugac (2,809)
- Bugacpusztaháza (297)
- Gátér (966)
- **Kiskunfélegyháza** (29,972) – district seat
- Pálmonostora (1,770)
- Petőfiszállás (1,478)

The bolded municipality is city, italics municipality is large village.

== Demographics ==
Religion in Kiskunfélegyháza District (2011 census)
1. Catholic Church (60.0%)
2. Greek Catholicism (0.20%)
3. Calvinism (2.40%)
4. Lutheranism (0.20%)
5. Other religions (0.90%)
6. Non-religious (9.40%)
7. Atheists (0.70%)
8. Undeclared (26.2%)

In 2011, it had a population of 37,455 and the population density was 64/km².

Year	County population	Change
2011	37,455	n/a

=== Ethnicity ===
Besides the Hungarian majority, the main minorities are the Roma (approx. 300), German (200) and Romanian (100).

Total population (2011 census): 37,455
Ethnic groups (2011 census): Identified themselves: 33,240 persons:

- Hungarians: 32,326 (97.25%)
- Others and indefinable: 914 (2.75%)

Approx. 4,000 persons in Kiskunfélegyháza District did not declare their ethnic group at the 2011 census.

=== Religion ===
Religious adherence in the county according to 2011 census:

- Catholic – 22,542 (Roman Catholic – 22,464; Greek Catholic – 72);
- Reformed – 899;
- Evangelical – 74;
- other religions – 349;
- Non-religious – 3,512;
- Atheism – 276;
- Undeclared – 9,803.

== Gallery ==
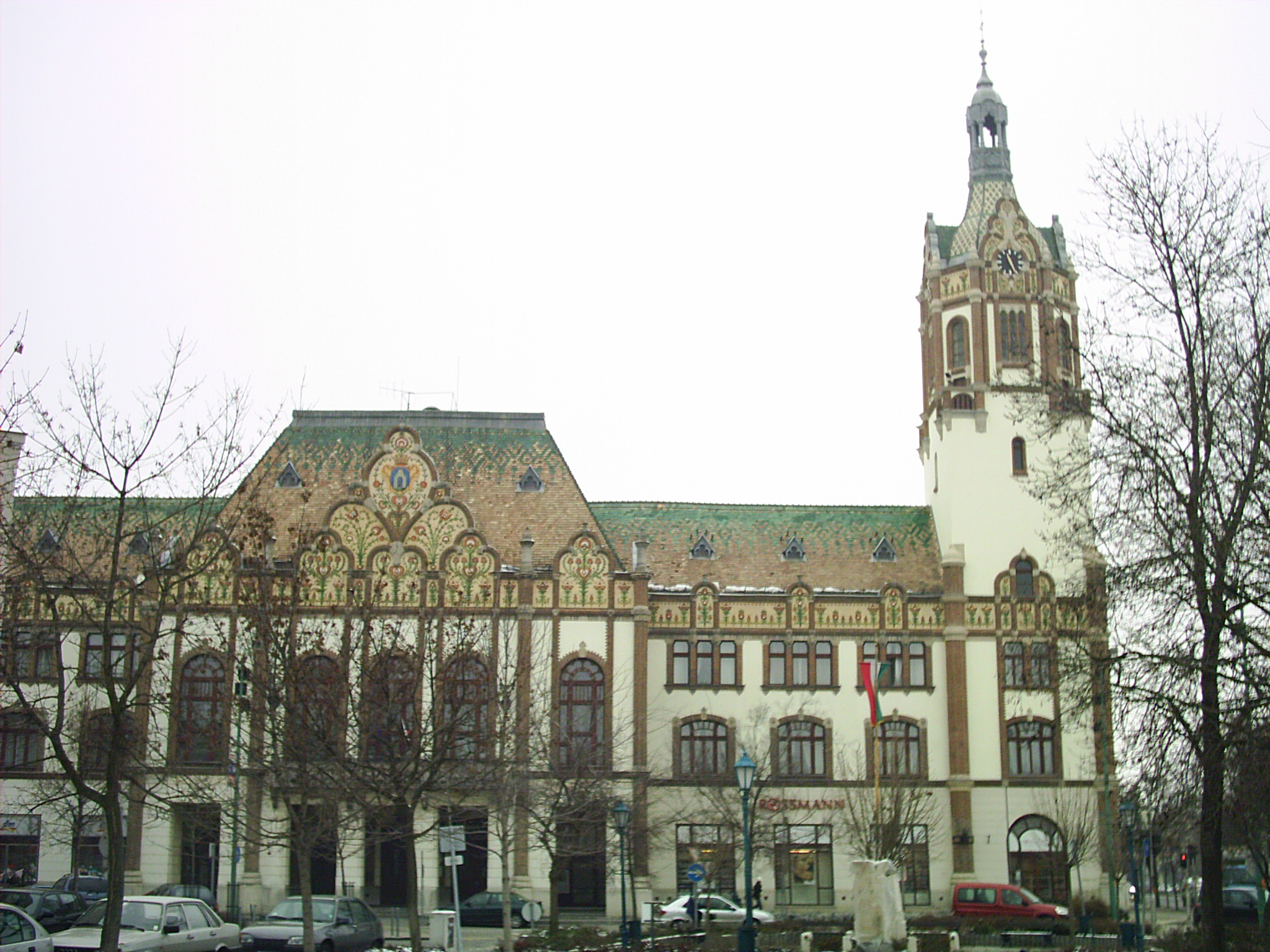
Kiskunfélegyháza, Town Hall

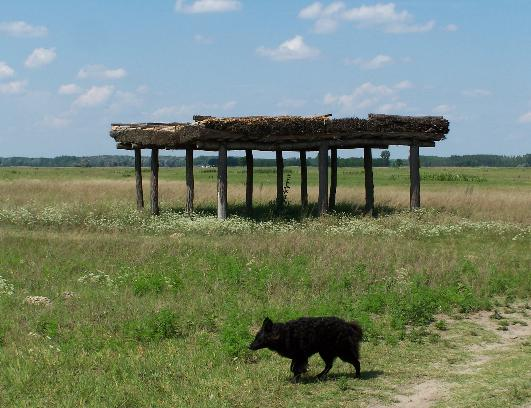
Landscape near Bugac

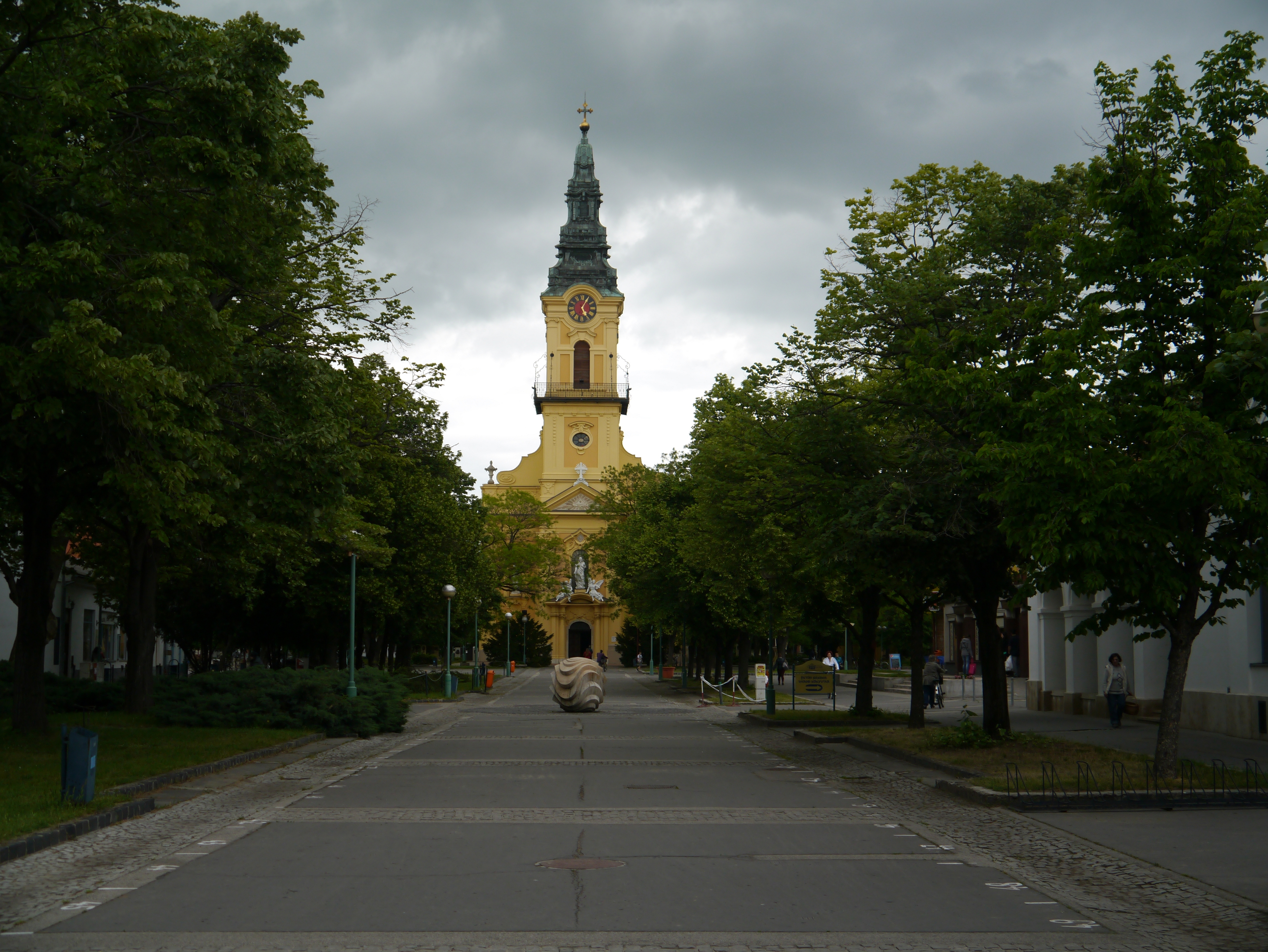
Our Lady Church in Kiskunfélegyháza

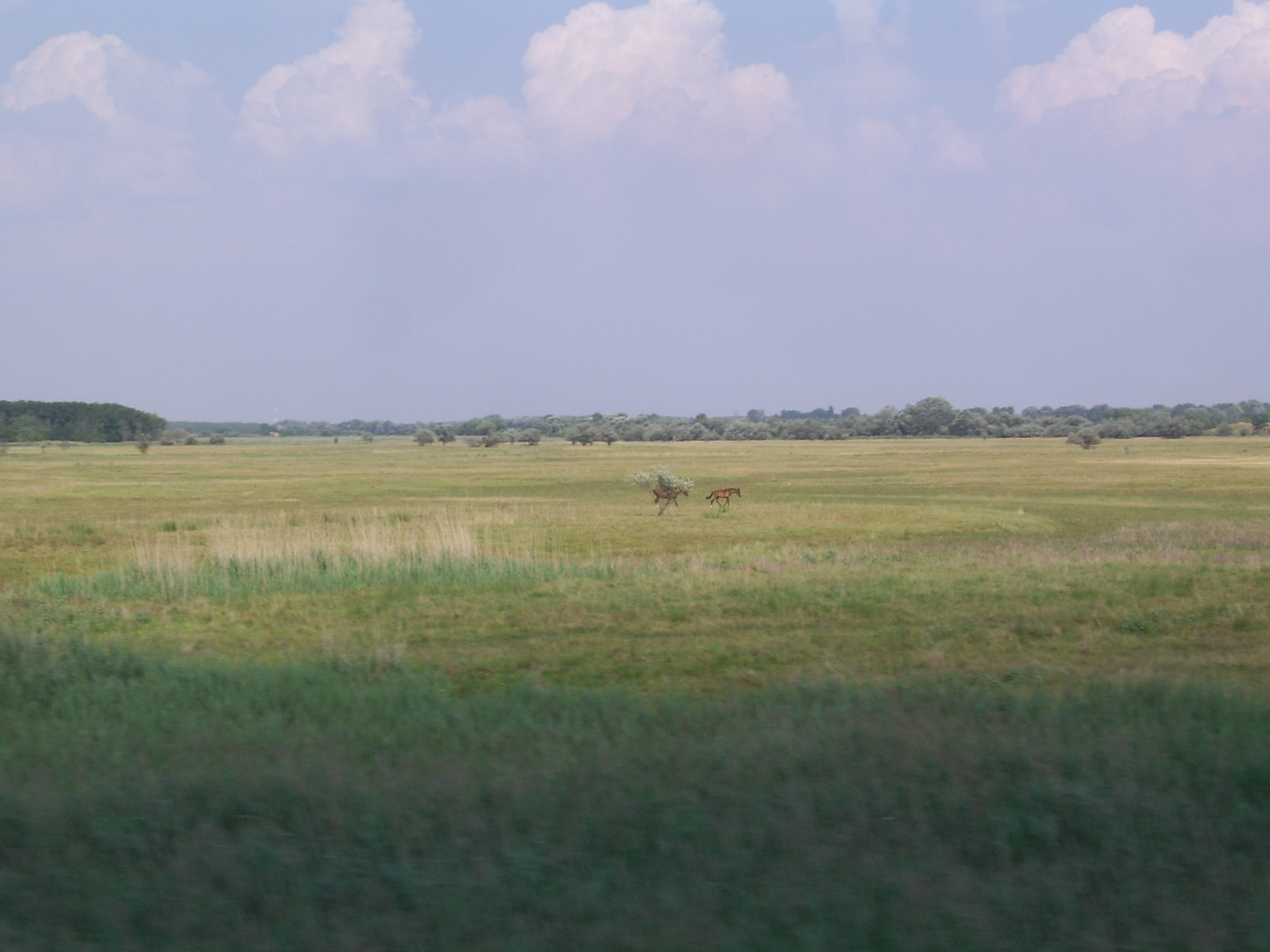
Pusztaorság near Petőfiszállás

== See also ==
- List of cities and towns of Hungary
