= Jánoshalma District =

Coordinates: 46.2833°N 19.3000°E

Jánoshalma District Jánoshalmai járás
- Districts of Hungary
- Coat of arms

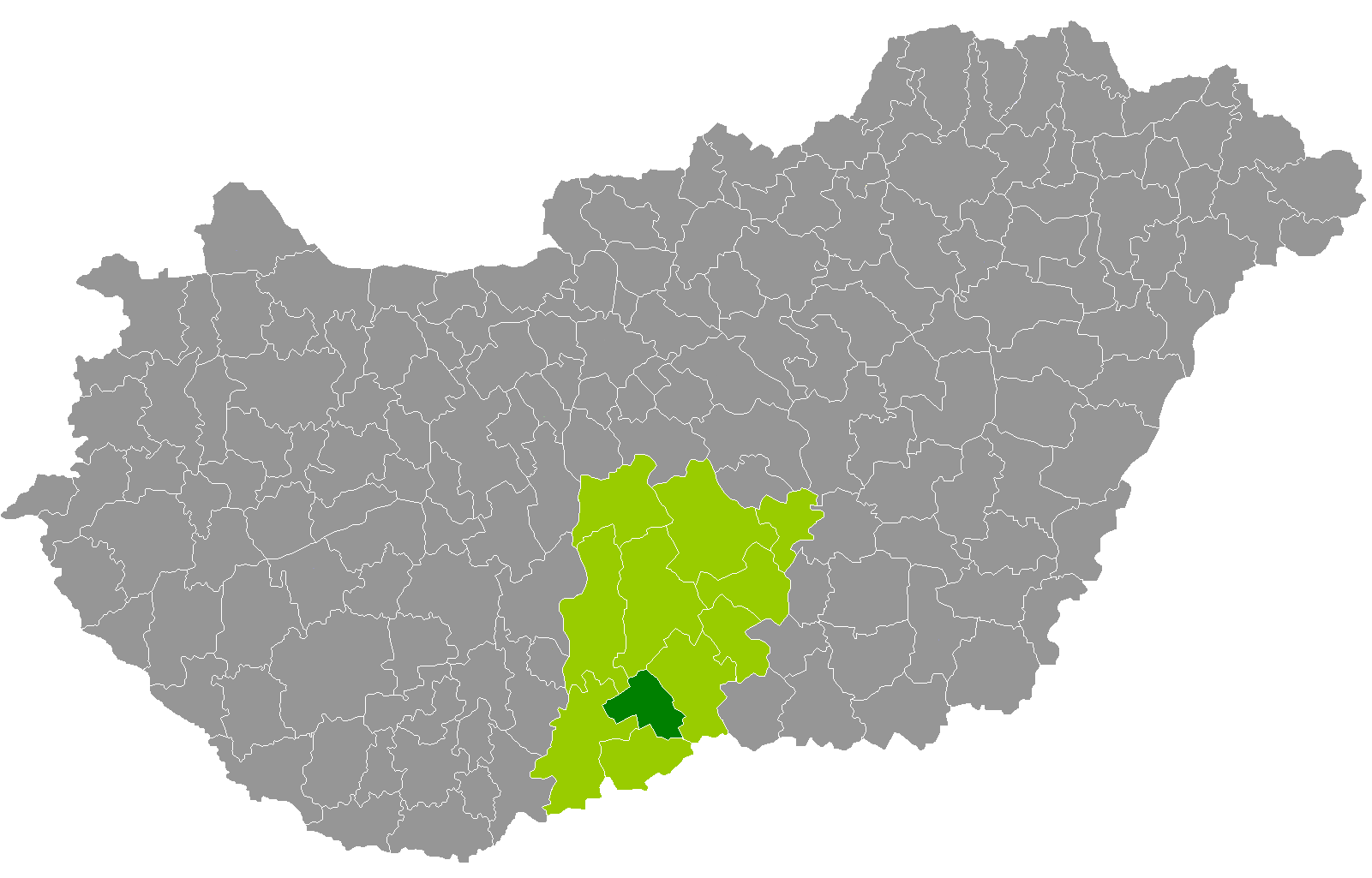
- Jánoshalma District within Hungary and Bács-Kiskun County.
- Country: Hungary
- County: Bács-Kiskun
- District seat: Jánoshalma

Area
  - Total: 439.03 km^{2} (169.51 sq mi)
  - Rank: 10th in Bács-Kiskun

Population (2011 census)
  - Total: 17,341
  - Rank: 11th in Bács-Kiskun
  - Density: 39/km^{2} (100/sq mi)

Jánoshalma (Hungarian: Jánoshalmai járás) is a district in southern part of Bács-Kiskun County. Jánoshalma is also the name of the town where the district seat is found. The district is located in the Southern Great Plain Statistical Region.

== Geography ==
Jánoshalma District borders with Kiskőrös District to the north, Kiskunhalas District to the north and east, Bácsalmás District to the south, Baja District to the west, Kalocsa District to the northwest. The number of the inhabited places in Jánoshalma District is 5.

== Municipalities ==
The district has 2 towns and 3 villages. (ordered by population, as of 1 January 2013)

- Borota (1,431)
- **Jánoshalma** (8,941) – district seat
- Kéleshalom (453)
- **Mélykút** (5,165)
- Rém (1,306)

The bolded municipalities are cities.

== Demographics ==
Religion in Jánoshalma District (2011 census)
1. Catholic Church (65.6%)
2. Calvinism (1.60%)
3. Lutheranism (0.20%)
4. Other religions (1.40%)
5. Non-religious (8.20%)
6. Atheists (0.50%)
7. Undeclared (22.5%)

In 2011, it had a population of 17,341 and the population density was 39/km^{2}.

Year	County population	Change
2011	17,341	n/a

=== Ethnicity ===
Besides the Hungarian majority, the main minorities are the Roma (approx. 800) and German (150).

Total population (2011 census): 17,341
Ethnic groups (2011 census): Identified themselves: 16,200 persons:

- Hungarians: 15,160 (93.58%)
- Gypsies: 767 (4.73%)
- Others and indefinable: 273 (1.69%)

Approx. 1,000 persons in Jánoshalma District did not declare their ethnic group at the 2011 census.

=== Religion ===
Religious adherence in the county according to 2011 census:

- Catholic – 11,378 (Roman Catholic – 11,360; Greek Catholic – 15);
- Reformed – 273;
- Evangelical – 42;
- other religions – 247;
- Non-religious – 1,414;
- Atheism – 80;
- Undeclared – 3,907.

== Gallery ==
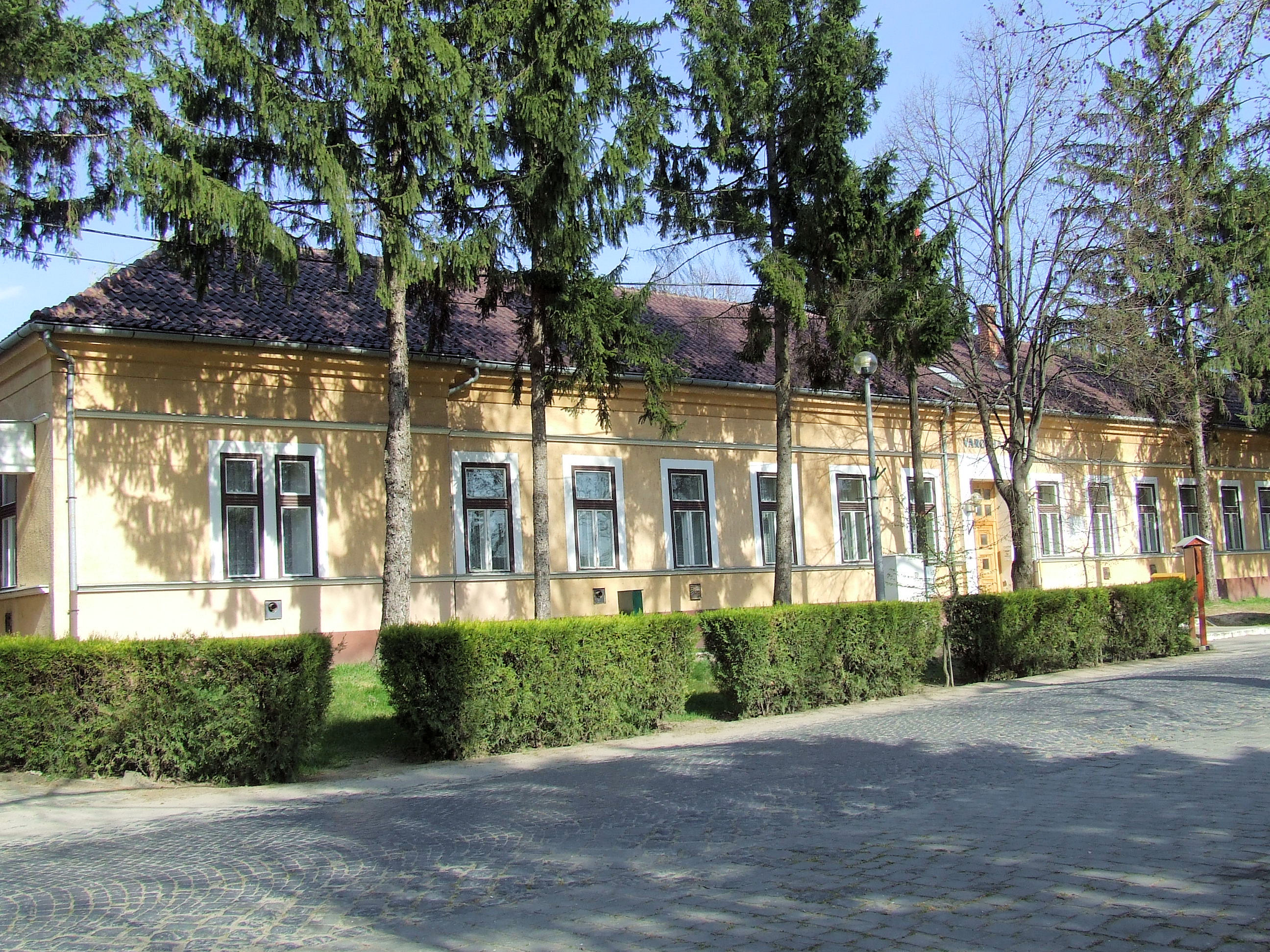
Jánoshalma, Town Hall

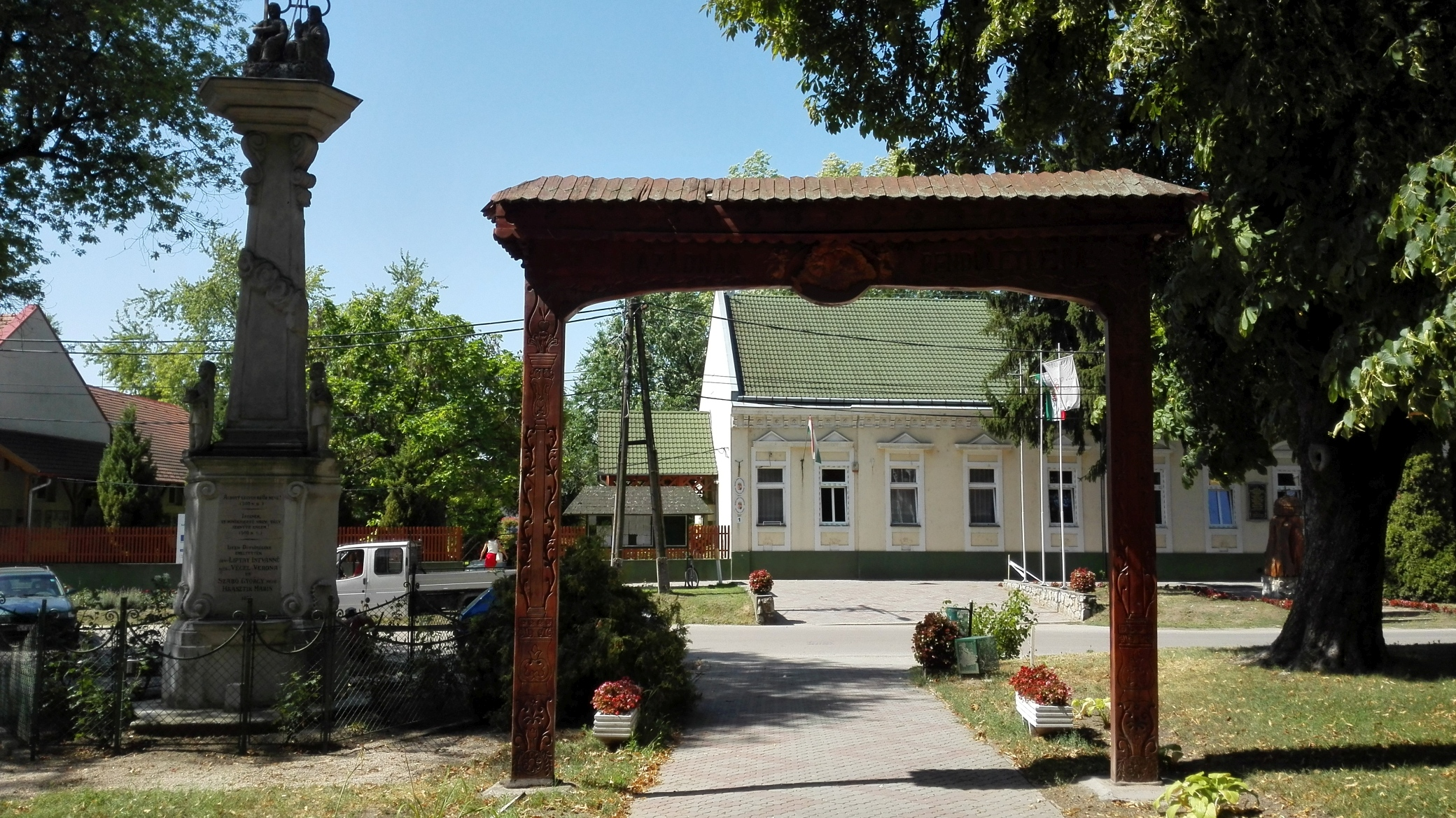
Park in Mélykút

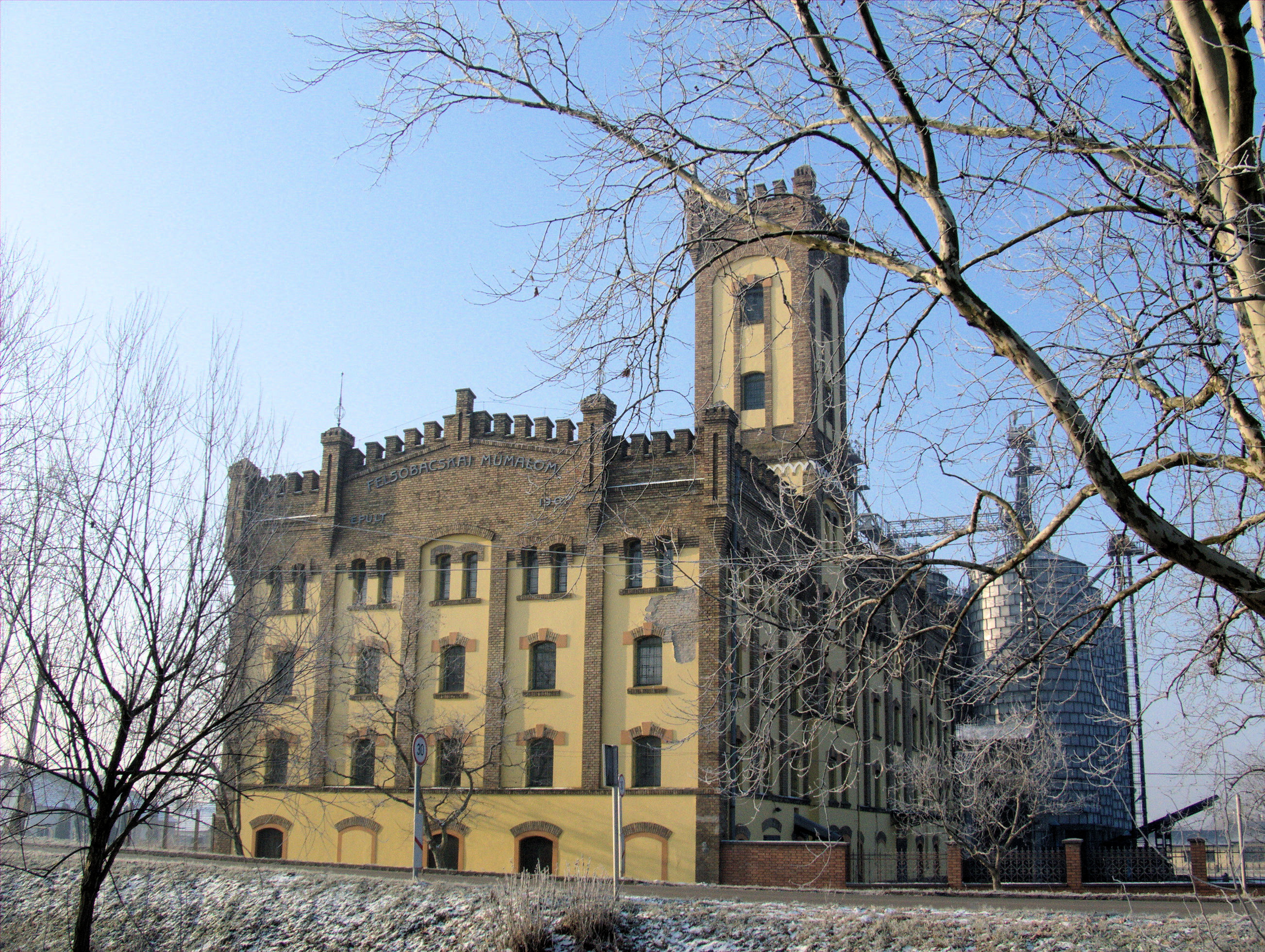
Historic Mill of Upper Bácska (Jánoshalma)

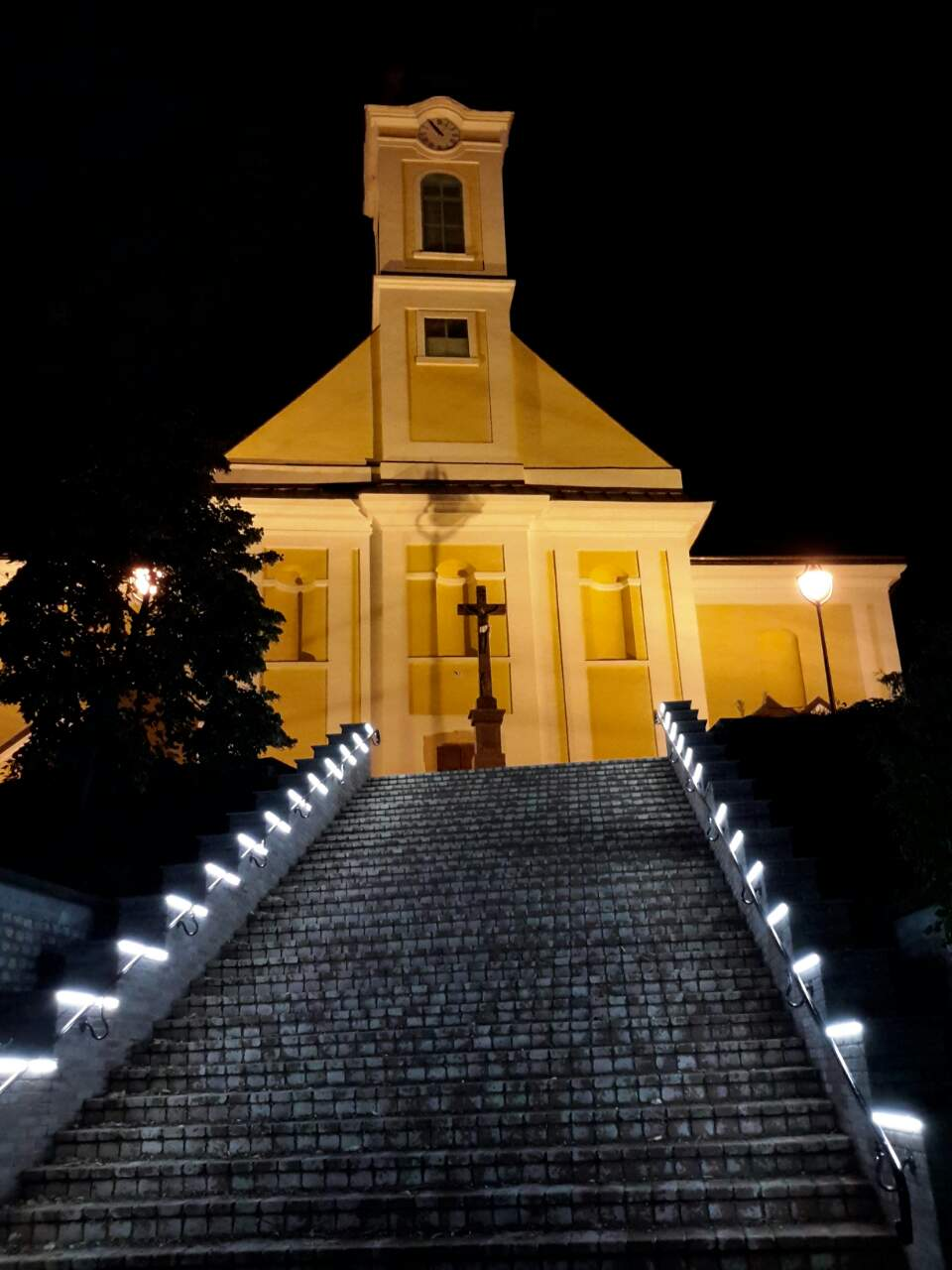
St. Joachim Church in Mélykút

== See also ==
- List of cities and towns of Hungary
