= Bács-Kiskun County =

County of Hungary

Bács-Kiskun County Bács-Kiskun megye
- County
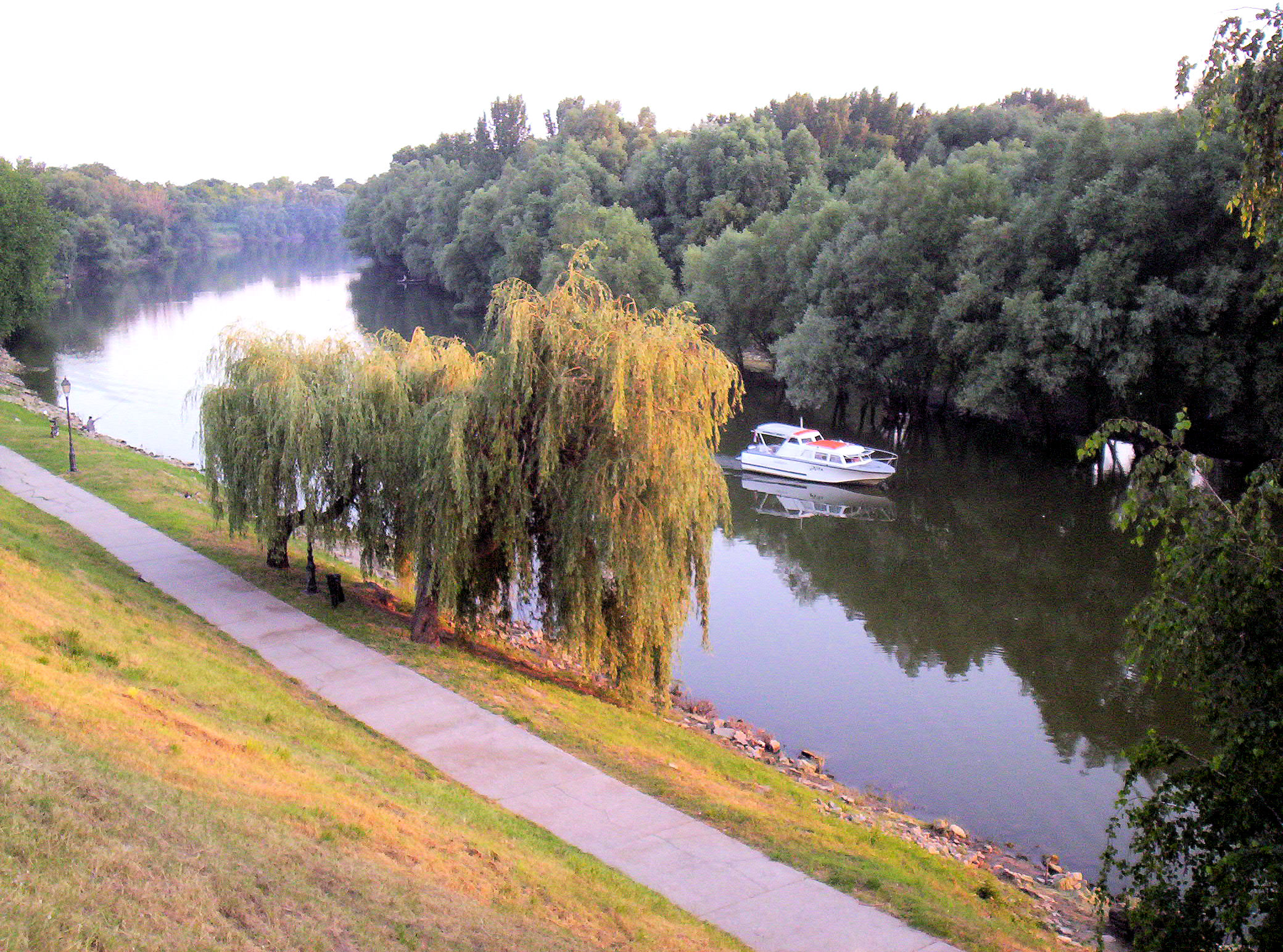
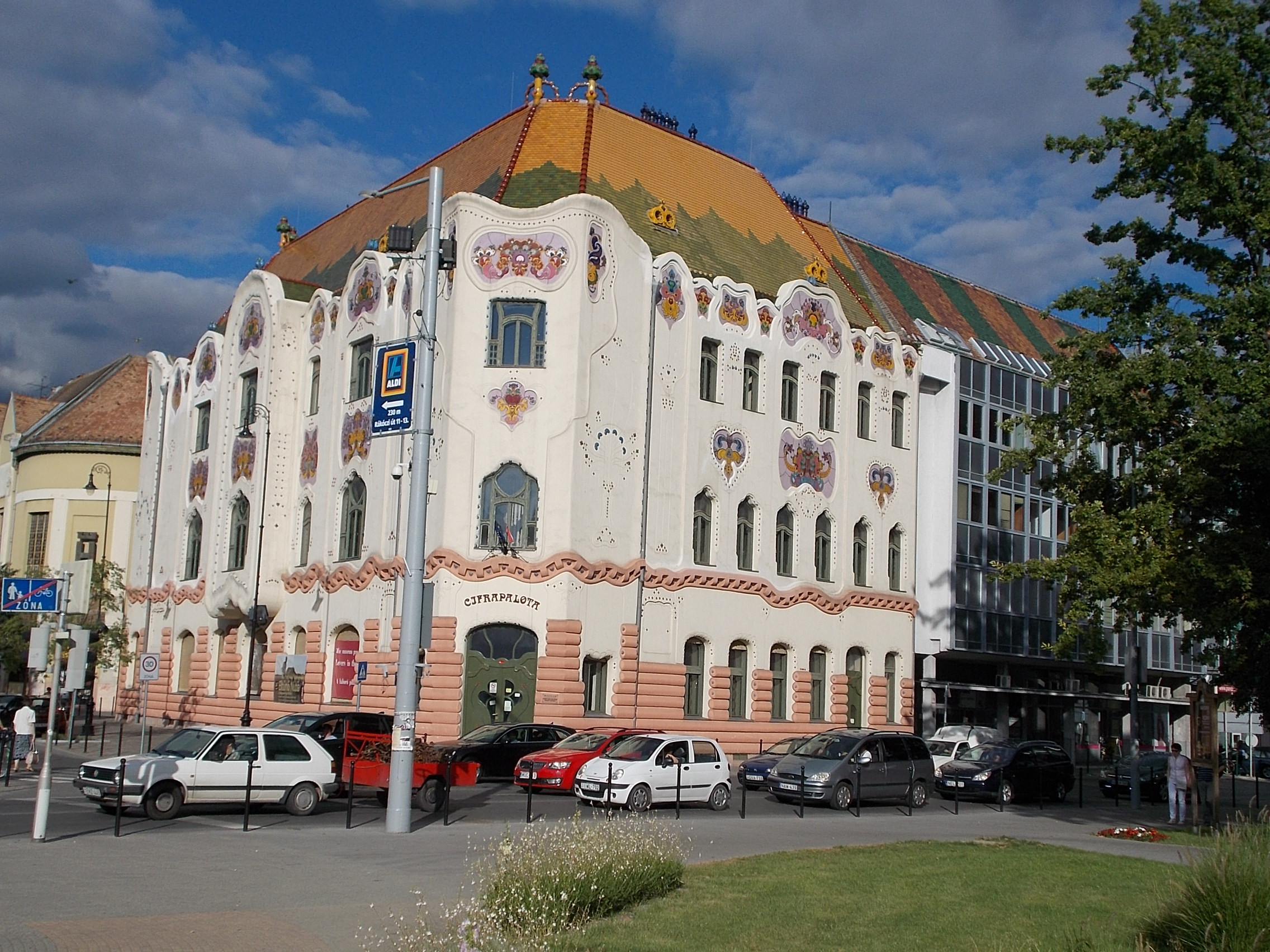
- Sugovica river near Baja, and Cifra Palace in Kecskemét

- Flag Coat of arms

- Bács-Kiskun County within Hungary
- Country: Hungary
- Region: Southern Great Plain
- County seat: Kecskemét
- Districts: 11 districts: Bácsalmás District; Baja District; Jánoshalma District; Kalocsa District; Kecskemét District; Kiskőrös District; Kiskunfélegyháza District; Kiskunhalas District; Kiskunmajsa District; Kunszentmiklós District; Tiszakécske District

Government
  - President of the General Assembly: László Rideg (Fidesz-KDNP)

Area
  - Total: 8,444.81 km^{2} (3,260.56 sq mi)
  - Rank: 1st in Hungary

Population (2018)
  - Total: 505,602
  - Rank: 5th in Hungary
  - Density: 59.8713/km^{2} (155.066/sq mi)

GDP
  - Total: HUF 1,400 billion €4.497 billion (2016)
- Postal code: 60xx – 65xx
- Area code(s): (+36) 76, 77, 78, 79
- ISO 3166 code: HU-BK
- Website: www.bacskiskun.hu

Bács-Kiskun (Hungarian: Bács-Kiskun megye, pronounced [ˈbaːt͡ʃ ˈkiʃkun]; Croatian and Serbian: Bačko-kiškunska županija; German: Komitat Bács-Kiskun) is a county (megye in Hungarian) located in southern Hungary. It was created by the merger of the pre-World War II Bács-Bodrog and the southern parts of Pest-Pilis-Solt-Kiskun counties. With an area of 8,445 km^{2} (3,261 sq mi), Bács-Kiskun is the largest county in the country, slightly larger than Cyprus. The terrain is mostly flat with slight emergences around Baja. The county seat and largest city of Bács-Kiskun is Kecskemét. The county is also part of the Danube-Kris-Mures-Tisa euroregion.

== Geography ==
The county is known across Europe for its natural environment. Kiskunság National Park is located in the area.

=== Location ===
Bács-Kiskun borders Baranya, Tolna, and Fejér on the west (across the Danube River); Pest to the north, Jász-Nagykun-Szolnok and Csongrád on the east, across the Tisza River. To the south Bács-Kiskun shares the international border with Serbia.

Bács-Kiskun lies on the Great Hungarian Plain. The difference between its highest and lowest elevations is only 80 m.

=== Rivers ===
- Danube
- Tisza

=== Lakes ===
- Lake Szelid
- Lake Vadkert

== Symbols ==
=== Coat of arms and flag ===
Coat of arms of Bács-Kiskun County is a modern creation based on older arms. The escutcheon is standing and shredded shield. The shield has a foam skirt with silver and blue shield. The arched upper edge of the shield has a three-barrel, oval-shaped, closed-door, golden wall clock.

- On the left field is a figure of St. Paul the Apostle, barefooted, bearded and long-haired, a silver sword with a silver pommel in his right hand, bearing a book on his left, on a blue background; meant to signify the coat of arms of the former Bács, then Bács-Bodrog County.
- The right coat of arms shows a laughing knight gallant with holding a drawn sword, wearing a gold boots, wearing a red boots and a red glove, holding silver sword in his right, resting his left hand on his hip; meant to signify the former Pest-Pilis-Solt-Kiskun County.
- The alternating silver-blue waves refer to the location of the county between two rivers (Danube and Tisza).

The flag is vertically divided into two equal sections (blue and white), with the coat of arms on it. Its ratio is 2:1. The use of both coat of arms and flag is regulated by the county council.

== History ==
Bács-Kiskun county was created from the pre-1938 counties Bács-Bodrog and Pest-Pilis-Solt-Kiskun. The county came into existence by the unification of some areas of Pest-Pilis-Solt-Kiskun (southern half) and Bács-Bodrog county after World War II. The name Bács derives from the city of the same name, Bač in modern Serbia (known as Bács in Hungarian), while Kiskun is the Hungarian name for the region of Little Cumania.

== Demographics ==
In 2015, it had a population of 513,687 and the population density was 61/km^{2}.

Although the population is decreasing, the birth rate in the county is positive, unlike in any other regions in Hungary.

Historical population

Year	Pop.	±%
1870	324,625	—
1880	346,863	+6.9%
1890	393,205	+13.4%
1900	435,363	+10.7%
1910	485,919	+11.6%
1920	500,638	+3.0%

Year	Pop.	±%
1930	544,201	+8.7%
1941	575,215	+5.7%
1949	591,482	+2.8%
1960	589,744	−0.3%
1970	570,064	−3.3%
1980	571,448	+0.2%

Year	Pop.	±%
1990	546,898	−4.3%
2001	546,517	−0.1%
2011	520,331	−4.8%
2022	495,318	−4.8%

Source: Censuses

=== Ethnicity ===
Religion in Bács-Kiskun County (2022 census – of those who declared their religion (59.8%)
1. Roman Catholic (58.0%)
2. Greek Catholic (0.50%)
3. Calvinistic (12.3%)
4. Lutheran (3.50%)
5. Other Christian denomination (5.00%)
6. Other religion (0.40%)
7. Not religious (20.3%)

The population of the county is almost homogeneous, with a Hungarian majority (94.1%). Some Croatian, German and Serbian people live around Hajós and Baja.

Total population (2011 census): 520,331
Ethnic groups (2011 census): Identified themselves: 475 004 persons:

- Hungarians: 445 978 (93,89%)
- Gypsies: 10 918 (2,30%)
- Germans: 9 528 (2,01%)
- Others and indefinable: 8 570 (1,80%)

Approx. 67,000 persons in Bács-Kiskun County did not declare their ethnic group at the 2011 census.

=== Religion ===
Religious adherence in the county according to 2011 census:

- Catholic – 259,822 (Roman Catholic – 258,758; Greek Catholic – 998);
- Reformed – 45,933;
- Evangelical – 13,288;
- Orthodox – 387;
- other religions – 9,279;
- Non-religious – 62,391;
- Atheism – 4,436;
- Undeclared – 124,795.

== Economy ==
Bács-Kiskun county accounted for 3.7% of the Gross Value Added of Hungary in 2001. With almost EUR 1.9 billion, the GVA in Bács-Kiskun had increased by 50% compared to 1995.

=== Sectors ===
The primary sector accounted for 12.3% of the Gross Value Added of the county in 2001, and this was the highest share of any county. However, this share is declining over the years: it was 15.6% in 1995.

The share of the secondary sector is relatively constant over the years, with 30.9% of the Gross Value Added in 2001 (compared to 29.5% in 1995). The tertiary sector's GVA has increased most, although it still had a low share (56.8%) compared to the country as a whole (64.4%).

=== Service and trade ===
Service and trade are the dominant sectors of Bács-Kiskun's economy, where privatisation occurred first.

80% of the industrial output is represented by the food, machine, wood, and printing industries. The more substantial companies in the region attracted more investment. In the course of privatisation the Kecskemét cannery was purchased by Heinz, the Kiskunhalas textile mill partially by Levi's. During the privatisation, the Danube Knitting Mill in Baja was acquired by an American financial investment group

Among the industrial companies operating in the area of Baja are UNILEVER Rt. producing deep-frozen products, the Bread factory of Bácska Sütoipari Rt., the abattoir of DÉLHÚS and the Pannonia Brewery. The local government of Baja are encouraging the expansion of foreign capital by reducing local taxes.

There are approximately 39,600 firms in the county, representing 4.6% of the national total. The majority of companies employ only several people; indeed, 95% have 10 or fewer employees. Two percent of companies belong in the medium category, employing between 21 and 50 people, while the number and proportion of those employing 300 or more is very small.

=== Agriculture ===
Fruit, vegetable, corn and wheat production are the most successful branches of the region's agriculture. Compared to the other Hungarian counties, Bács-Kiskun has the second largest number of pigs (10% of the Hungarian pig stock) and 7% of cattle stock. The stock of sheep made up 194,000 at the end of 2002, 17.6% of Hungary's total stock and the largest in Hungary.

== Transport ==
=== Road ===
On account of its central location, a great deal of the nation's traffic necessarily crosses the county. The total length of main roads in the county was 2,213 kilometres in 2002 so for every 100 square kilometres of land area, there are 26 kilometres of main road. Despite the fact that a great deal of labour has gone into improving the quality of the roads in the last decade, there has been a deterioration in their condition on account of their intensive use. Fifty-six kilometres of motorways crossed the county in 2002, making the road link with Serbia and the Balkans.

Highway M5 and Road 5 go through Bács-Kiskun. There are many second-class roads throughout the county, giving easy access to every village. The international railroad lines Budapest-Subotica-Belgrade and the national railroad Budapest-Cegléd-Szeged pass through Bács-Kiskun as well.

=== Rail ===
The length of railways was of 641 kilometres in 2001 (32% electrified) and the most important lines in the county are between Budapest and Szeged and the route of the international express trains crossing Hungary in northwestern-southeastern direction leading to Belgrade. In addition to the main and secondary lines, there are a number of narrow gauge tracks for 'nostalgia trains' which operate as tourist attractions.

Baja is the most important traffic junction of the southern part of the country. Its rail and public road junction is especially important due to the presence of the Danube bridge which provides a link between the Southern Great Plain and the Transdanubian region. The city has the best-equipped port in the country, where further development possibilities await the investors. At present a 120 places ro-ro port terminal is under construction.

=== Air ===
The only airport in the county, in Kecskemét, is a military one, chiefly used for the delivery of goods and occasionally for receiving civil aircraft. However, the county can be reached from the nearby Ferihegy Airport of Budapest in less than an hour.

== Politics ==
=== County Assembly ===
The county is governed by the County board of supervisors, which is located in the county seat.

The Bács-Kiskun County Council, elected at the 2024 local government elections, is made up of 23 counselors, with the following party composition:

Party	Seats	Current County Assembly
Fidesz-KDNP	14	
Our Homeland Movement	5	
Democratic Coalition	2	
Momentum Movement	2	

==== President of the County Assembly ====
President	Terminus
Mihály Kőtörő (SZDSZ)	1990–1994
László Balogh (MSZP)	1994–1998
Endre Sándor (Fidesz)	1998–2002
László Balogh (MSZP)	2002–2006
Gábor Bányai (Fidesz-KDNP)	2006–2014
László Rideg (Fidesz-KDNP)	2014–

=== Members of the National Assembly ===
The following members elected of the National Assembly during the 2022 parliamentary election:

Constituency	Member	Party
Bács-Kiskun County 1st constituency	László Salacz	Fidesz–KDNP
Bács-Kiskun County 2nd constituency	Gyula Szeberényi	Fidesz–KDNP
Bács-Kiskun County 3rd constituency	Sándor Font	Fidesz–KDNP
Bács-Kiskun County 4th constituency	Sándor Lezsák	Fidesz–KDNP
Bács-Kiskun County 5th constituency	Gábor Bányai	Fidesz–KDNP
Bács-Kiskun County 6th constituency	Róbert Zsigó	Fidesz–KDNP

== Regional structure ==
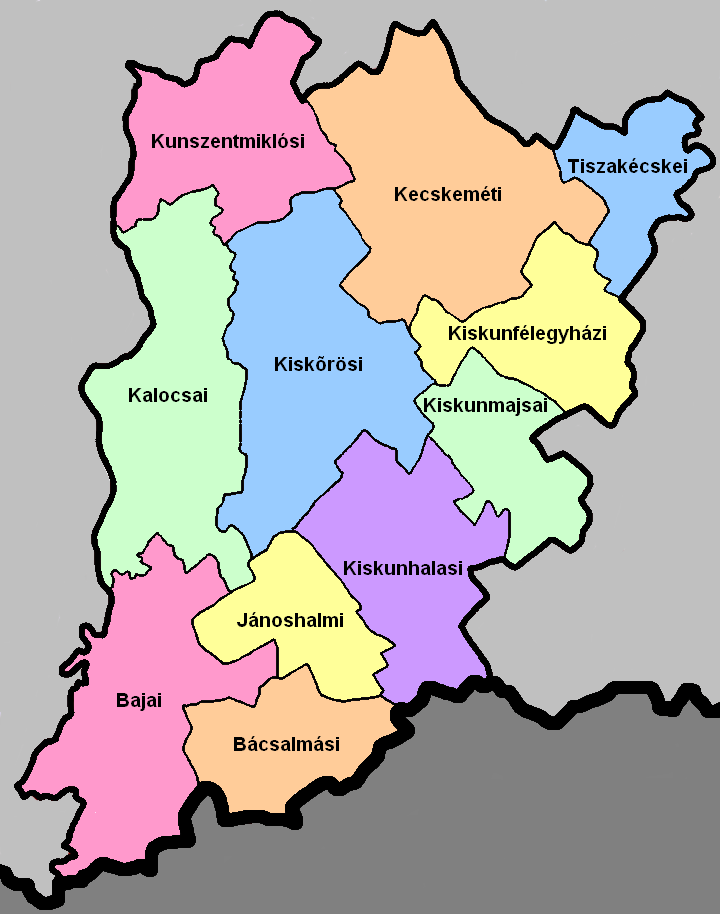
District of Bács-Kiskun County

No.	English and Hungarian names	Area (km^{2})	Population (2011)	Density (pop./km^{2})	Seat	No. of municipalities
1	Bácsalmás District; Bácsalmási járás	522.54	20,094	38	Bácsalmás	10
2	Baja District; Bajai járás	1,008.80	66,501	66	Baja	17
3	Jánoshalma District; Jánoshalmai járás	439.03	17,341	39	Jánoshalma	5
4	Kalocsa District; Kalocsai járás	1,062.27	52,479	49	Kalocsa	21
5	Kecskemét District; Kecskeméti járás	1,212.21	155,481	128	Kecskemét	16
6	Kiskőrös District; Kiskőrösi járás	1,130.33	54,625	48	Kiskőrös	15
7	Kiskunfélegyháza District; Kiskunfélegyházi járás	582.37	37,455	64	Kiskunfélegyháza	6
8	Kiskunhalas District; Kiskunhalasi járás	826.35	43,849	53	Kiskunhalas	9
9	Kiskunmajsa District; Kiskunmajsai járás	485.13	18,908	39	Kiskunmajsa	6
10	Kunszentmiklós District; Kunszentmiklósi járás	769.81	29,998	39	Kunszentmiklós	9
11	Tiszakécske District; Tiszakécskei járás	405.99	23,582	58	Tiszakécske	5
Bács-Kiskun County		8,444.81	520,331	62	Kecskemét	119

=== Municipalities ===
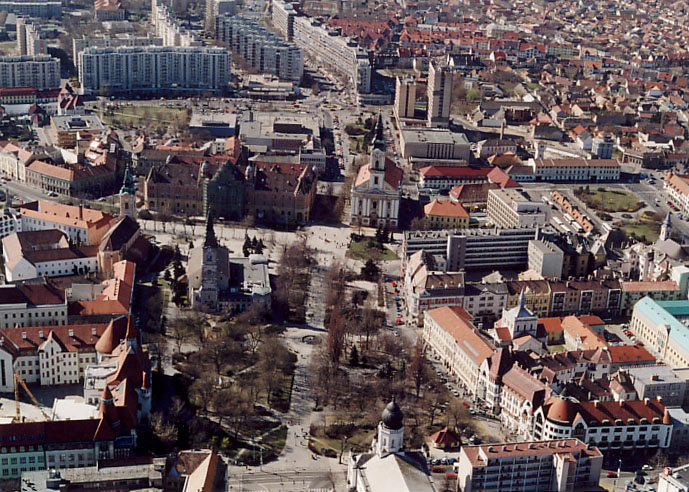
Aerial photography: Kecskemét – Hungary

Bács-Kiskun County has 1 urban county, 21 towns, 7 large villages and 90 villages.

Two-thirds of the population lives in the 20 cities/towns, among which the largest is the county seat, Kecskemét, where one-sixth of the total population resides. The town with the largest population density is Kalocsa (353/km^{2}), the lowest population density is in the village of Újsolt (6/km^{2}). City/towns have an average population density of 126/km^{2}, while villages have an average of 36/km^{2}.

Even though Bács-Kiskun is the fifth largest county of Hungary by population, the population density is less than half of the country's average. The villages are typically large. 13% of the population lives on farms and homesteads.

City with county rights

(ordered by population, as of 2011 census)

- Kecskemét (111,411) – county seat

Towns

- Baja (36,267)
- Kiskunfélegyháza (30,172)
- Kiskunhalas (28,285)
- Kalocsa (17,142)
- Kiskőrös (14,236)
- Kiskunmajsa (11,229)
- Tiszakécske (11,430)
- Lajosmizse (11,050)
- Jánoshalma (9,008)
- Kecel (8,711)
- Kunszentmiklós (8,561)
- Soltvadkert (7,309)
- Solt (7,019)
- Bácsalmás (6,753)
- Kerekegyháza (6,284)
- Szabadszállás (6,093)
- Izsák (5,650)
- Mélykút (5,200)
- Tompa (4,267)
- Dunavecse (3,881)
- Hajós (3,104)

Villages

- Akasztó
- Ágasegyháza
- Apostag
- Ballószög
- Balotaszállás
- Bácsbokod
- Bácsborsód
- Bácsszentgyörgy
- Bácsszőlős
- Bátmonostor
- Bátya
- Borota
- Bócsa
- Bugac
- Bugacpusztaháza
- Császártöltés
- Csátalja
- Csávoly
- Csengőd
- Csikéria
- Csólyospálos
- Dávod
- Drágszél
- Dunaegyháza
- Dunafalva
- Dunapataj
- Dunaszentbenedek
- Dunatetétlen
- Dusnok
- Érsekcsanád
- Érsekhalma
- Fajsz
- Felsőlajos
- Felsőszentiván
- Foktő
- Fülöpháza
- Fülöpjakab
- Fülöpszállás
- Gara
- Gátér
- Géderlak
- Harkakötöny
- Harta
- Helvécia
- Hercegszántó
- Homokmégy
- Imrehegy
- Jakabszállás
- Jászszentlászló
- Kaskantyú
- Katymár
- Kelebia
- Kéleshalom
- Kisszállás
- Kömpöc
- Kunadacs
- Kunbaja
- Kunbaracs
- Kunfehértó
- Kunpeszér
- Kunszállás
- Ladánybene
- Lakitelek
- Madaras
- Mátételke
- Miske
- Móricgát
- Nagybaracska
- Nemesnádudvar
- Nyárlőrinc
- Ordas
- Orgovány
- Öregcsertő
- Páhi
- Pálmonostora
- Petőfiszállás
- Pirtó
- Rém
- Soltszentimre
- Sükösd
- Szakmár
- Szalkszentmárton
- Szank
- Szentkirály
- Szeremle
- Tabdi
- Tass
- Tataháza
- Tázlár
- Tiszaalpár
- Tiszaug
- Uszód
- Újsolt
- Újtelek
- Vaskút
- Városföld
- Zsana

municipalities are large villages.

There are also public, religion and private schools in Bács- Kiskun county. Primaries are almost in all of the villages and towns. Some of them are quite big, but there are actually small schools with only a few students. One of the oldest schools is the Calvinist Grammar School, which was founded in 1564. Religion schools are important in the county, as well as it is in this way all around in Hungary (in the county: Calvinist Grammar Schools- Kecskemét, Kiskunhalas, "Piarista" Catholic Grammar School, Kecskemét- for boys only-, "Angolkisasszonyok" Catholic Grammar School, Kecskemét- for girls only.). 100 years ago children could only learn in these schools, the first public grammar schools were founded only in the 1950s. Almost all of the religion schools were closed in the 1940s by the communist government, and were refounded only in the 1990s (like all of the Calvinist schools). The main public grammar schools of the county are the Bibó István Grammar School (Kiskunhalas), Bányai Júlia Grammar School (Kecskemét), Katona József Grammar School (Kecskemét) and III. Béla Grammar School (Baja). There are many competitions to the children in almost all of the subjects (mainly in Hungarian, English, German and Mathematics). There's only one University in Kecskemét, the Károli Gáspár Calvinist University of Law (it used to be the Calvinist Grammar School from 1991 to 1997). The College of Kecskemét have several fields of study, like Teacher, Gardener, and so on.

== Miscellaneous topics ==
=== List of notable residents ===
- József Bayer, member of Hungarian Academy of Sciences
- Jenő Ernst, doctor, biologist, member of Hungarian Academy of Sciences
- András Gáspár, Hungarian General
- János Hornyik, historian
- Dénes Jánossy, mailing member of Hungarian Academy of Sciences
- András Jelky, a man who travelled around the world in a strange way (1730–1783)
- József Katona, author
- Zoltán Kodály, composer, ethnomusicologist, educator, linguist and philosopher
- Kálmán Latabár, actor, comedian
- Béla Magyari, cosmonaut
- Lázár Mészáros, Hungary's first Minister of War
- Dezső Miskolczy, explorer of mental disease, member of Hungarian Academy of Sciences
- Ferenc Móra, novelist
- Sándor Petőfi, Hungarian national poet
- Emma Sándor, composer, wife of Zoltán Kodály
- Ede Telcs, sculptor
- Kálmán Tóth, poet
- István Türr, Garibaldi's general

== Gallery ==
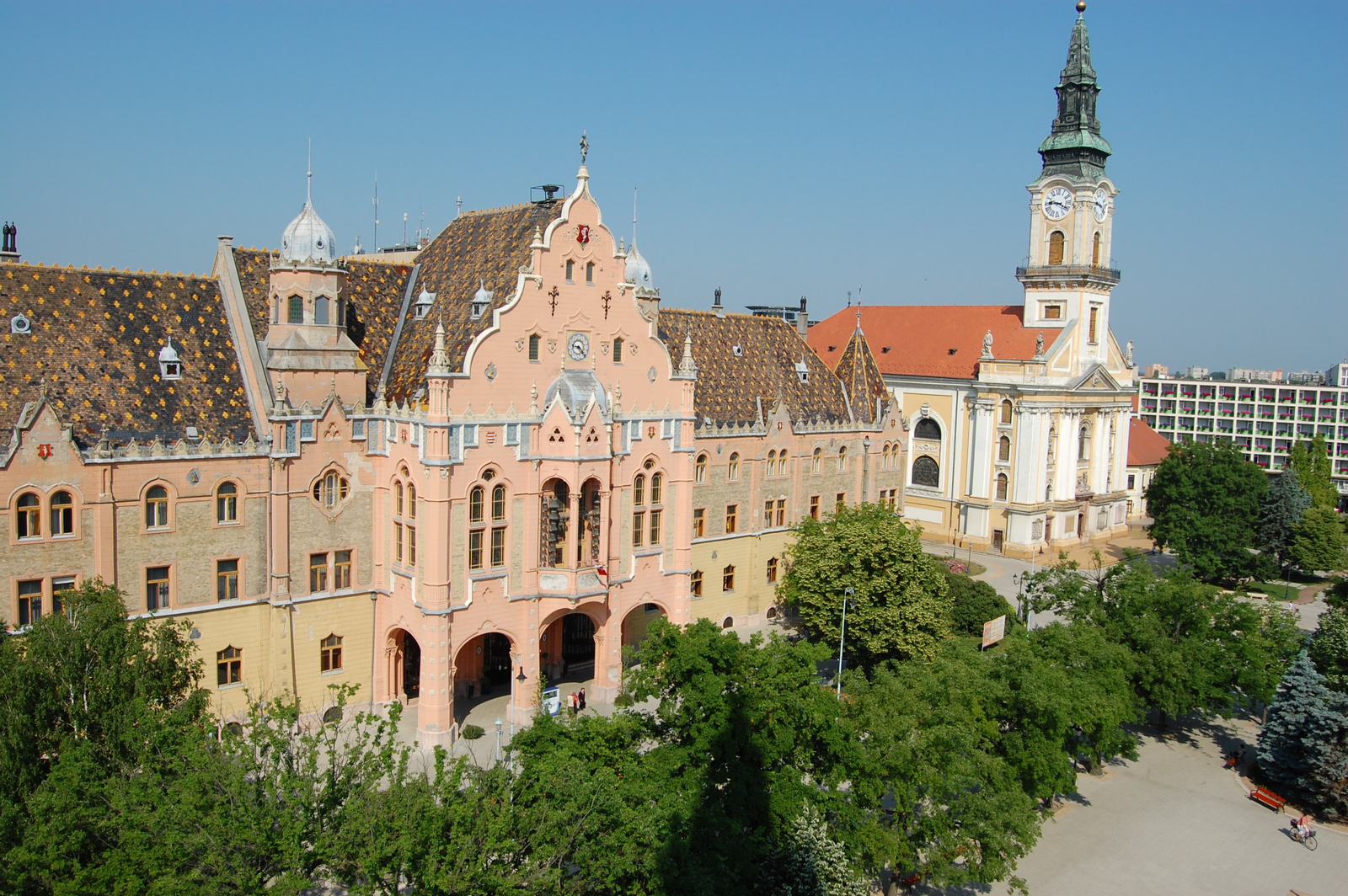
Kecskemét, the capital of the county

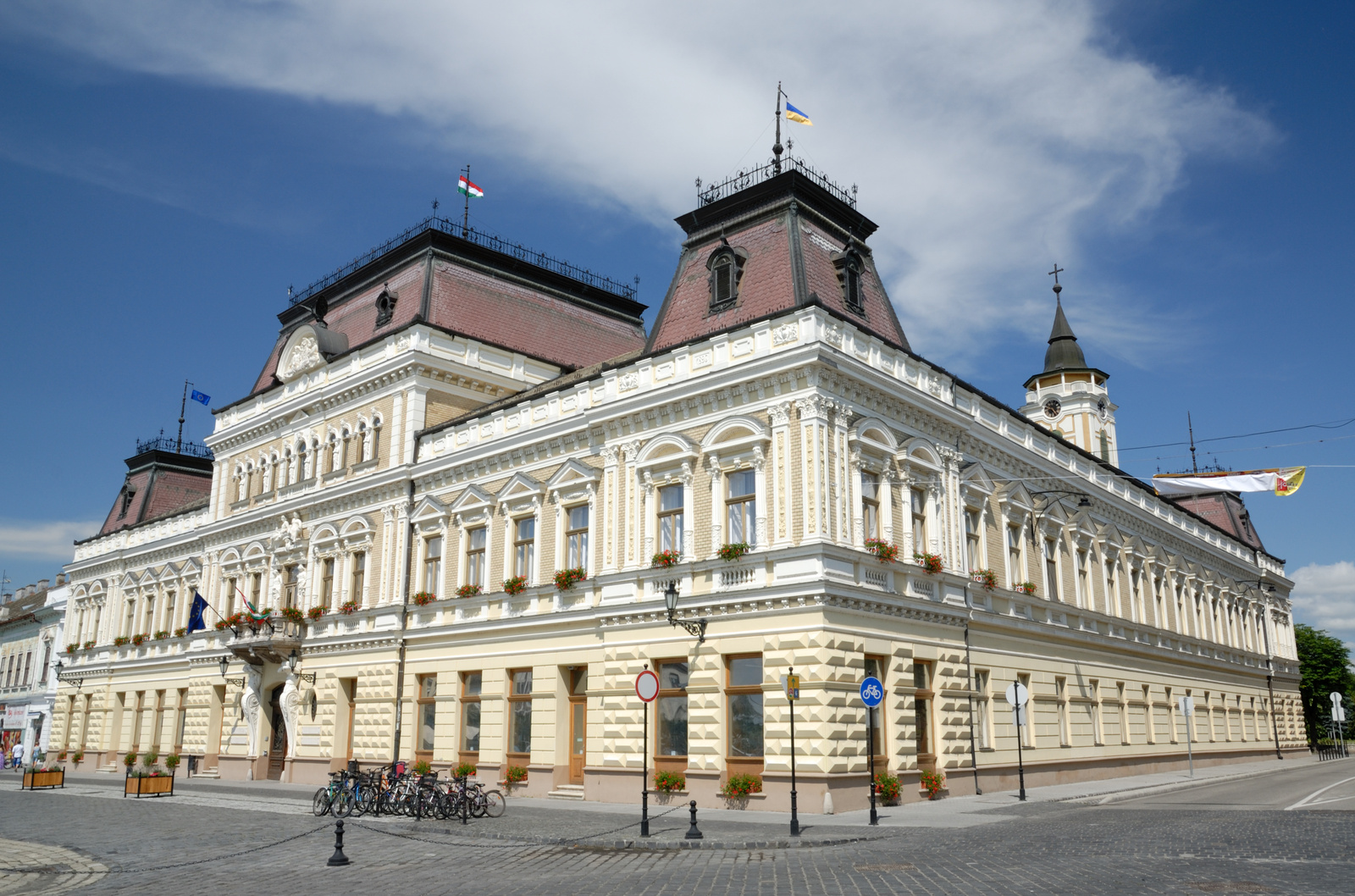
Town hall of Baja

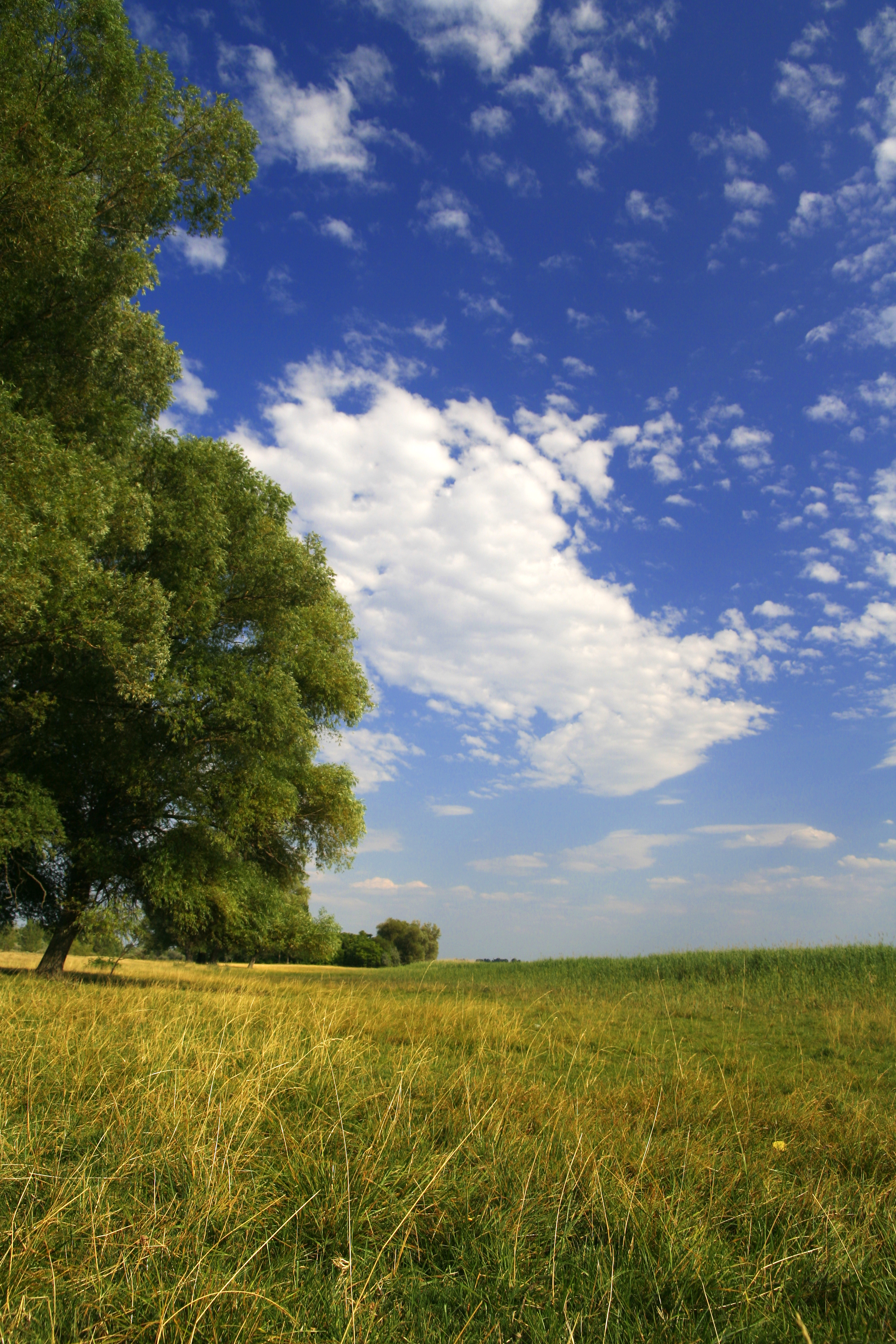
Kiskunság National Park

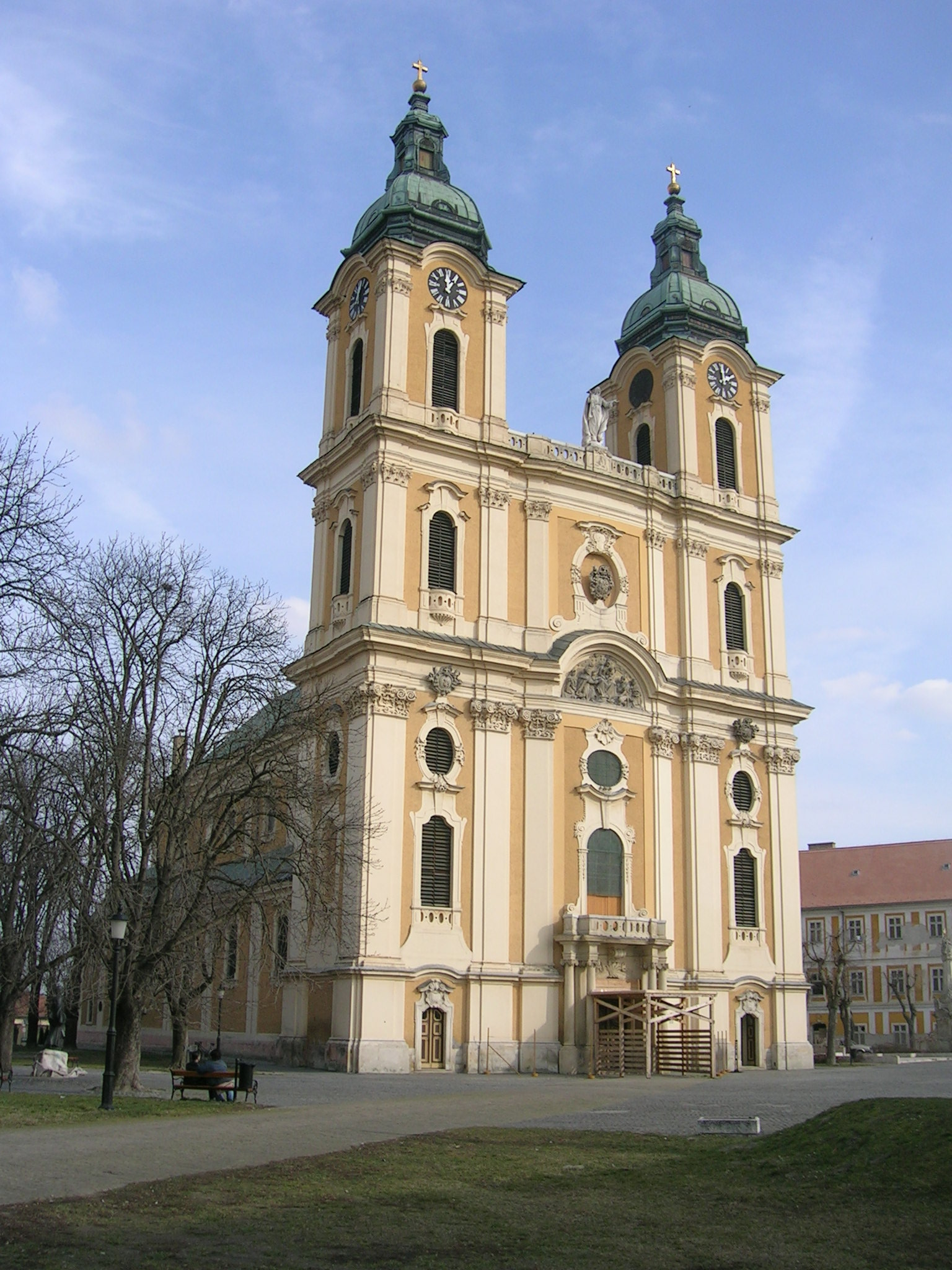
Cathedral in Kalocsa

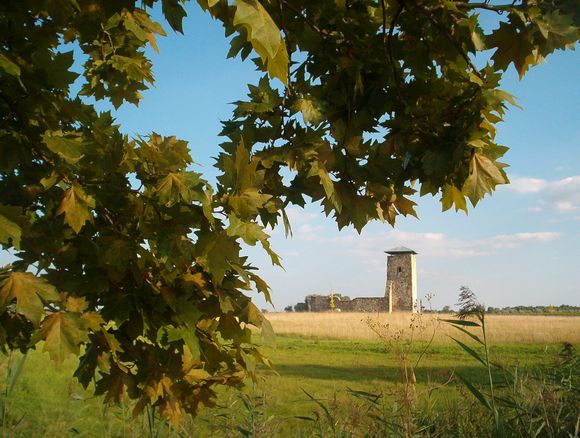
Maimed Tower in Soltszentimre

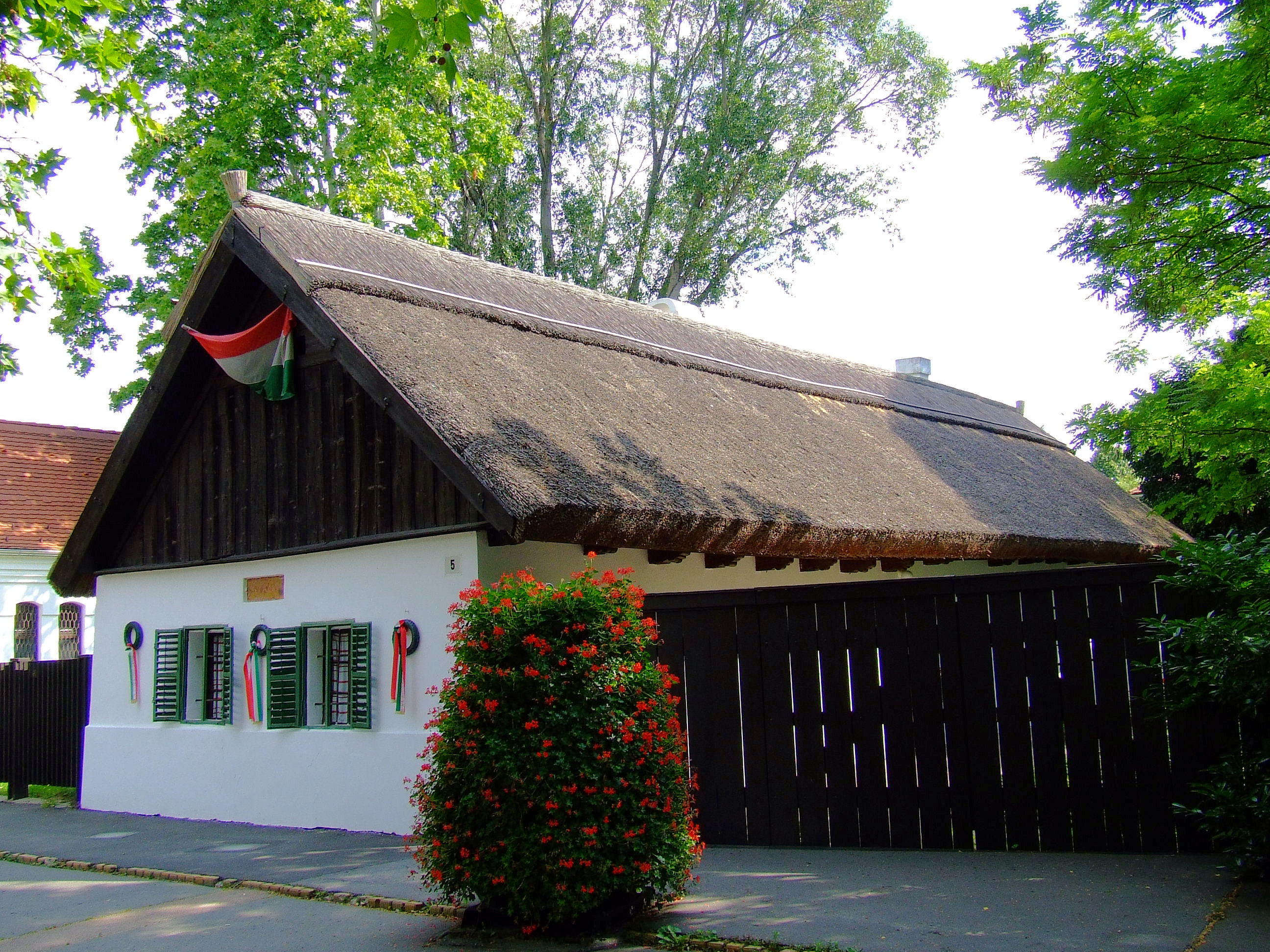
House of Sándor Petőfi in Kiskőrös

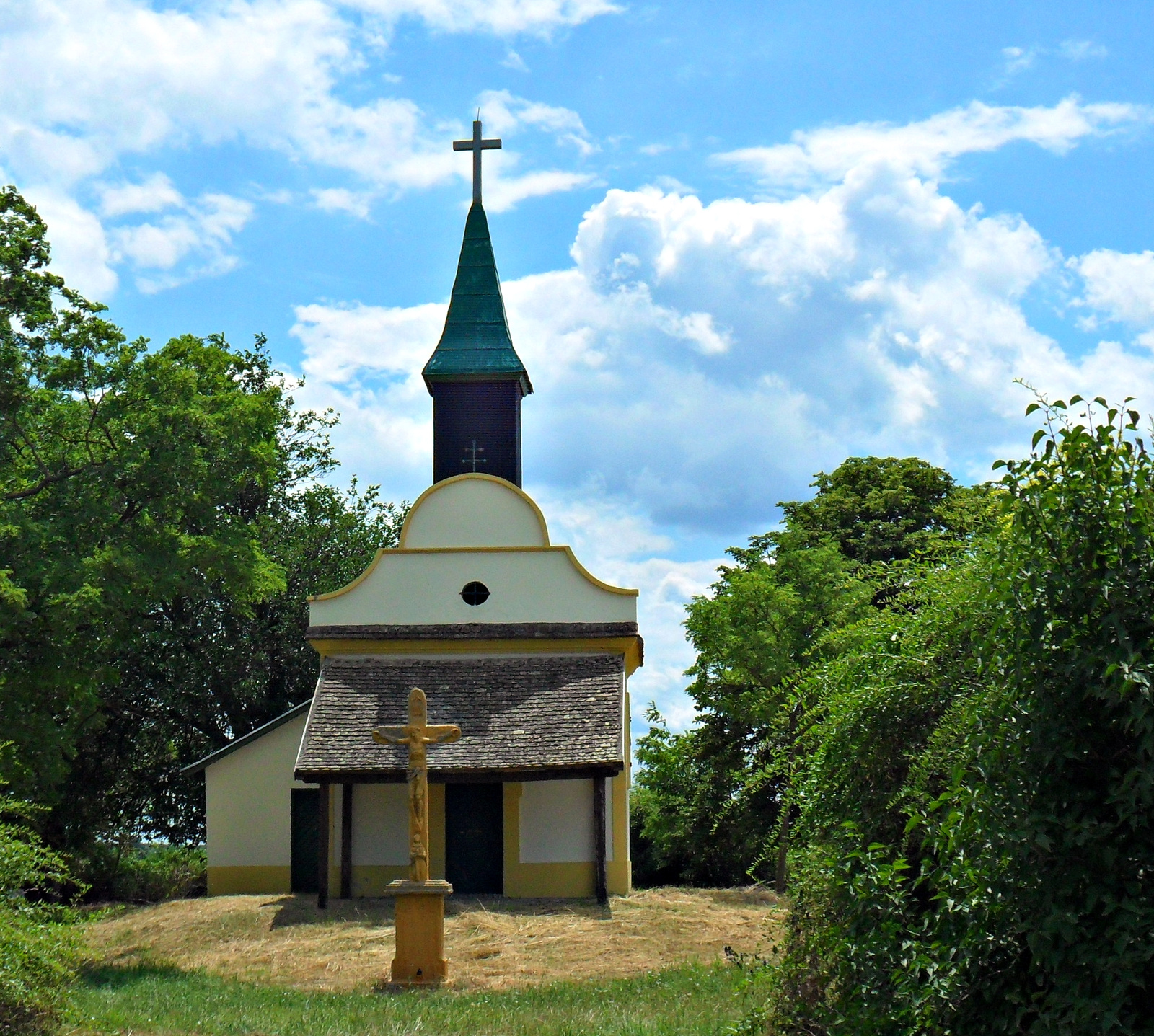
Saint Anne Chapel in Sükösd

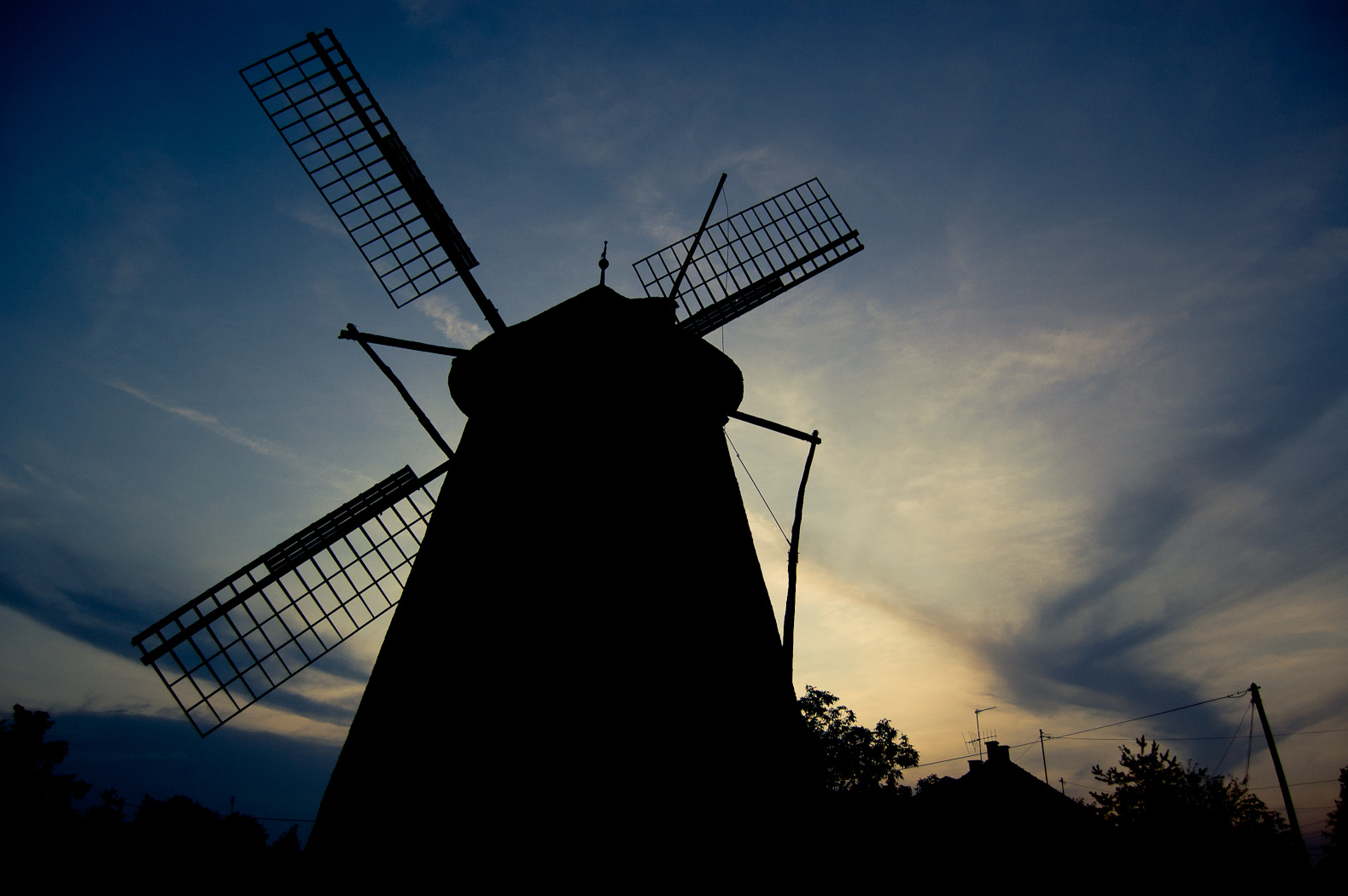
Windmill in Kiskunhalas

== See also ==
- List of Bács-Kiskun-related topics
- List of people from Bács-Kiskun
- Former Bács-Bodrog County of the Kingdom of Hungary
