= Jánoshalma =

- Town
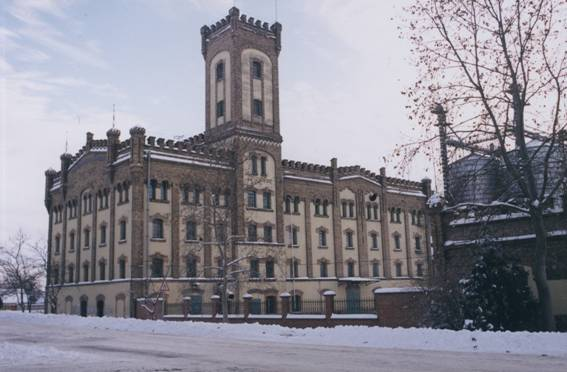

- Flag Coat of arms

- Location of Jánoshalma
- Coordinates: 46.29671°N 19.32283°E
- Country: Hungary
- County: Bács-Kiskun
- District: Jánoshalma

Area
  - Total: 132.21 km^{2} (51.05 sq mi)

Population (2012)
  - Total: 8,937
  - Density: 74.48/km^{2} (192.9/sq mi)
- Time zone: UTC+1 (CET)
  - Summer (DST): UTC+2 (CEST)
- Postal code: 6440
- Area code: (+36) 77
- Website: www.janoshalma.hu

Jánoshalma (Croatian: Jankovac) is a town in Bács-Kiskun county in southern Hungary. The population was 8,937 in 2012.
