= Kunadacs =

Coordinates: 46°57′N 19°19′E

- Interactive map of Kunadacs
- Country: Hungary
- County: Bács-Kiskun

Area
  - Total: 89.9 km^{2} (34.7 sq mi)

Population (2015)
  - Total: 1,537
  - Density: 20/km^{2} (52/sq mi)
- Time zone: UTC+1 (CET)
  - Summer (DST): UTC+2 (CEST)
- Postal code: 6097
- Area code: 76

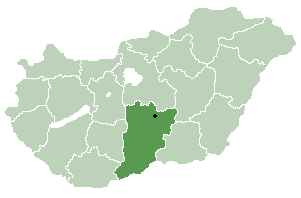
Location of Bács-Kiskun county in Hungary

Kunadacs is a village in Bács-Kiskun county, in the Southern Great Plain region of southern Hungary.

== Geography ==
It covers an area of 89.9 km^{2} (35 sq mi) and has a population of 1537 people (2015).
