= Szentkirály =

Coordinates: 46°55′4″N 19°55′8″E

- Interactive map of Szentkirály
- Country: Hungary
- County: Bács-Kiskun

Area
  - Total: 101.83 km^{2} (39.32 sq mi)

Population (2002)
  - Total: 1,987
  - Density: 20/km^{2} (52/sq mi)
- Time zone: UTC+1 (CET)
  - Summer (DST): UTC+2 (CEST)
- Postal code: 6031
- Area code: 76

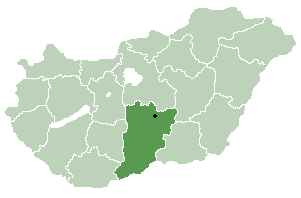
Location of Bács-Kiskun county in Hungary

Szentkirály is a village in Bács-Kiskun county, in the Southern Great Plain region of southern Hungary. The name, literally "Saint King," refers to King (later saint) Stephen I of Hungary.

== Geography ==
It covers an area of 101.83 km^{2} (39 sq mi) and has a population of 1987 people (2002).

== Natural water in Szentkirály ==
High quality natural water in Hungary. The natural water from Szentkirály is a family company which began in 1989 in Szentkirály, Hungary. The company initially began as a soft drink company, but when the exceptional purity of the mineral water was discovered, the company began to sell the mineral water on its own merit.

Szentkirály Ásványvíz Kft. was registered as its own company in 2003.

The company Szentkirály currently manufactures a variety of mineral water products in an assortment of sizes, mineral content, and sparkling/still. Their three basic mineral waters are:

- Still, packaged in pink
- Sparkling, packaged in blue
- Mild, packaged in green
