= Mélykút =

- Town
- Flag Coat of arms

- Location within Hungary
- Coordinates: 46.2139°N 19.3796°E
- Country: Hungary
- County: Bács-Kiskun
- District: Jánoshalma

Area
  - Total: 123.5 km^{2} (47.7 sq mi)

Population (2018)
  - Total: 4,763
  - Density: 38.56/km^{2} (99.9/sq mi)
- Time zone: UTC+1 (CET)
  - Summer (DST): UTC+2 (CEST)
- Postal code: 6449
- Area code: (+36) 77
- Website: www.melykut.hu

Mélykút (Croatian: Miljkut) is a town in Bács-Kiskun county, in the Southern Great Plain region of Hungary in Bacska.

== Geography ==
It covers an area of 123.5 km^{2} (48 sq mi) and had a population of 4,763 in 2018.
