= Madaras =

- Village
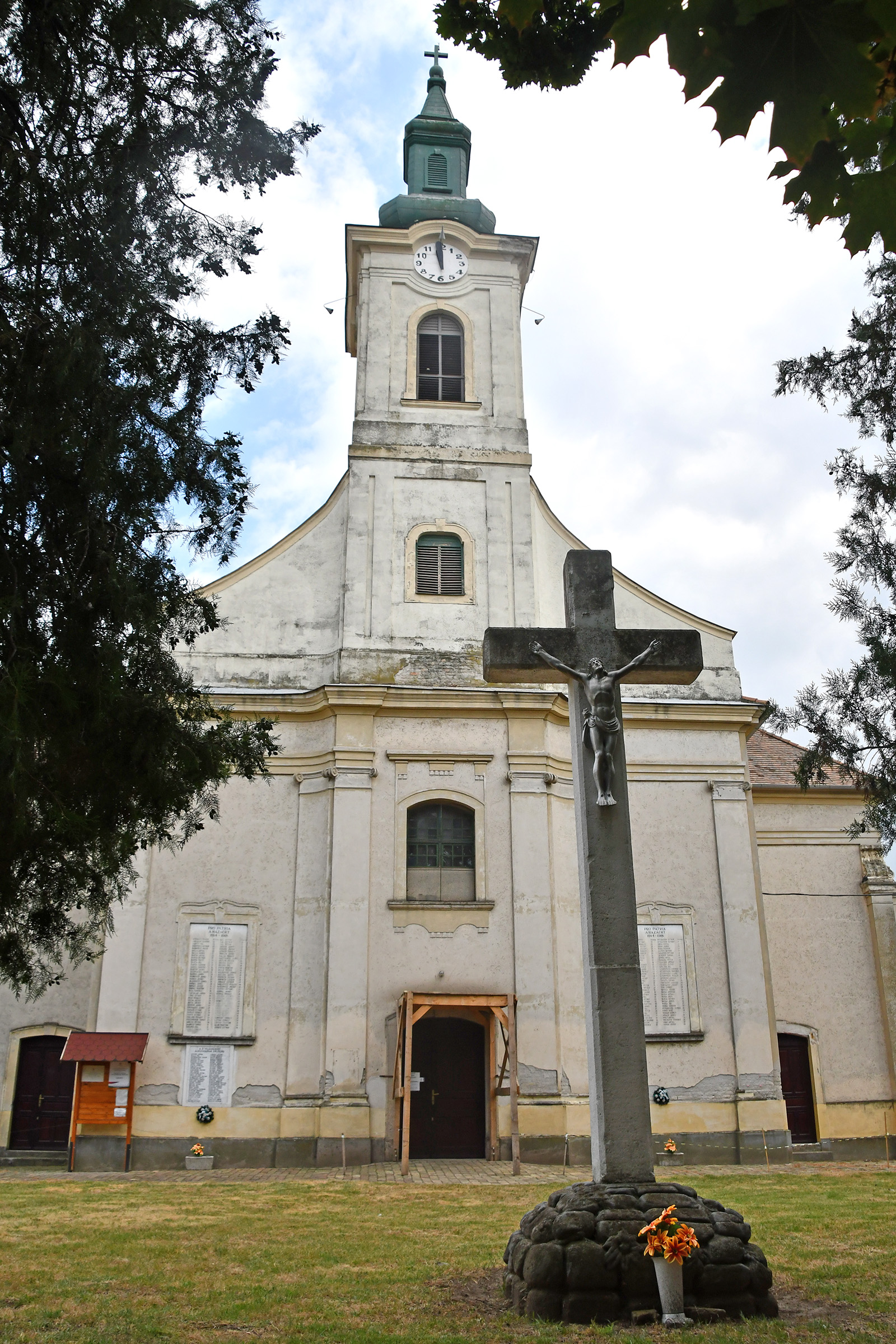

- Coat of arms

- Location of Madaras, Hungary
- Coordinates: 46°03′18″N 19°15′43″E
- Country: Hungary
- County: Bács-Kiskun County

Government
  - Type: Mayor-council government
  - Mayor: Csaba Balla (Független)

Area
  - Total: 49.3 km^{2} (19.0 sq mi)

Population (2018)
  - Total: 2,642
  - Density: 66.6/km^{2} (172/sq mi)
- Time zone: UTC+1 (CET)
  - Summer (DST): UTC+2 (CEST)
- Postal code: 6456
- Area code: 79

Madaras (Croatian: Madaraš) is a village in Bács-Kiskun county, Hungary.
