= Kunpeszér =

Coordinates: 47°04′N 19°17′E

- Interactive map of Kunpeszér
- Country: Hungary
- County: Bács-Kiskun

Area
  - Total: 77.55 km^{2} (29.94 sq mi)

Population (2015)
  - Total: 681
  - Density: 9/km^{2} (23/sq mi)
- Time zone: UTC+1 (CET)
  - Summer (DST): UTC+2 (CEST)
- Postal code: 6096
- Area code: 76

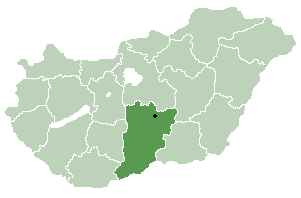
Location of Bács-Kiskun county in Hungary

Kunpeszér is a village in Bács-Kiskun county, in the Southern Great Plain region of southern Hungary.

== Geography ==
It covers an area of 77.55 km^{2} (30 sq mi) and has a population of 681 people (2015).
