= Bácsszőlős =

- Interactive map of Bácsszőlős
- Bácsszőlős
- Coordinates: 46.1500°N 19.4500°E
- Country: Hungary
- County: Bács-Kiskun

Area
  - Total: 38.83 km^{2} (14.99 sq mi)

Population (2005)
  - Total: 412
  - Density: 10.61/km^{2} (27.5/sq mi)
- Time zone: UTC+1 (CET)
  - Summer (DST): UTC+2 (CEST)
- Postal code: 6425
- Area code: 79

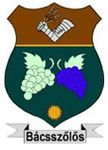
Coat of arms of Bácsszőlős, Hungary

Bácsszőlős (Croatian: Prlković, also Perleković and Crvena šuma) is a village and municipality in Bács-Kiskun county, in the Southern Great Plain region of southern Hungary.

== Geography ==
It covers an area of 38.83 km^{2} (15 sq mi) and has a population of 412 people (2005). The village is located near the southern border, 8 km from Bácsalmás. Its soil is sandy, suitable for viticulture, and also consists of black soils, on which a few large entrepreneurs carry out agricultural cultivation. The beauty of the outskirts of the settlement is given by the extensive forests, which are also suitable for hunting and game management.

== Trivia ==
2006, this village won the county award for the best decorated village (with flowers).
