= Öregcsertő =

Coordinates: 46°31′N 19°07′E

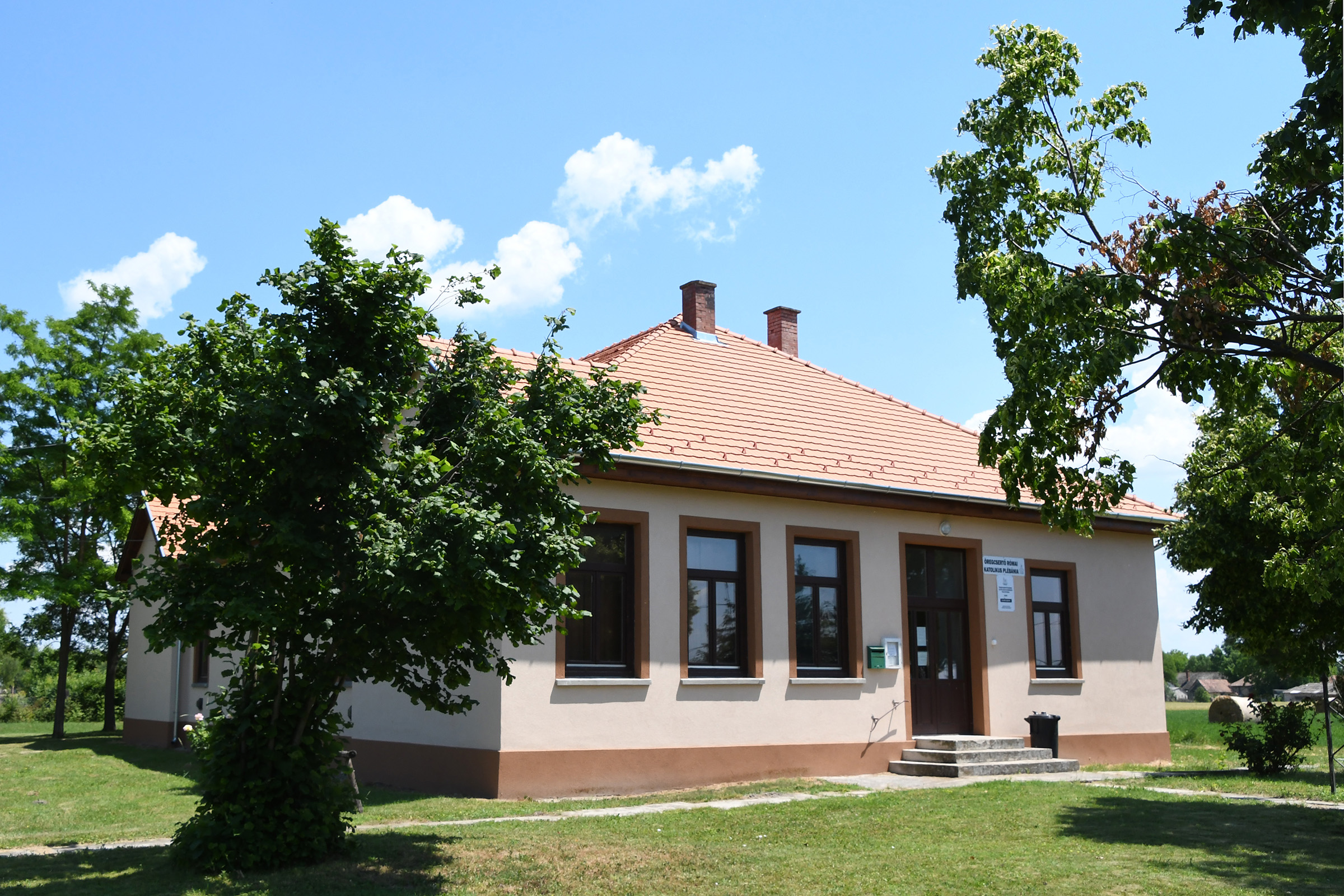
- Interactive map of Öregcsertő
- Country: Hungary
- County: Bács-Kiskun

Area
  - Total: 43.06 km^{2} (16.63 sq mi)

Population (2015)
  - Total: 760
  - Density: 17.7/km^{2} (46/sq mi)
- Time zone: UTC+1 (CET)
  - Summer (DST): UTC+2 (CEST)
- Postal code: 6311
- Area code: 78

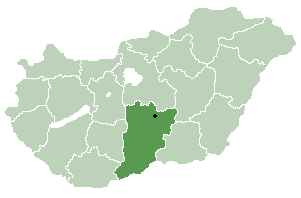
Location of Bács-Kiskun county in Hungary

Öregcsertő (Croatian: Čerta) is a village in Bács-Kiskun county, in the Southern Great Plain region of southern Hungary.

== Geography ==
It covers an area of 43.06 km^{2} (17 sq mi) and has a population of 760 people (2015).
