= Páhi =

Coordinates: 46°43′N 19°24′E

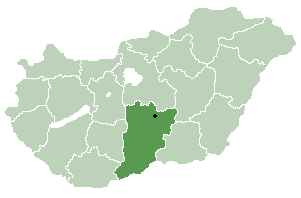
- Location of Bács-Kiskun county in Hungary
- Country: Hungary
- County: Bács-Kiskun

Area
  - Total: 38.96 km^{2} (15.04 sq mi)

Population (2015)
  - Total: 1,227
  - Density: 31.5/km^{2} (82/sq mi)
- Time zone: UTC+1 (CET)
  - Summer (DST): UTC+2 (CEST)
- Postal code: 6075
- Area code: 78

Páhi is a village in Bács-Kiskun county, in the Southern Great Plain region of southern Hungary.

== Geography ==
It covers an area of 38.96 km^{2} (15 sq mi) and has a population of 1227 people (2015).
