= Kéleshalom =

Place in Bács-Kiskun, Hungary

Coordinates: 46°22′N 19°15′E

- Interactive map of Kéleshalom
- Country: Hungary
- County: Bács-Kiskun

Area
  - Total: 61.63 km^{2} (23.80 sq mi)

Population (2015)
  - Total: 434
  - Density: 7/km^{2} (18/sq mi)
- Time zone: UTC+1 (CET)
  - Summer (DST): UTC+2 (CEST)
- Postal code: 644
- Area code: 77

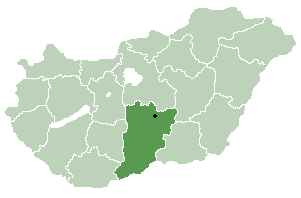
Location of Bács-Kiskun county in Hungary

Kéleshalom (Croatian: Kilaš) is a village in Bács-Kiskun county, in the Southern Great Plain region of southern Hungary.

== Geography ==
It covers an area of 5 km^{2} (2 sq mi) and has a population of 434 people (2015).
