= Uzsa =

- Flag Coat of arms

- Location of Veszprém county in Hungary

- Location of Uzsa
- Coordinates: 46°53′45″N 17°20′00″E
- Country: Hungary
- County: Veszprém

Government
  - Mayor: Táborosi László (Ind.)

Area
  - Total: 11.5 km^{2} (4.4 sq mi)

Population (2022)
  - Total: 306
  - Density: 26.6/km^{2} (68.9/sq mi)
- Time zone: UTC+1 (CET)
  - Summer (DST): UTC+2 (CEST)
- Postal code: 8321
- Area code: 87

Uzsa is a village in Veszprém county, Hungary.
