= Soltszentimre =

Coordinates: 46°46′N 19°17′E

- Interactive map of Soltszentimre
- Country: Hungary
- County: Bács-Kiskun

Area
  - Total: 44.49 km^{2} (17.18 sq mi)

Population (2023)
  - Total: 1,247
  - Density: 27.56/km^{2} (71.4/sq mi)
- Time zone: UTC+1 (CET)
  - Summer (DST): UTC+2 (CEST)
- Postal code: 6223
- Area code: 78

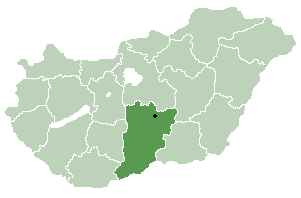
Location of Bács-Kiskun county in Hungary

Soltszentimre is a village in Bács-Kiskun County, in the Southern Great Plain region of southern Hungary.

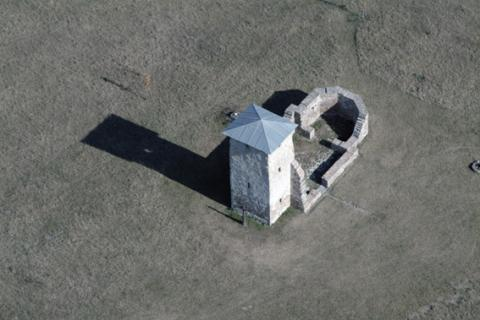
Aerial photography of Maimed Tower, Soltszentimre

== Geography ==
It covers an area of 44.49 km^{2} (17 sq mi) and has a population of 1247 people (2023). It is situated 20 km away from Kiskőrös, and 50 km from Kecskemét.
