= Rém =

- Municipality
- Map showing Rém in Hungary
- Coordinates: 46°15′N 19°09′E
- Country: Hungary
- County: Bács-Kiskun

Government
  - Type: Mayor-council government
  - Mayor: Imréné Papp (Ind.)

Area
  - Total: 39.93 km^{2} (15.42 sq mi)

Population (2018)
  - Total: 1,233
  - Density: 30.88/km^{2} (79.98/sq mi)
- Time zone: UTC+1 (CET)
  - Summer (DST): UTC+2 (CEST)
- Postal code: 6446
- Area code: 79
- Geocode: 26310

Historical population
Year	Pop.	±%
1961	1,873	—
1971	1,635	−12.7%
1981	1,544	−5.6%
1991	1,476	−4.4%
2001	1,395	−5.5%
2011	1,325	−5.0%
2018	1,233	−6.9%
Source: Eurostat

Rém (Croatian: Rim) is a village and municipality (Hungarian: község) in Bács-Kiskun county, Hungary.

== Geography ==
It covers an area of 39.93 km^{2} (15 sq mi) and had a population of 1,233 people as of 2018.

== Demographics ==
In the 2011 census, the municipality had a population of 1,324 individuals, with 93.4% of the population reporting to be Hungarian, 1.3% German, 1.2% Roma, and 6.4% declining to answer. The majority of the population were adherents of Roman Catholicism (68.6%), with 14.7% following no religion and 11.8% declining to answer.
