= Ordas =

Coordinates: 46°38′10″N 18°57′00″E

- Interactive map of Ordas
- Country: Hungary
- County: Bács-Kiskun

Area
  - Total: 16.31 km^{2} (6.30 sq mi)

Population (2025)
  - Total: 437
- Time zone: UTC+1 (CET)
  - Summer (DST): UTC+2 (CEST)
- Postal code: 6335
- Area code: 78

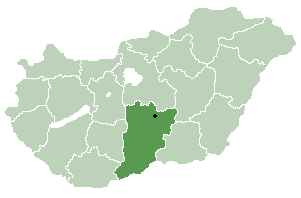
Location of Bács-Kiskun county in the Southern Great Plain region

Ordas is a village and municipality in Bács-Kiskun county, in the Southern Great Plain region of southern Hungary.

== Geography ==
It covers an area of 16.31 km^{2} (6 sq mi) and has a population of 502 people (2005).
