= Tabdi =

Coordinates: 46°40′59″N 19°18′11″E

- Interactive map of Tabdi
- Country: Hungary
- County: Bács-Kiskun

Area
  - Total: 21.39 km^{2} (8.26 sq mi)

Population (2002)
  - Total: 1,196
  - Density: 56/km^{2} (150/sq mi)
- Time zone: UTC+1 (CET)
  - Summer (DST): UTC+2 (CEST)
- Postal code: 6224
- Area code: 78

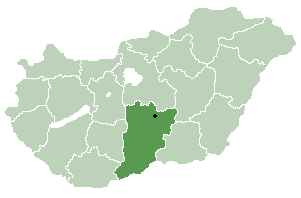
Location of Bács-Kiskun county in the Southern Great Plain region

Tabdi is a village and municipality in Bács-Kiskun county, in the Southern Great Plain region of southern Hungary.

Croats in Hungary call this village Tobdin.

== Geography ==
It covers an area of 21.39 km^{2} (8 sq mi) and has a population of 1196 people (2002).
