= Dunaszentbenedek =

Coordinates: 46°35′38″N 18°53′31″E

- Interactive map of Dunaszentbenedek
- Country: Hungary
- County: Bács-Kiskun

Area
  - Total: 23.24 km^{2} (8.97 sq mi)

Population (2025)
  - Total: 734
- Time zone: UTC+1 (CET)
  - Summer (DST): UTC+2 (CEST)
- Postal code: 6333
- Area code: 78

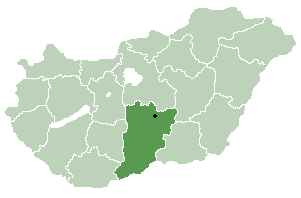
Location of Bács-Kiskun county in Hungary

Dunaszentbenedek (Croatian: Sabendak) is a village and municipality in Bács-Kiskun county, in the Southern Great Plain region of southern Hungary. The name Dunaszentbenedek comes from the river Duna (Danube).

== Geography ==
It covers an area of 23.24 km^{2} (9 sq mi) and has a population of 960 people (2005).
