= Gátér =

Coordinates: 46.68°N 19.96°E

- Interactive map of Gátér
- Country: Hungary
- County: Bács-Kiskun

Area
  - Total: 30.89 km^{2} (11.93 sq mi)

Population (2015)
  - Total: 919
  - Density: 29.8/km^{2} (77/sq mi)
- Time zone: UTC+1 (CET)
  - Summer (DST): UTC+2 (CEST)
- Postal code: 6111
- Area code: 76

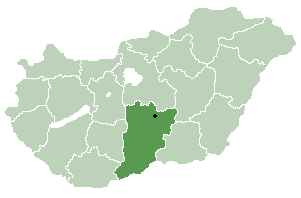
Location of Bács-Kiskun county in Hungary

Gátér is a village in Bács-Kiskun county, in the Southern Great Plain region of southern Hungary.

== Geography ==
It covers an area of 30.89 km^{2} (12 sq mi) and has a population of 919 people (2015).
