= Bugacpusztaháza =

Coordinates: 46°42′00″N 19°37′48″E

- Interactive map of Bugacpusztaháza
- Country: Hungary
- County: Bács-Kiskun

Area
  - Total: 43 km^{2} (17 sq mi)

Population (2025)
  - Total: 254
- Time zone: UTC+1 (CET)
  - Summer (DST): UTC+2 (CEST)
- Postal code: 6114
- Area code: 76

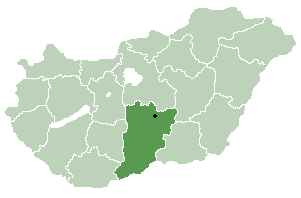
Location of Bács-Kiskun county in Hungary region

Bugacpusztaháza is a village and municipality in Bács-Kiskun county, in the Southern Great Plain region of southern Hungary.

== Geography ==
It covers an area of 43 km^{2} (17 sq mi) and has a population of 308 people (2005).
