= Pálmonostora =

Coordinates: 46°38′N 19°57′E

- Interactive map of Pálmonostora
- Country: Hungary
- County: Bács-Kiskun

Area
  - Total: 53.29 km^{2} (20.58 sq mi)

Population (2015)
  - Total: 1,801
  - Density: 33.8/km^{2} (88/sq mi)
- Time zone: UTC+1 (CET)
  - Summer (DST): UTC+2 (CEST)
- Postal code: 6112
- Area code: 76

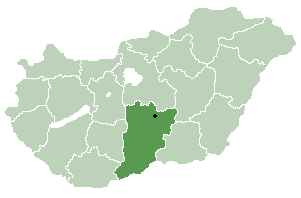
Location of Bács-Kiskun county in Hungary

Pálmonostora is a village in Bács-Kiskun county, in the Southern Great Plain region of southern Hungary.

== Geography ==
It covers an area of 53.29 km^{2} (21 sq mi) and has a population of 1801 people (2015).
