= Kömpöc =

Coordinates: 46°28′N 19°52′E

- Interactive map of Kömpöc
- Country: Hungary
- County: Bács-Kiskun

Area
  - Total: 30 km^{2} (12 sq mi)

Population (2002)
  - Total: 803
  - Density: 27/km^{2} (70/sq mi)
- Time zone: UTC+1 (CET)
  - Summer (DST): UTC+2 (CEST)
- Postal code: 6134
- Area code: 77

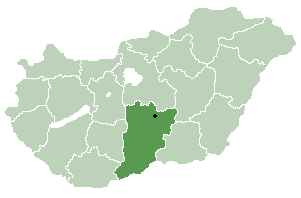
Location of Bács-Kiskun county in Hungary

Kömpöc is a village in Bács-Kiskun county, in the Southern Great Plain region of southern Hungary.

Croats in Hungary call this village Kempac and Kompac.

== Geography ==
It covers an area of 30 km^{2} (12 sq mi) and has a population of 803 people (2002).
