= Újsolt =

Coordinates: 46°52′N 19°07′E

- Interactive map of Újsolt
- Country: Hungary
- County: Bács-Kiskun

Area
  - Total: 32.89 km^{2} (12.70 sq mi)

Population (2025)
  - Total: 159
  - Density: 16/km^{2} (41/sq mi)
- Time zone: UTC+1 (CET)
  - Summer (DST): UTC+2 (CEST)
- Postal code: 6320
- Area code: 78

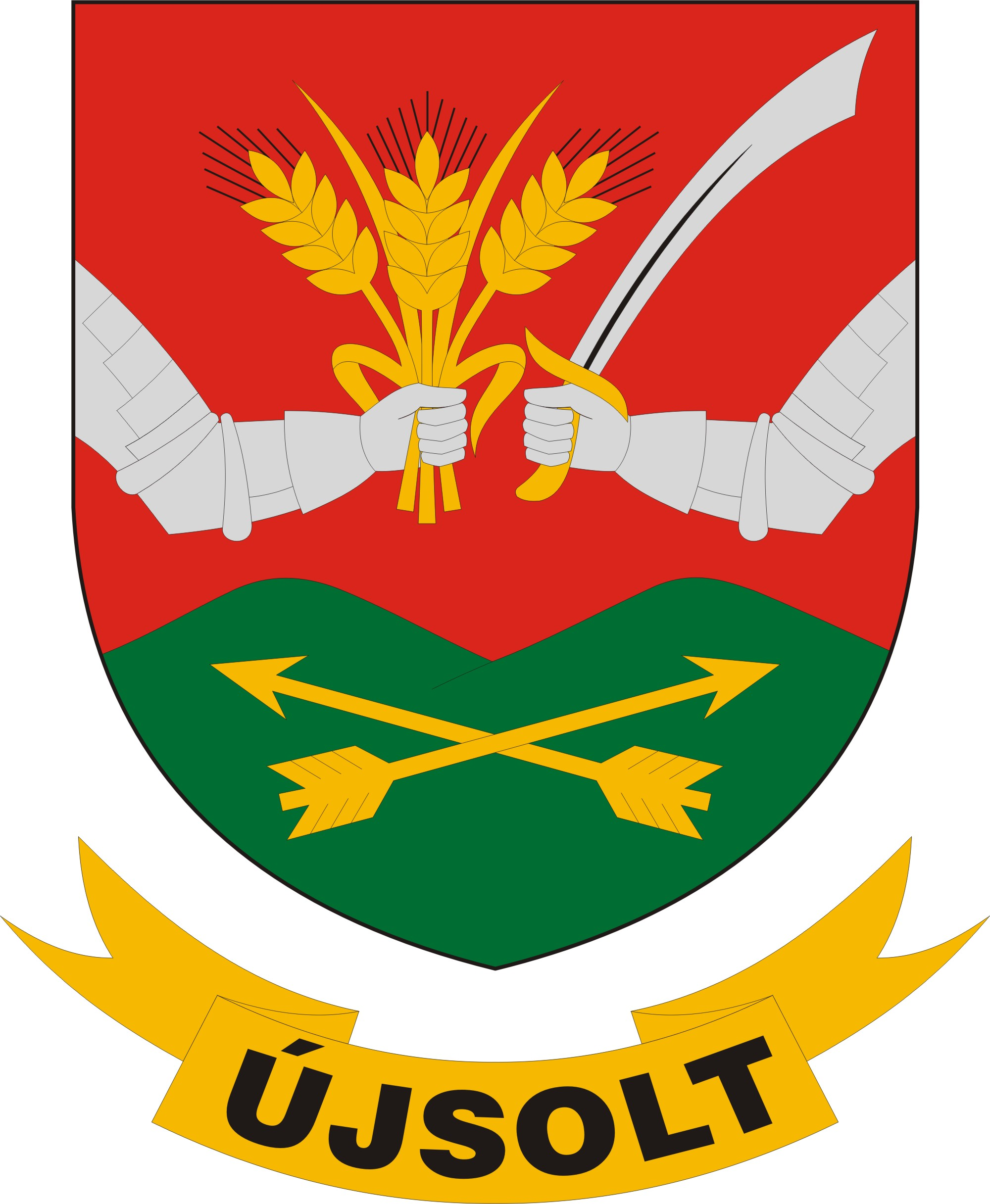
Coat of arms of Újsolt, Hungary

Újsolt is a village in Bács-Kiskun county, Hungary with 159 inhabitants (as of 2025). It is a mainly agricultural village.

The village includes two watchmounds which were developed during the Árpád dynasty. The area of the village was owned by Count Albert Nemes in the early 20th century. One of his tenants, Tóth, owned a farmstead called Tóth major, which later became Újsolt.

The village was part of the town of Solt until 1950 when it became independent.
