= Újtelek =

Coordinates: 46°35′N 19°04′E

- Interactive map of Újtelek
- Country: Hungary
- County: Bács-Kiskun

Area
  - Total: 9.56 km^{2} (3.69 sq mi)

Population (2015)
  - Total: 350
  - Density: 36.6/km^{2} (95/sq mi)
- Time zone: UTC+1 (CET)
  - Summer (DST): UTC+2 (CEST)
- Postal code: 6337
- Area code: 78

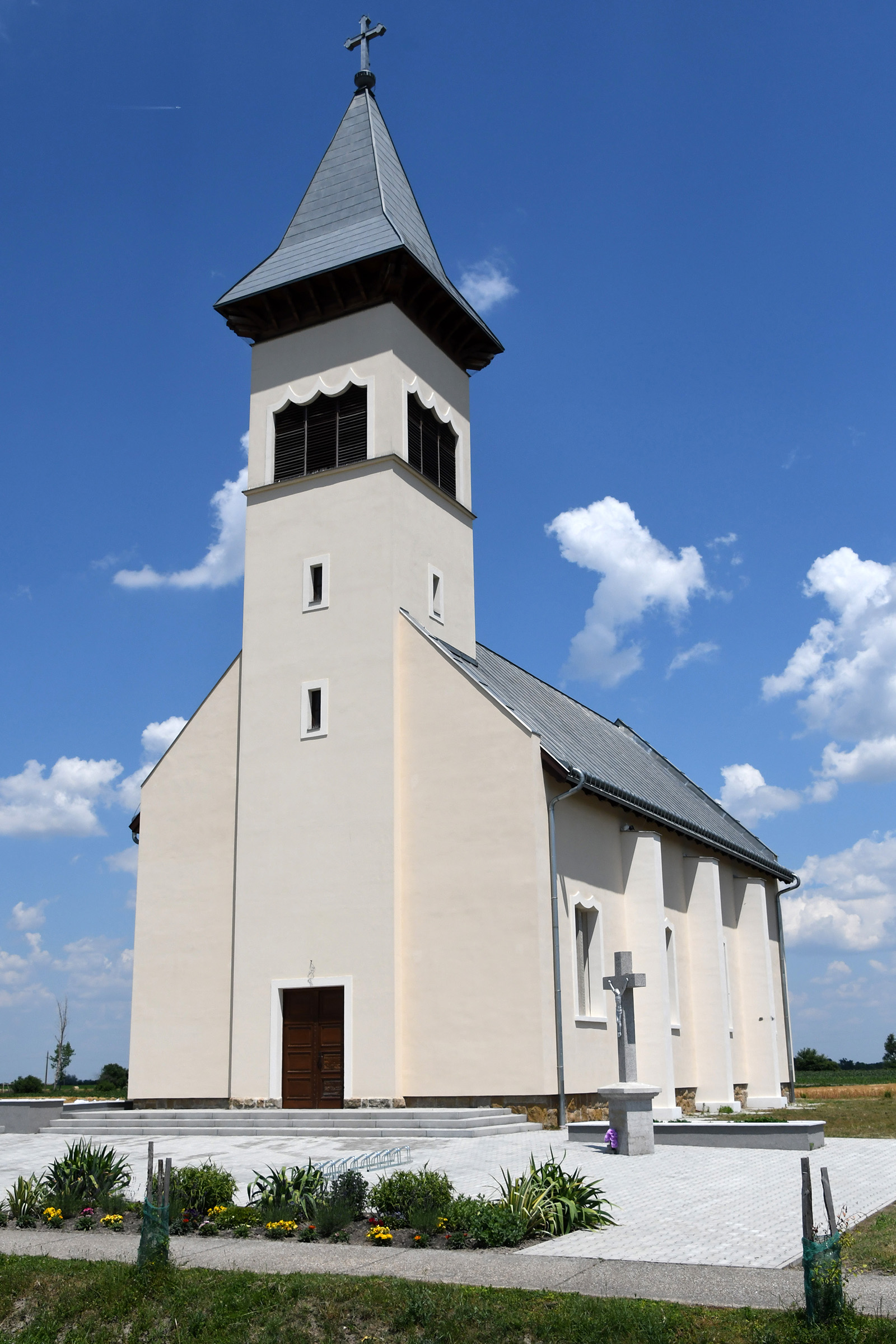
Church in Újtelek

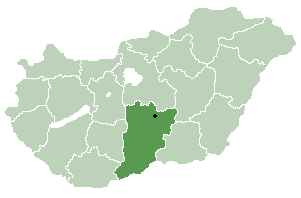
Location of Bács-Kiskun county in Hungary

Újtelek is a village in Bács-Kiskun county, in the Southern Great Plain region of southern Hungary.

== Geography ==
It covers an area of 9.56 km^{2} (4 sq mi) and has a population of 350 people (2015).
