= Szank =

Coordinates: 46°33′14″N 19°40′01″E

- Interactive map of Szank
- Country: Hungary
- County: Bács-Kiskun

Area
  - Total: 74.83 km^{2} (28.89 sq mi)

Population (2005)
  - Total: 2,622
  - Density: 35.03/km^{2} (90.7/sq mi)
- Time zone: UTC+1 (CET)
  - Summer (DST): UTC+2 (CEST)
- Postal code: 6131
- Area code: 77

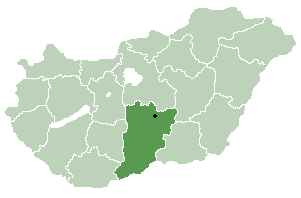
Location of Bács-Kiskun county in the Southern Great Plain region

Szank is a village in Bács-Kiskun county, in the Southern Great Plain region of southern Hungary.

== Geography ==
It covers an area of 74.83 km^{2} (29 sq mi) and has a population of 2622 people (2005).

== Twin cities ==
- Porumbenii Mari Romania
- Mauru Finland
- Bačka Topola Serbia
- Quindici Italy
- Hiiumaa Estonia
