= Móricgát =

Coordinates: 46°38′N 19°40′E

- Flag Coat of arms
- Interactive map of Móricgát
- Country: Hungary
- County: Bács-Kiskun

Area
  - Total: 32.88 km^{2} (12.70 sq mi)

Population (2002)
  - Total: 554
  - Density: 16.84/km^{2} (43.6/sq mi)
- Time zone: UTC+1 (CET)
  - Summer (DST): UTC+2 (CEST)
- Postal code: 6132
- Area code: 77

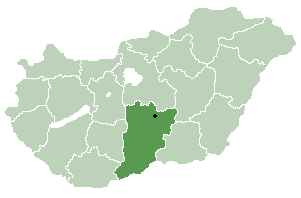
Location of Bács-Kiskun county in Hungary

Móricgát is a village in Bács-Kiskun county, in the Southern Great Plain region of southern Hungary.

== Geography ==
It covers an area of 32.88 km^{2} (13 sq mi) and has a population of 554 people (2002).
