= Uszód =

Coordinates: 46°34′N 18°55′E

- Interactive map of Uszód
- Country: Hungary
- County: Bács-Kiskun

Area
  - Total: 24.46 km^{2} (9.44 sq mi)

Population (2015)
  - Total: 1,001
  - Density: 40.9/km^{2} (106/sq mi)
- Time zone: UTC+1 (CET)
  - Summer (DST): UTC+2 (CEST)
- Postal code: 6332
- Area code: 78

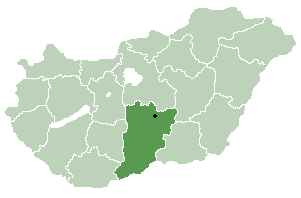
Location of Bács-Kiskun county in Hungary

Uszód (Croatian: Vusad) is a village in Bács-Kiskun county, in the Southern Great Plain region of southern Hungary.

== History ==
The village was first mentioned in historical records in 1318.

== Geography ==
It covers an area of 24.46 km^{2} (9 sq mi) and has a population of 1001 people (2015).

== Economy ==
The economy is primarily based on agriculture. The village has a village hall.
