= Csólyospálos =

- Coat of arms

- Location of Csólyospálos in Hungary
- Coordinates: 46.418°N 19.841°E
- Country: Hungary
- Region: Southern Great Plain
- County: Bács-Kiskun
- Subregion: Kiskunmajsai
- Rank: Village

Area
  - Total: 65.10 km^{2} (25.14 sq mi)

Population (1 January 2008)
  - Total: 1,728
  - Density: 26.54/km^{2} (68.75/sq mi)
- Time zone: UTC+1 (CET)
  - Summer (DST): UTC+2 (CEST)
- Postal code: 6135
- Area code: +36 77
- KSH code: 12025
- Website: www.csolyospalos.hu

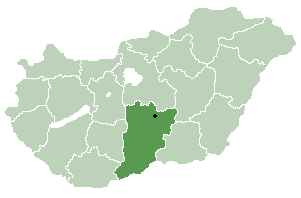
Bács-Kiskun county

Csólyospálos is a village in Bács-Kiskun county, Hungary.
