= Bács-Kiskun County 5th constituency =

Hungarian national legislative constituency

Bács-Kiskun County 5th constituency (Kiskunhalas)
- Constituency for the National Assembly
- Location of Bács-Kiskun county 05 within Bács-Kiskun county

- Location of Bács-Kiskun county within Hungary
- County: Bács-Kiskun
- Electorate: 68,267 (2022)
- Major settlements: Kiskunhalas

Current constituency
- Created: 2011
- Party: Tisza Party
- Member: Katalin Karsai-Juhász
- Elected: 2026
- Coordinates: 46°25′55″N 19°29′18″E

The 5th constituency of Bács-Kiskun County (Hungarian: Bács-Kiskun megyei 05. számú országgyűlési egyéni választókerület) is one of the single member constituencies of the National Assembly, the national legislature of Hungary. The constituency standard abbreviation: Bács-Kiskun 05. OEVK.

Since 2026, it has been represented by Katalin Karsai-Juhász of the Tisza Party.

== Geography ==
The 5th constituency is located in south-eastern part of Bács-Kiskun County.

=== List of municipalities ===
The constituency includes the following municipalities:

1. Bácsalmás
2. Bácsszőlős
3. Balotaszállás
4. Borota
5. Császártöltés
6. Csikéria
7. Hajós
8. Harkakötöny
9. Imrehegy
10. Jánoshalma
11. Kecel
12. Kelebia
13. Kéleshalom
14. Kiskunhalas
15. Kisszállás
16. Kunbaja
17. Kunfehértó
18. Mélykút
19. Pirtó
20. Tataháza
21. Tázlár
22. Tompa
23. Zsana

== Members ==
The constituency was first represented by Gábor Bányai of the Fidesz from 2014, and he was re-elected in 2018 and 2022. In the 2026 election, Katalin Karsai-Juhász of the Tisza Party was elected representative.

Election	Member	Party	%	Ref.
2014	Gábor Bányai	Fidesz	51.25	
2018	Gábor Bányai	Fidesz	55.85	
2022	Gábor Bányai	Fidesz	60.16	
2026	Katalin Karsai-Juhász	Tisza Party	49.97	
