= Kiskunhalas District =

Coordinates: 46.3667°N 19.5333°E

Kiskunhalas District Kiskunhalasi járás
- Districts of Hungary
- Coat of arms

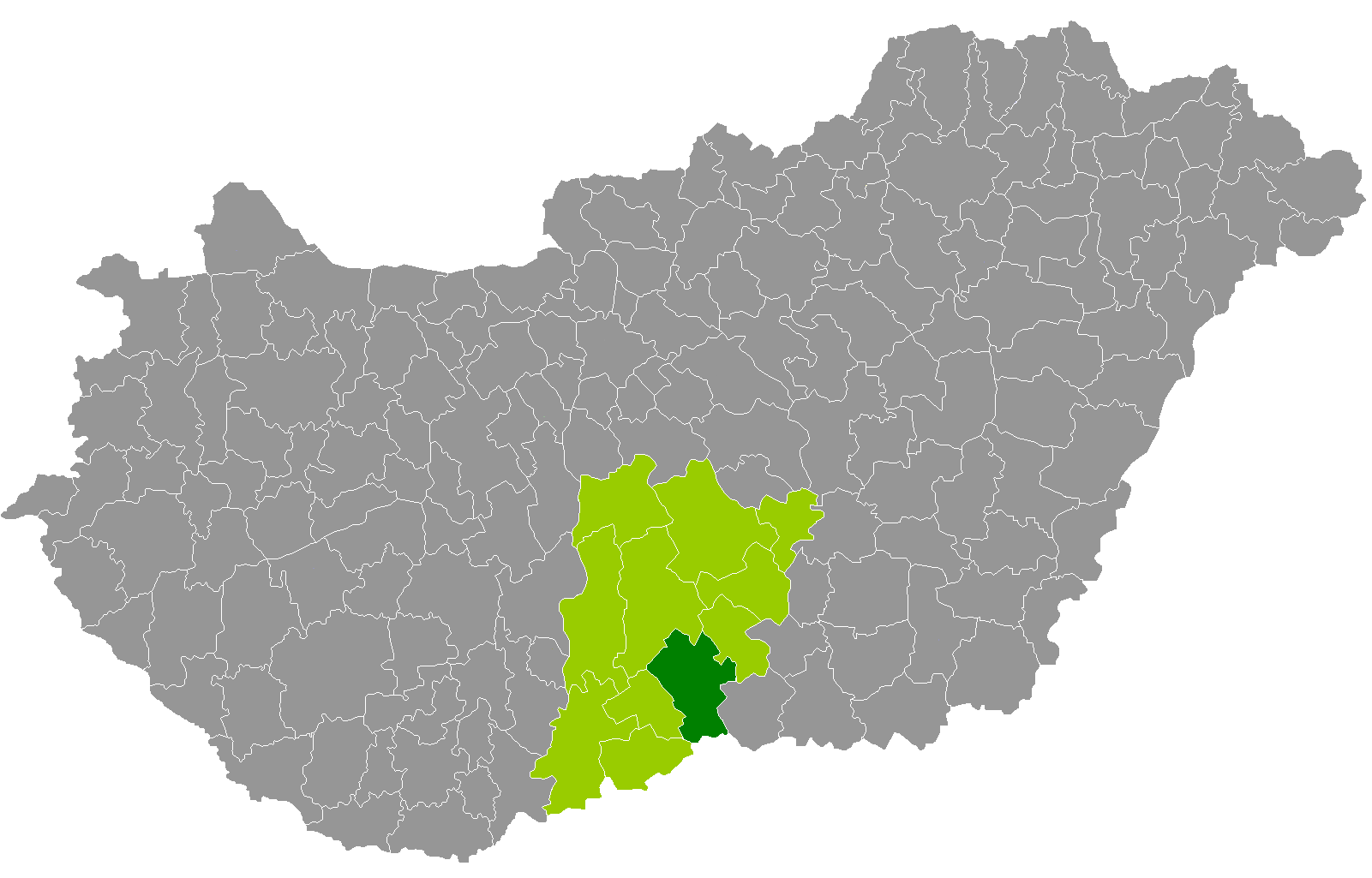
- Kiskunhalas District within Hungary and Bács-Kiskun County.
- Country: Hungary
- County: Bács-Kiskun
- District seat: Kiskunhalas

Area
  - Total: 826.35 km^{2} (319.06 sq mi)
  - Rank: 5th in Bács-Kiskun

Population (2022 census)
  - Total: 41,032
  - Rank: 5th in Bács-Kiskun
  - Density: 49.65/km^{2} (128.6/sq mi)

Kiskunhalas (Hungarian: Kiskunhalasi járás) is a district in south-eastern part of Bács-Kiskun County. Kiskunhalas is also the name of the town where the district seat is found. The district is located in the Southern Great Plain Statistical Region.

== Geography ==
Kiskunhalas District borders with Kiskunmajsa District to the northeast, Mórahalom District (Csongrád County) to the east, the Serbian district of North Bačka and Bácsalmás District to the south, Jánoshalma District to the west, Kiskőrös District to the northwest. The number of the inhabited places in Kiskunhalas District is 9.

== Municipalities ==
The district has 2 towns and 7 villages. (ordered by population, as of 1 January 2012)

- Balotaszállás (1,497)
- Harkakötöny (934)
- Kelebia (2,583)
- **Kiskunhalas** (28,427) – district seat
- Kisszállás (2,396)
- Kunfehértó (2,014)
- Pirtó (941)
- **Tompa** (4,543)
- Zsana (752)

The bolded municipalities are cities.

== Demographics ==
Religion in Kiskunhalas District (2011 census)
1. Catholic Church (43.1%)
2. Greek Catholicism (0.10%)
3. Calvinism (8.10%)
4. Lutheranism (0.90%)
5. Other religions (1.90%)
6. Non-religious (18.3%)
7. Atheists (1.00%)
8. Undeclared (26.6%)

In 2011, it had a population of 43,849 and the population density was 53/km^{2}.

Year	County population	Change
2011	43,849	n/a
2022	41,032	-6,4%

=== Ethnicity ===
Besides the Hungarian majority, the main minorities are the Roma (approx. 1,800), German (500), Serb and Croat (100).

Total population (2011 census): 43,849
Ethnic groups (2011 census): Identified themselves: 41,062 persons:

- Hungarians: 38,161 (92.94%)
- Gypsies: 1,774 (4.32%)
- Germans: 479 (1.17%)
- Others and indefinable: 648 (1.58%)

Approx. 3,000 persons in Kiskunhalas District did not declare their ethnic group at the 2011 census.

=== Religion ===
Religious adherence in the county according to 2011 census:

- Catholic – 18,978 (Roman Catholic – 18,910; Greek Catholic – 66);
- Reformed – 3,565;
- Evangelical – 376;
- other religions – 828;
- Non-religious – 8,023;
- Atheism – 419;
- Undeclared – 11,660.

== Gallery ==
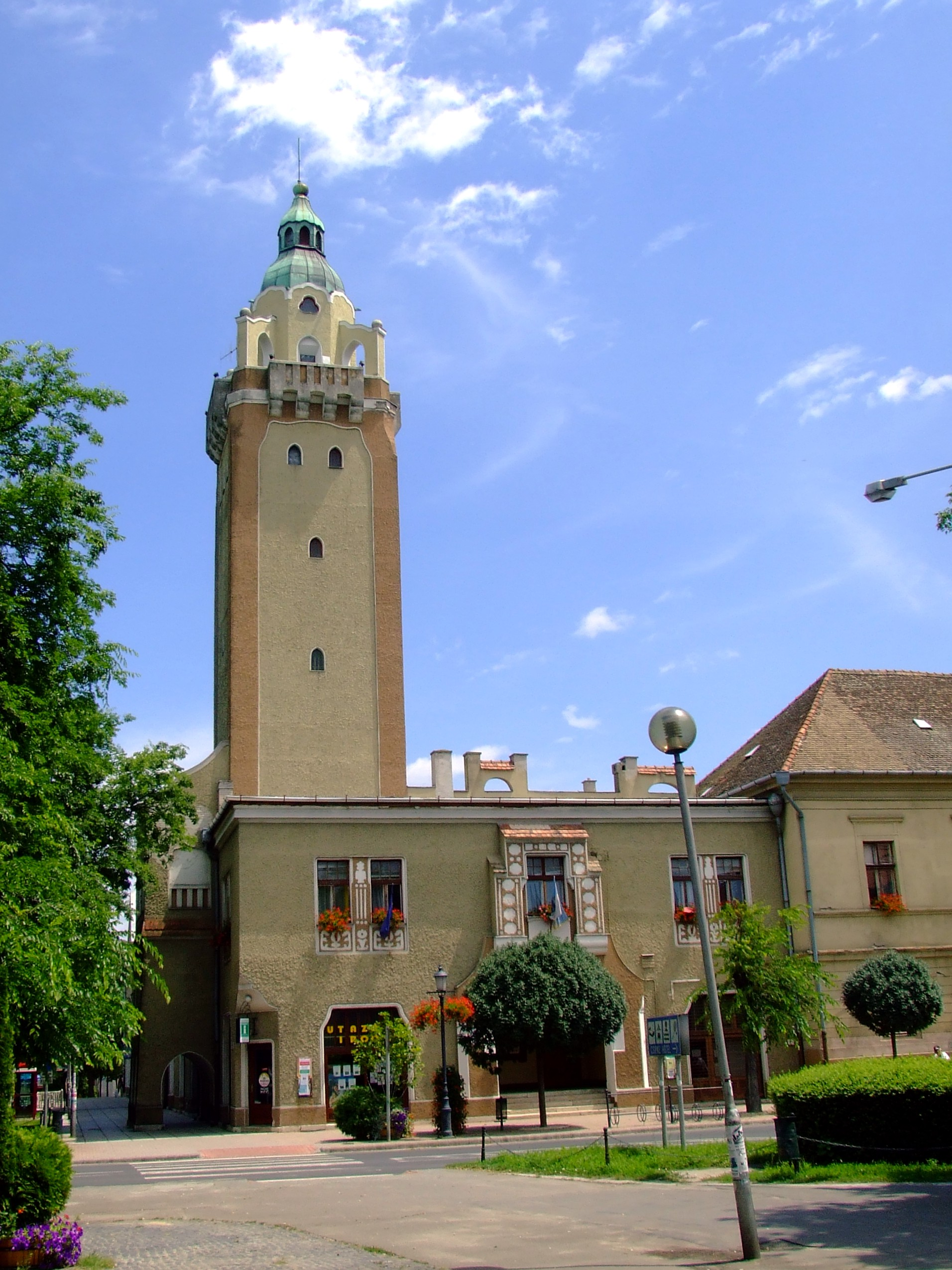
Kiskunhalas, Town Hall

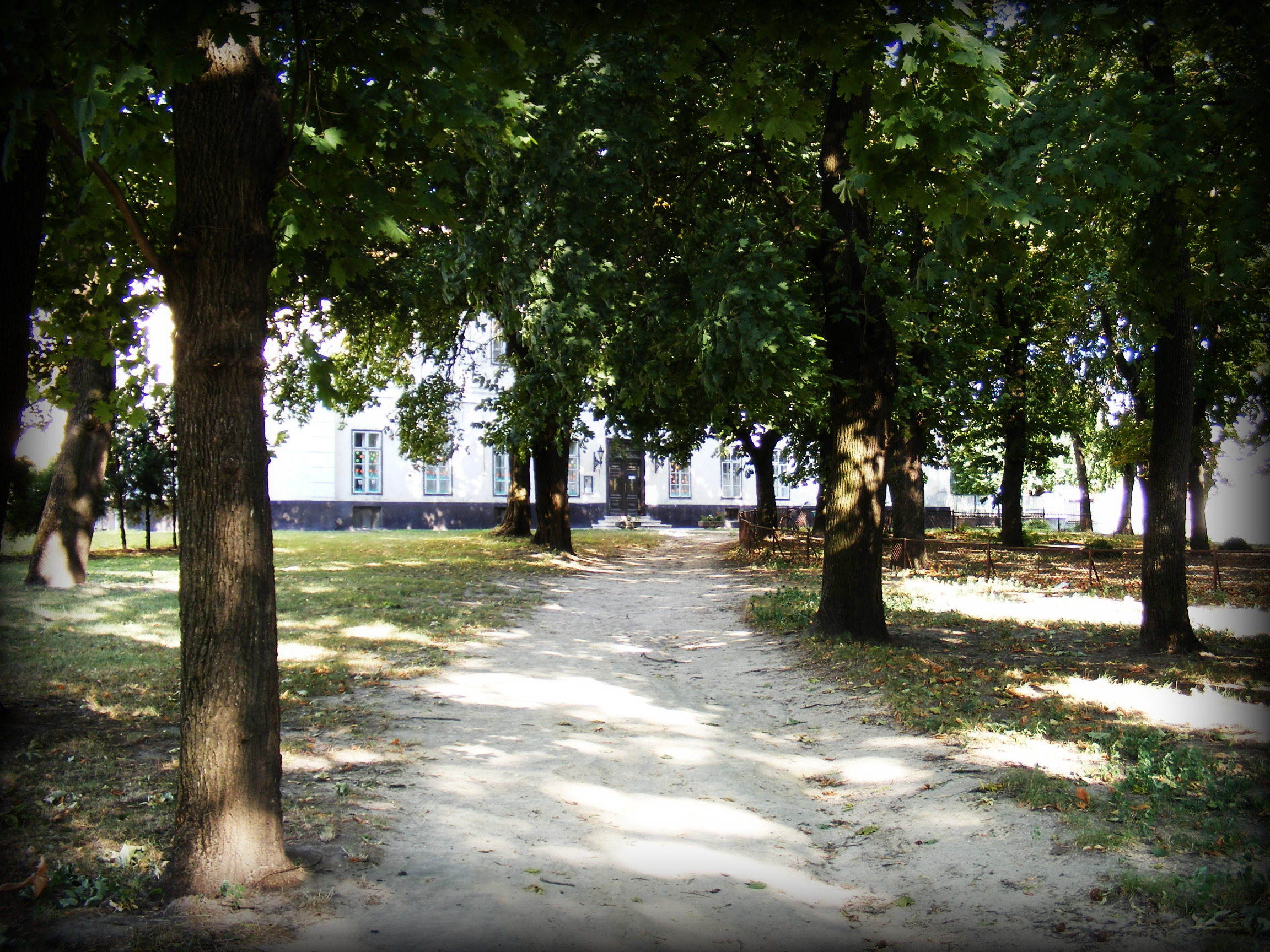
Boncompagni Mansion in Kisszállás

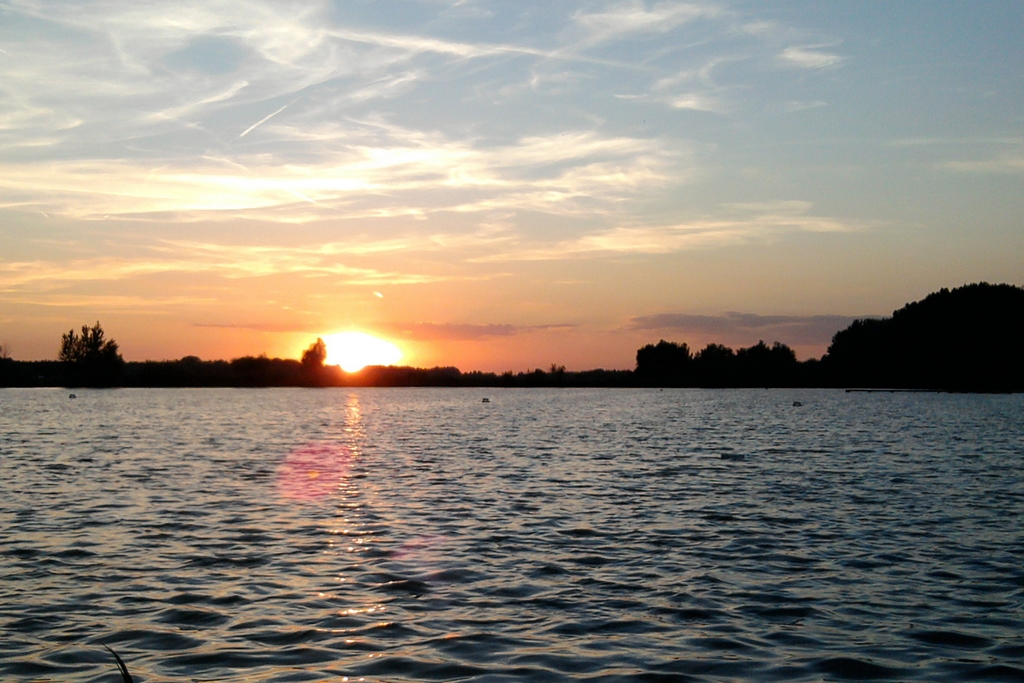
Lake in Kunfehértó

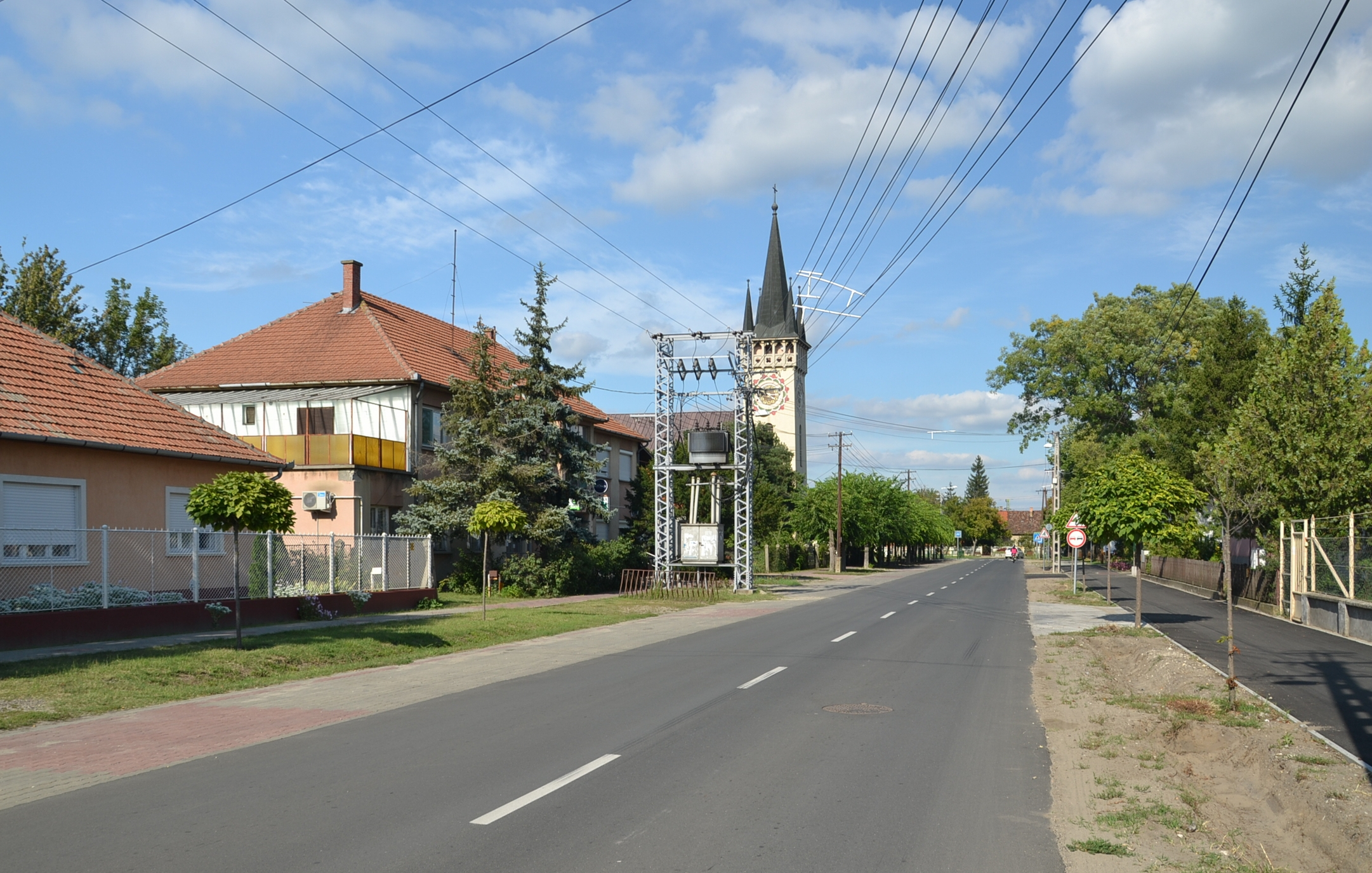
View of Kelebia

== See also ==
- List of cities and towns of Hungary
