= Gergely Farkas =

Hungarian politician

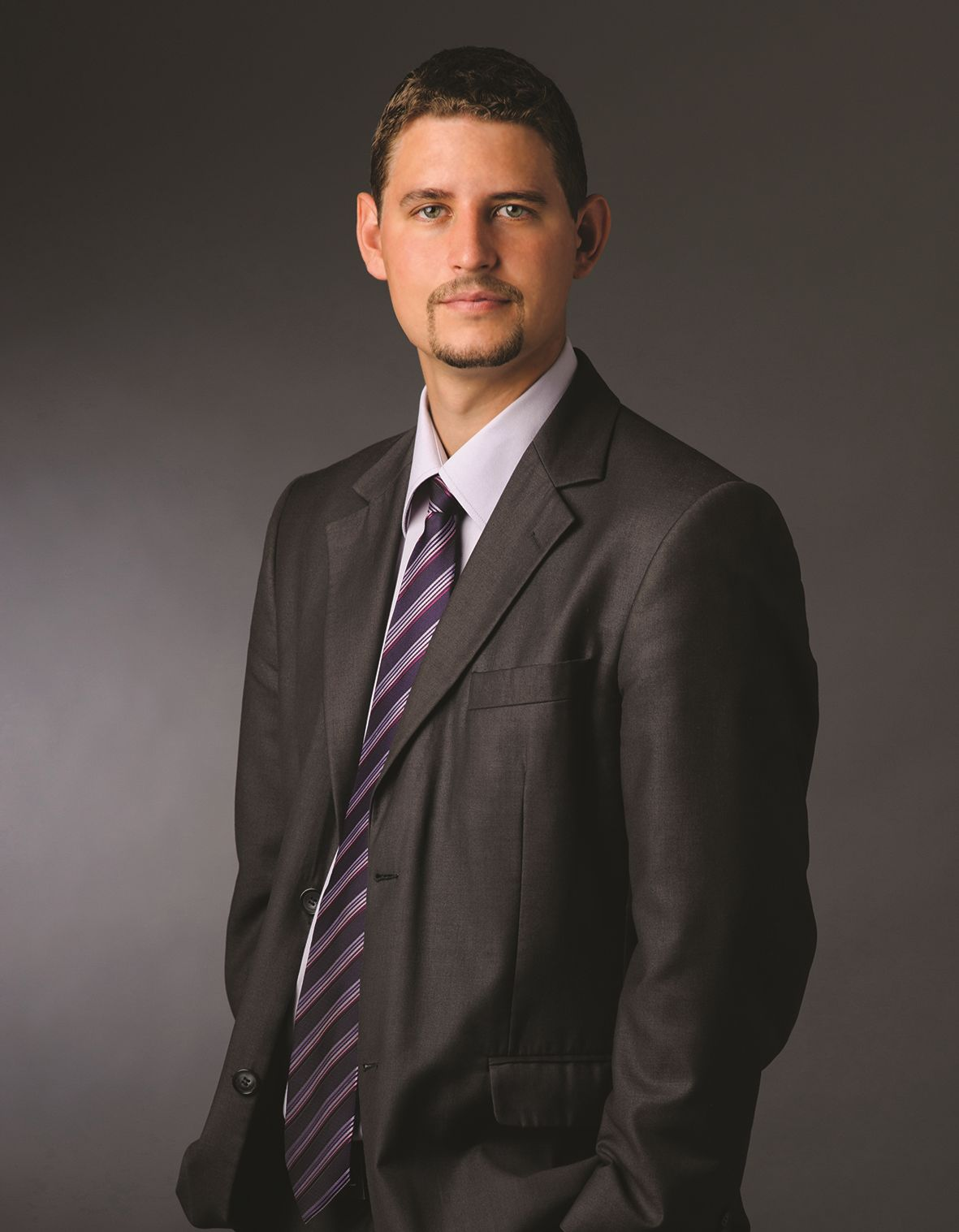
- Gergely Farkas in 2014

Member of the National Assembly
- In office 14 May 2010 – 1 May 2022

Personal details
- Born: 3 November 1986 (age 39) Kecel, Hungary
- Party: Jobbik (2005–2020)
- Profession: economist, sociologist, politician

Gergely Farkas (born 3 November 1986) is a Hungarian politician who was a member of the National Assembly (MP) between 2010 and 2022, sitting as a Jobbik politician until 2020, then as a non-partisan. He served as the inaugural president of the Jobbik Young Section (Jobbik IT) from 2013 to 2019.

== Profession ==
Gergely Farkas was born in Kecel on 3 November 1986. He is Roman Catholic. He finished his secondary studies at the Bolyai János Secondary Grammar School of Kecskemét in 2005. He earned a degree of sociologist-economist in the Corvinus University of Budapest in 2013.

== Political career ==
=== Party positions ===
Farkas was an activist of the newly founded Jobbik since 2003. He joined the party itself in 2005, establishing its local branch in his birthplace Kecel. He presided the Kecel branch from 2005 until 2019. He served as chief of staff of party president Gábor Vona between January 2008 and the summer of 2009. He was elected vice-president of the party's electoral board in September 2009, serving in this capacity until April 2012. He was a domestic assistant of MEP Zoltán Balczó from September 2009 to May 2010.

He was involved in the Jobbik Young Section since its foundation in 2011 as a member of its collective leadership from 2011 to 2013. At the inaugural convention on 2013 the members of the young section elected Gergely Farkas for the first president of Jobbik Young Section. He was re-elected in 2015 and 2017. He did not run for the position in 2019. He was replaced by Gergő Keresztesy in February 2019.

=== Member of Parliament ===
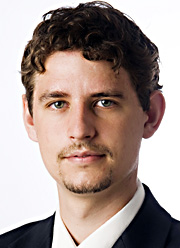
Gergely Farkas in 2010

Farkas was elected a Member of Parliament via the Nógrád County regional list of the Jobbik in the 2010 parliamentary election. He functioned as whip of the Jobbik parliamentary group between 2010 and 2014. Due to his young age, he acted as a senior recorder in the inaugural sessions of the National Assembly in 2010, 2014 and 2018.

Farkas unsuccessfully ran for an individual seat in Kiskunhalas (Bács-Kiskun County 5th constituency) in the 2014 and 2018 parliamentary elections, he was defeated by Fidesz candidate Gábor Bányai both times. Nevertheless, Farkas gained mandate via the national list of the Jobbik in both elections. He served as a deputy leader of the Jobbik parliamentary group between 2014 and 2020. He was a member of the Committee on Consumer Protection from May to October 2010, the Committee on Education, Science and Research from October 2010 to May 2014, the Committee on Culture from 2014 to 2020 and the Legislative Committee from 2020 to 2022.

During the campaign of the 2018 national election it was revealed that Farkas offered money to Melánia Midi, candidate of the Politics Can Be Different (LMP) in Kiskunhalas constituency in exchange for her withdrawal of candidacy. He acknowledged the fact of the discussion, but said the request was just a "funny suggestion".

Disagreeing with the direction and methods of the new party leadership led by Péter Jakab, who was elected president of Jobbik in January 2020, Farkas announced his quit from Jobbik and its parliamentary group on 27 May 2020, together with Tamás Sneider and Andrea Varga-Damm. Farkas said "I no longer want to assist Péter Jakab and his team in their activities, which have plunged this party that had seen better days into political and moral depravity." He added "the current Jobbik is not my community". Farkas continued his work in the parliament as an independent MP. He did not participate in the 2022 parliamentary election.
