= Akasztó =

Village in Bács-Kiskun, Hungary

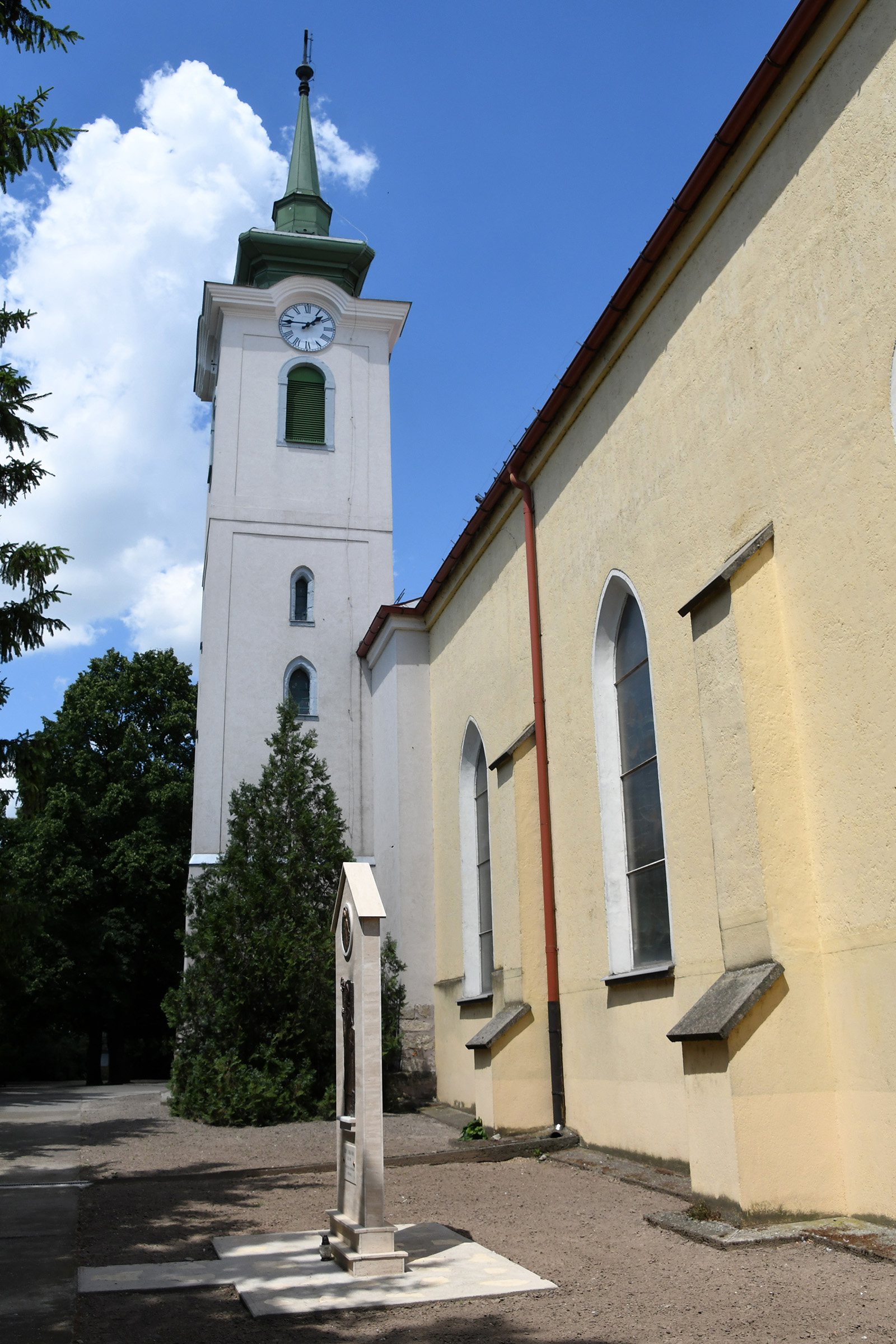
- Catholic Church of the Blessed Virgin Mary in Akasztó.

- Flag Coat of arms

- Location within Bács-Kiskun County Location within Hungary
- Coordinates: 46°41′28″N 19°12′19″E
- Country: Hungary
- County: Bács-Kiskun
- District: Kiskőrös

Government
  - Mayor: Suhajda Antal (Ind.)

Area
  - Total: 64.88 km^{2} (25.05 sq mi)

Population (2022)
  - Total: 3,165
  - Density: 53.68/km^{2} (139.0/sq mi)
- Time zone: UTC+1 (CET)
  - Summer (DST): UTC+2 (CEST)
- Postal code: 6221
- Area code: 78

Akasztó is a village and municipality in Bács-Kiskun county, in the Southern Great Plain region of southern Hungary. It is surrounded by several areas of the Kiskunság National Park.

== Geography ==
Akasztó covering an area of 64.88 km^{2} lies in the northern edge of the Little Cumania region. Its closest neighbor is Csengőd, about 6 km away.

== History ==
According to local tales, the name of the town comes from the Hungarian word akasztani which means to hang in English. The area was known for its muddy roads that hanged the wheels of a coach. Others says the town was named Akasztó because of its often exercised right to hang people.

Akasztó was first mentioned in 1278 as Akazthow. It was the center of royal tax-collectors. During the Ottoman Conquest it lost much of its population. In the early 18th century Slovak farmers settled in the region. In 1737 the village was the property of the Bosnyák family and in 1770 of the Batthyány family. Before World War II, the local winery and mill industry belonged to Count Mihály Cseszneky de Milvány, but his fortune was nationalised in the Communist-ruled People's Republic of Hungary.
