= Kiskőrös District =

Coordinates: 46.6500°N 19.3333°E

Kiskőrös District Kiskőrösi járás
- Districts of Hungary
- Coat of arms

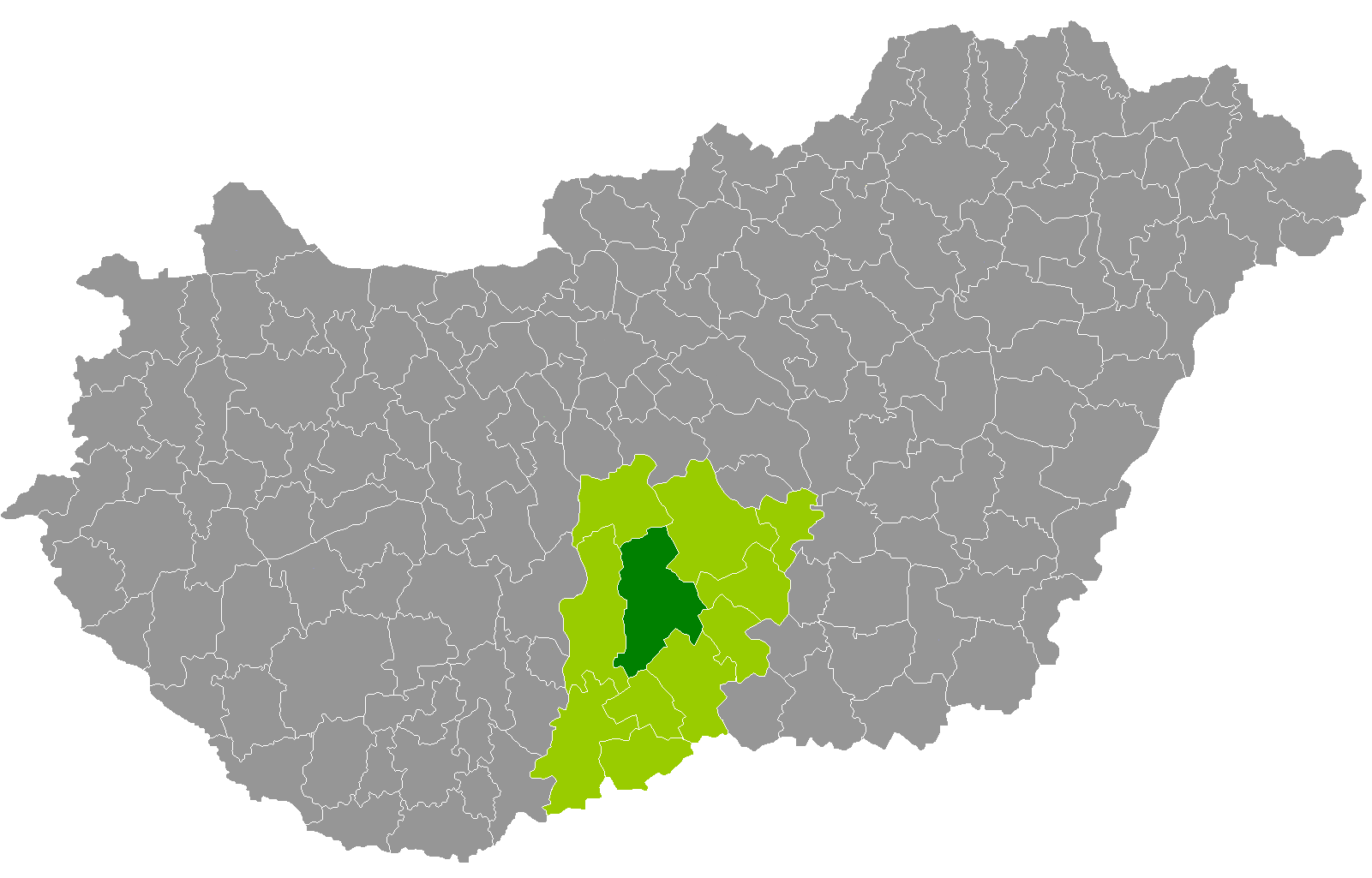
- Kiskőrös District within Hungary and Bács-Kiskun County.
- Country: Hungary
- County: Bács-Kiskun
- District seat: Kiskőrös

Area
  - Total: 1,130.33 km^{2} (436.42 sq mi)
  - Rank: 2nd in Bács-Kiskun

Population (2011 census)
  - Total: 54,625
  - Rank: 3rd in Bács-Kiskun
  - Density: 48/km^{2} (120/sq mi)

Kiskőrös (Hungarian: Kiskőrösi járás) is a district in central part of Bács-Kiskun County. Kiskőrös is also the name of the town where the district seat is found. The district is located in the Southern Great Plain Statistical Region.

== Geography ==
Kiskőrös District borders with Kunszentmiklós District to the north, Kecskemét District to the northeast, Kiskunfélegyháza District and Kiskunmajsa District to the east, Kiskunhalas District to the southeast, Jánoshalma District to the south, Kalocsa District to the west. The number of the inhabited places in Kiskőrös District is 15.

== Municipalities ==
The district has 4 towns and 11 villages. (ordered by population, as of 1 January 2012)

- Akasztó (3,230)
- Bócsa (1,830)
- Császártöltés (2,323)
- Csengőd (2,020)
- Fülöpszállás (2,278)
- Imrehegy (694)
- **Izsák** (5,904)
- Kaskantyú (926)
- **Kecel** (8,687)
- **Kiskőrös** (14,259) – district seat
- Páhi (1,184)
- Soltszentimre (1,261)
- **Soltvadkert** (7,433)
- Tabdi (1,076)
- Tázlár (1,702)

The bolded municipalities are cities.

== Demographics ==
Religion in Kiskőrös District (2011 census)
1. Catholic Church (48.9%)
2. Greek Catholicism (0.20%)
3. Lutheranism (16.1%)
4. Calvinism (8.20%)
5. Other religions (3.20%)
6. Non-religious (6.80%)
7. Atheists (0.50%)
8. Undeclared (16.1%)

In 2011, it had a population of 54,625 and the population density was 48/km^{2}.

Year	County population	Change
2011	54,625	n/a

=== Ethnicity ===
Besides the Hungarian majority, the main minorities are the German (approx. 1,500), Roma (1,400), Slovak (1,200) and Romanian (400).

Total population (2011 census): 54,625
Ethnic groups (2011 census): Identified themselves: 54,640 persons:

- Hungarians: 49,828 (91.19%)
- Germans: 1,524 (2.79%)
- Gypsies: 1,434 (2.62%)
- Slovaks: 1,152 (2.11%)
- Others and indefinable: 702 (1.28%)

Approx. 20 persons in Kiskőrös District did declare more than one ethnic group at the 2011 census.

=== Religion ===
Religious adherence in the county according to 2011 census:

- Catholic – 26,821 (Roman Catholic – 26,734; Greek Catholic – 82);
- Evangelical – 8,789;
- Reformed – 4,473;
- other religions – 1,740;
- Non-religious – 3,716;
- Atheism – 273;
- Undeclared – 8,813.

== Gallery ==
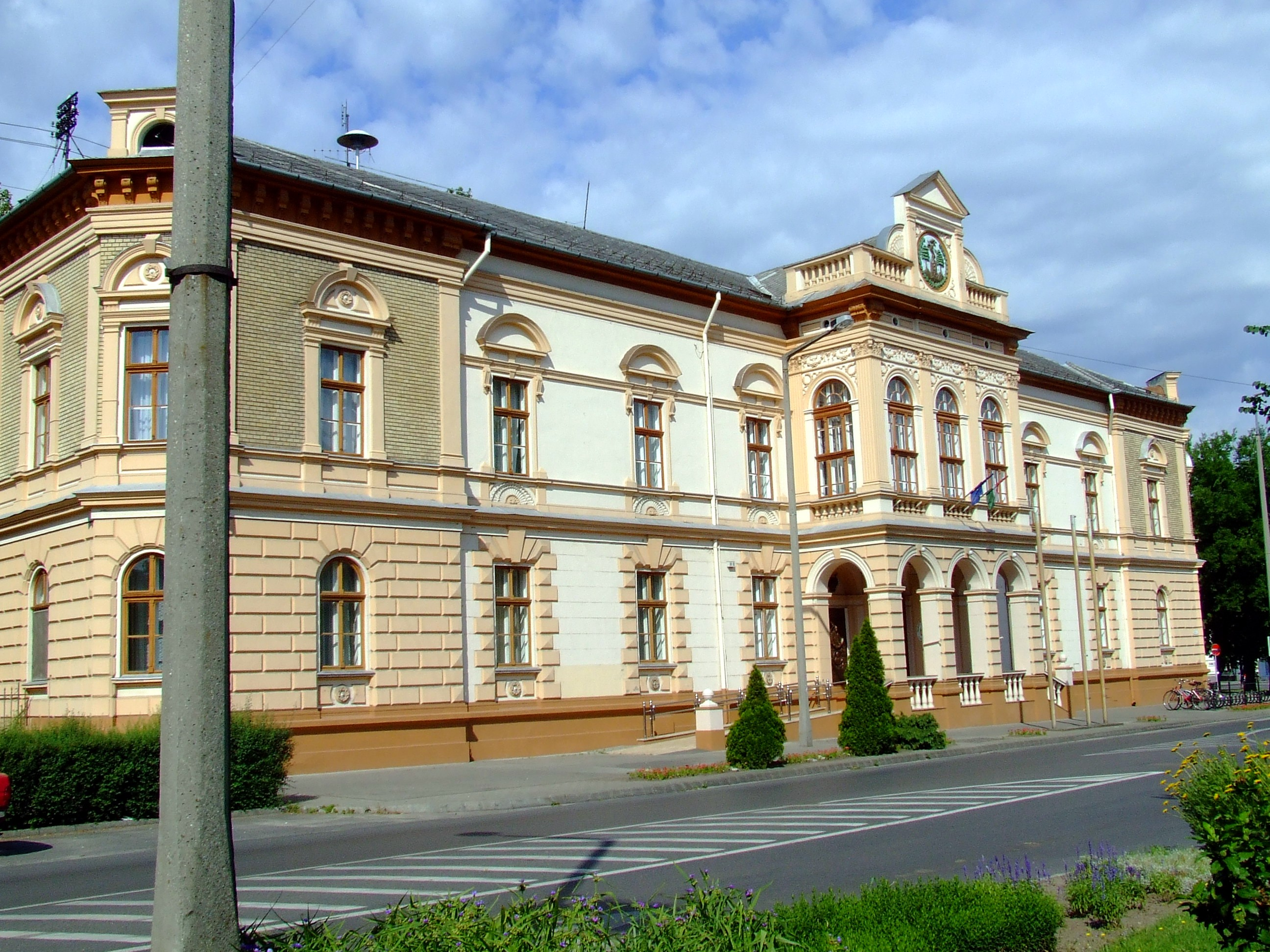
Kiskőrös, Town Hall

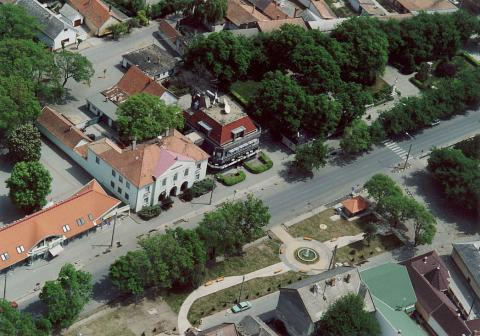
Aerial view of Izsák

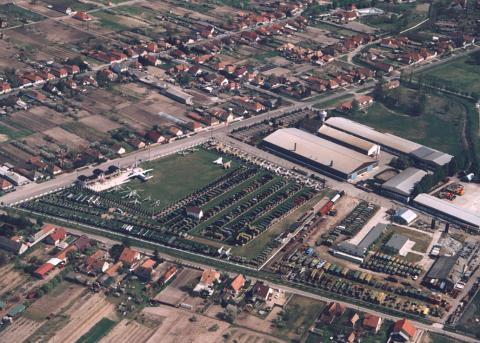
Pintér Works Military Historical Park in Kecel

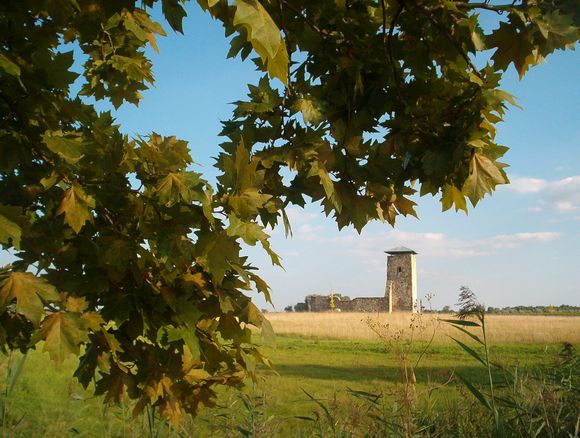
Maimed tower in Soltszentimre

== See also ==
- List of cities and towns of Hungary
