= Kelebija =

Kelebija Келебија (Serbian) Kelebia (Hungarian)
- Village (Selo)
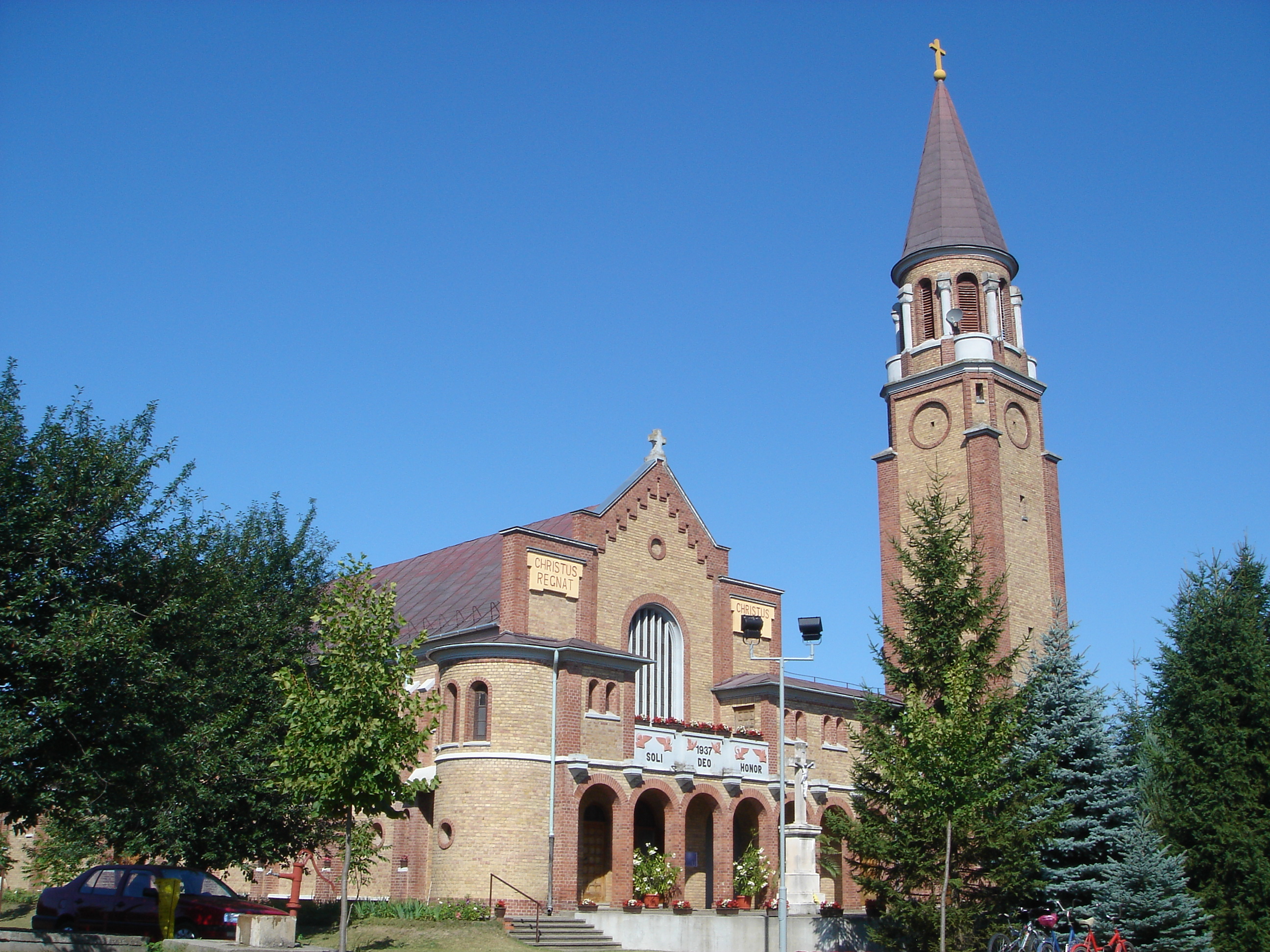
- The Catholic church in Kelebija

- Location of Kelebija within Serbia Kelebija (Serbia) Kelebija (Europe)
- Coordinates: 46.1°N 19.5667°E
- Country: Serbia
- Province: Vojvodina
- District: North Bačka
- Municipality: Subotica

Area
  - Total: 55.89 km^{2} (21.58 sq mi)

Population (2022)
  - Total: 1,969
  - Density: 35.23/km^{2} (91.25/sq mi)
- Time zone: UTC+1 (CET)
  - Summer (DST): UTC+2 (CEST)

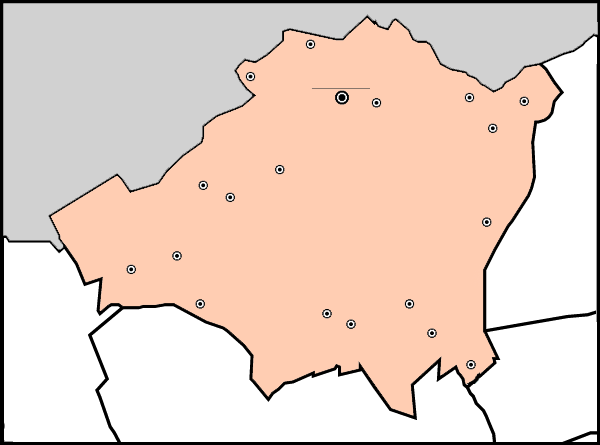

Kelebija (Serbian Cyrillic: Келебија; Hungarian: Kelebia or Alsókelebia) is a village located in the administrative area of the City of Subotica, North Bačka District, Vojvodina, Serbia. As of 2022, it has a population of 1,969 inhabitants.

Kelebija is the northernmost settlement in Serbia, a few hundred meters from the border with Hungary where border crossing is located.

== History ==
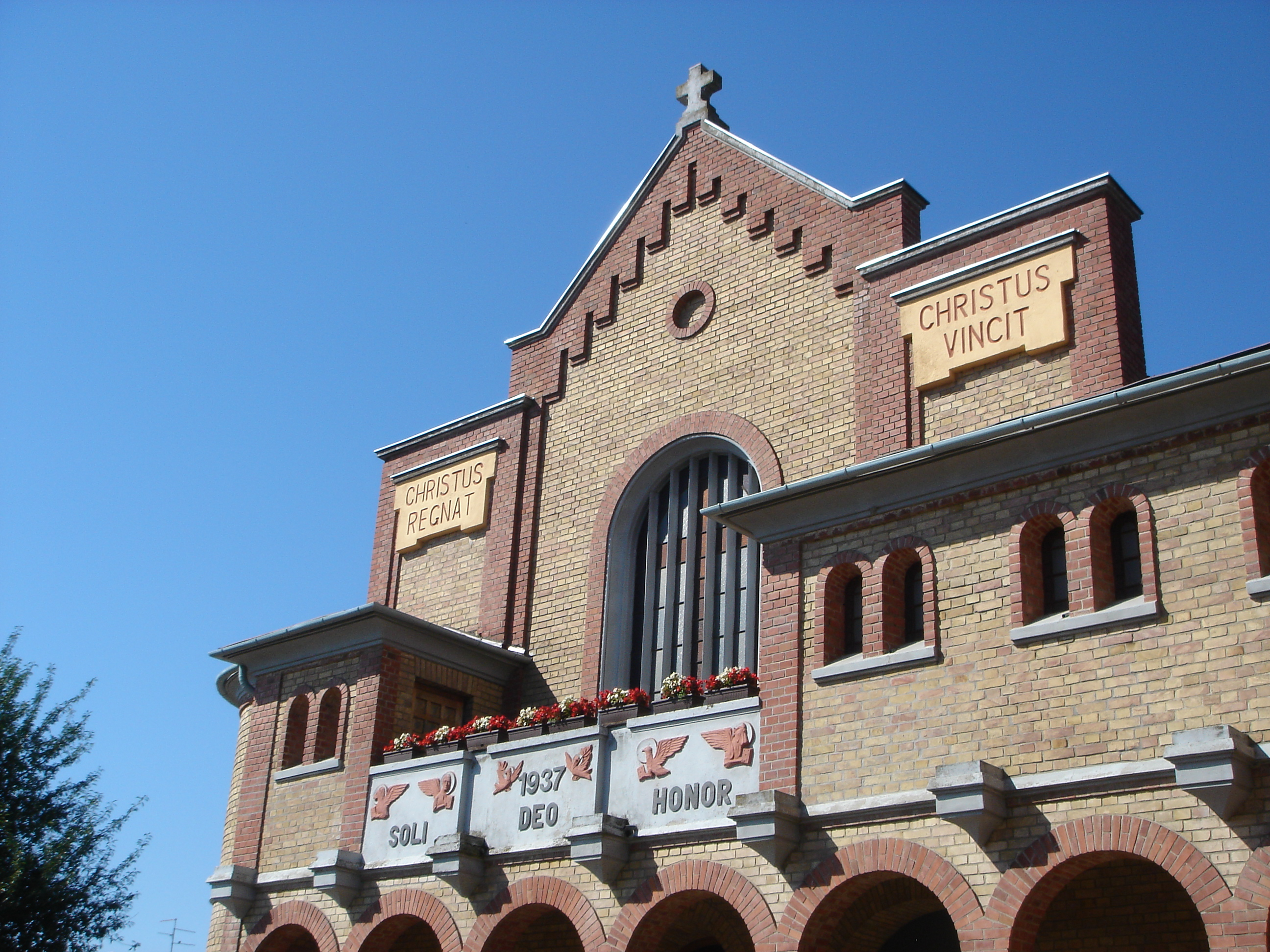
The facade of the Catholic church

There is a small lake at the south-western part of the village, next to which there is a little hill often called "Church Hill" by the local people. Today, however, there is no church in this site, but there are some remnants of a medieval settlement here, among them also the foundations of a larger building, which was probably the church of the medieval settlement called Kalyb.

Kalyb, that is to say, today's Kelebija was mentioned first time in 1297 as the property of Simon Filins Wasa de Kelyb, an aristocrat in the Kingdom of Hungary.

The village became destroyed and depopulated during the Ottoman occupation of the region.

In 1702, the territory of the deserted village (puszta in Hungarian) became attached to Subotica, the largest settlement in the region at that time.

According to a map drawn in 1783, the territory of today's Kelebija was completely intersect by many important roads going out from Subotica towards Baja, Bácsalmás, Tataháza, Mátéháza, Mélykút and Kiskunhalas. Along these roads many people settled forming several rows of houses (houses close to each other). These rows of farmhouses are called sor in Hungarian language, and from the 19th century many of the relatively distant parts of the territory of Kelebia have been called sor with different names: Akasztai sor (Akasztai's row), Belső sor (inside row), Csajkás sor (the row of hard working men), Kertész sor (the row of gardener), Kernyájszky sor (Kernyájszky's row). This latter designation indicates the name of a wealthy man who had several servants living not too far from his villa. This is interesting to note, because Kernyájszky's row of houses is often called also as Szerb sor in Hungarian language, referring probably to the ethnic origin (szerb means Serb) of the inhabitants of this part of Kelebija.

The forming of Kelebija as a proper village took place, actually, in the 20th century, when a monumental Catholic church was built (1937) for the numerous faithful living dispersed in the region. The church served as a meeting point for people and many of them started building their homes around the church, forming thus the center of a proper village.

After World War I, Kelebija became part of the newly formed Kingdom of Serbs, Croat and Slovenes (later Yugoslavia). A part of Kelebija's territory that traditionally belonged to the village remained in Hungary, forming thus a new settlement on the other side of the border, which is called with the same name, but with Hungarian spelling Kelebia. That is why Hungarians often call Kelebija as Alsókelebia, that is to say Lower-Kelebija. Kelebija was ruled again by Hungary between 1941 and 1944 during World War II.

In 1978, the border crossing between Yugoslavia and Hungary was open, putting thus to end the relative isolation of the village from the rest of the world.

== Demographics ==
=== Historical population ===
- 1961: 2,974
- 1971: 2,434
- 1981: 1,995
- 1991: 1,975
- 2002: 2,168
- 2011: 2,132
- 2022: 1,969

=== Ethnic groups ===
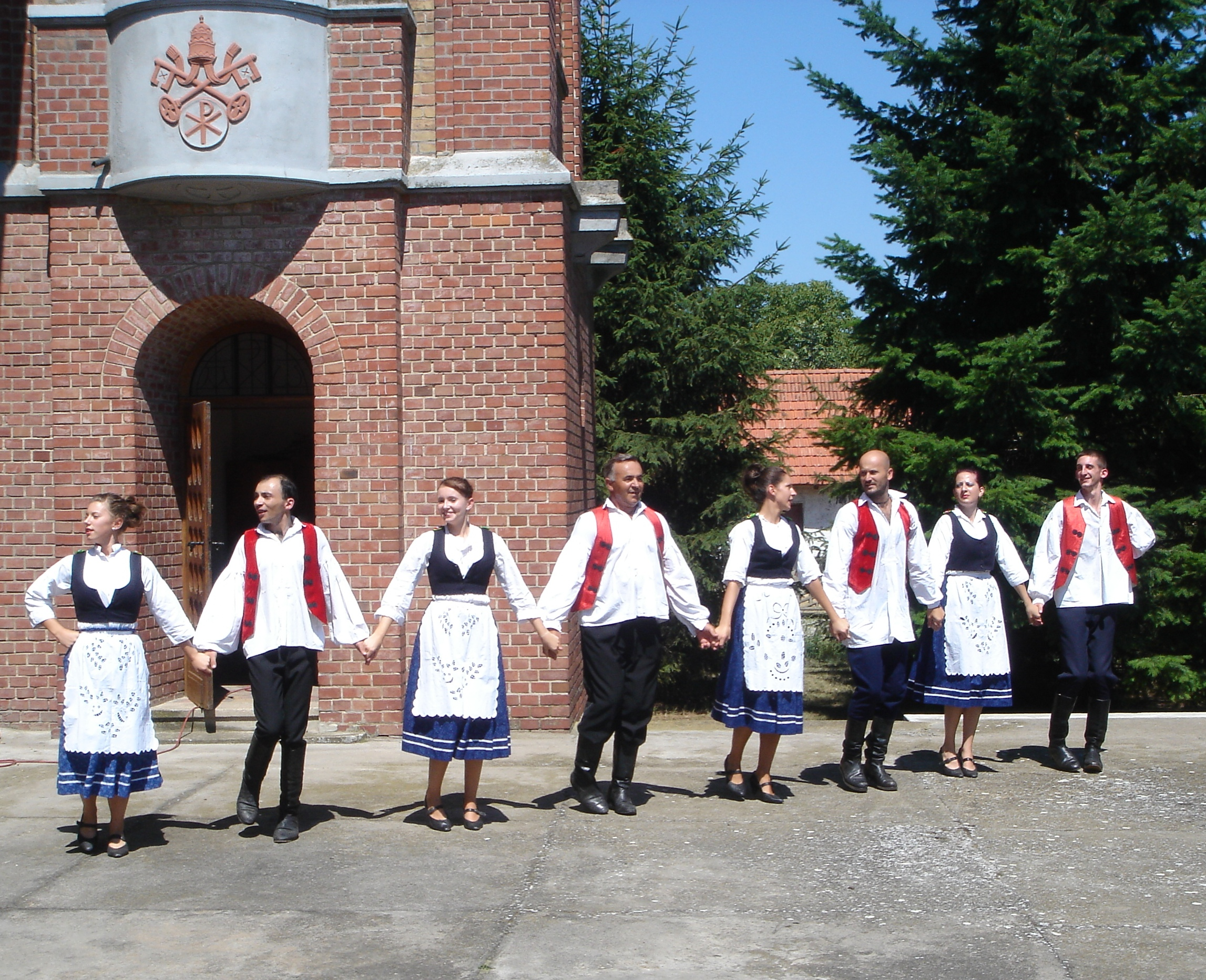
Hungarian dancers in front of the Catholic church

=== Ethnic groups ===
According to data from the 2022 census, ethnic groups in the village include:

- 1,010 (51.3%) Hungarians
- 380 (19.3%) Serbs
- 110 (5.6%) Bunjevci
- 59 (3%) Croats
- Others/Undeclared/Unknown

== See also ==
- List of places in Serbia
- List of cities, towns and villages in Vojvodina
