= Kaskantyú =

Village in Bács-Kiskun, Hungary

- Flag Coat of arms

- Location within Bács-Kiskun County Location within Hungary Location within Europe
- Coordinates: 46°40′20″N 19°23′14″E
- Country: Hungary
- County: Bács-Kiskun
- District: Kiskőrös

Area
  - Total: 58.28 km^{2} (22.50 sq mi)

Population (2015)
  - Total: 1,002
  - Density: 17.2/km^{2} (45/sq mi)
- Time zone: UTC+1 (CET)
  - Summer (DST): UTC+2 (CEST)
- Postal code: 6211
- Area code: 78

Kaskantyú is a village in Bács-Kiskun county, in the Southern Great Plain region of Hungary.

== Etymology ==
The name is of Cuman origin. It comes from "qaçqınçıɣ", which means "like a fugitive".

== Geography ==
It covers an area of 58.28 km^{2} (23 sq mi) and has a population of 1002 people as of 2015.
