= Halas lace =

Hungarian needle lace

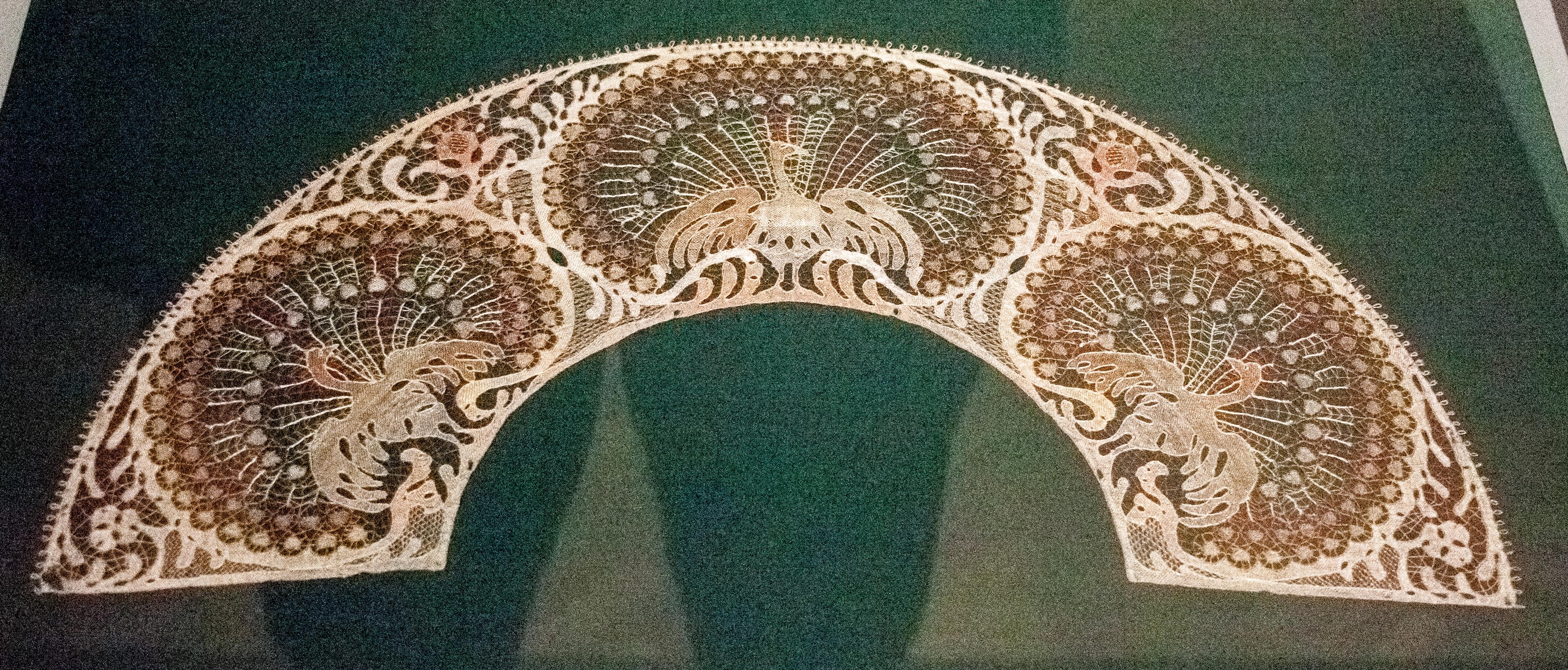
Halas lace panel for a fan, designed by Árpád Dékáni (1861–1931) and made by Mária Markovits, Kiskunhalas Lace Manufactory, ca. 1906

Halas lace is a type of needle lace. It first appeared in 1902 in the town of Kiskunhalas, Hungary, colloquially known as "Halas". Invention of the lace style is attributed to designer Arpád Dékáni. The lace was typically soft orange, pale green and yellow in colouring. Árpád Dékáni and Mária Markovits are credited with developing Halas lace. Initially, Dékáni did all of the design work while Markovits executed the designs, using silk thread.
