= Katalin Karsai-Juhász =

Hungarian politician

Member of the National Assembly
- Assuming office 9 May 2026
- Succeeding: Gábor Bányai
- Constituency: Bács-Kiskun 5th

Personal details
- Party: Tisza

Katalin Karsai-Juhász is a Hungarian politician who was elected member of the National Assembly in 2026 representing the Bács-Kiskun County 5th constituency. She previously worked as a teacher.
