= Jobbik Young Section =

Jobbik Young Section Jobbik Ifjúsági Tagozat
- Leader: Gergő Keresztesy
- Vice President: Rajmund Baucsek; Krisztina Koczka; Gergő Salamon; Márk Sándor; Dénes Szarka
- Founded: 2011
- Headquarters: 1113 Budapest, Villányi út 20/A
- Ideology: Conservatism; Hungarian nationalism
- Colours: red-silver
- Mother party: Jobbik
- Website: www.jobbikit.hu

Jobbik Young Section (Hungarian: Jobbik Ifjúsági Tagozat, abbreviated to Jobbik IT) is the youth organisation of the Jobbik in Hungary. The organisation was founded in 2011. Motto: The future is ours!

== History ==
=== Formation ===
At the first convention on 2013 the members of the young section elected Gergely Farkas for president of Jobbik Young Section. He was the president between 2013 and 2019. In 2019 the members elected Gergő Keresztessy for president of youth organisation.
