= Kunfehértó =

Coordinates: 46°21′32″N 19°24′58″E

- Flag Coat of arms
- Interactive map of Kunfehértó
- Country: Hungary
- County: Bács-Kiskun

Area
  - Total: 78.37 km^{2} (30.26 sq mi)

Population (2005)
  - Total: 2,307
  - Density: 29/km^{2} (75/sq mi)
- Time zone: UTC+1 (CET)
  - Summer (DST): UTC+2 (CEST)
- Postal code: 641
- Area code: 77

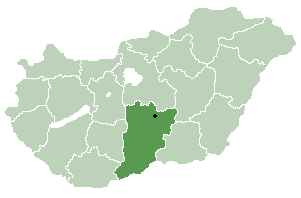
Location of Bács-Kiskun county in Hungary

Kunfehértó is a village in Bács-Kiskun county, in the Southern Great Plain region of Hungary. In near the village there is a holiday village. Due to its small size, there is only one main road to enter the village. By following this about 2 km through the village, one will arrive at the other end where several new homes have been built the last years. A few hundred metres further one will come to an area of summer holiday cottages. Here one will also find a small lake, which in Hungarian is called tó.

Many people in the village makes a living from farming, hand craft or other entrepreneurial businesses, while knowledge intensive occupations such as doctors and lawyers are more typical in the bigger villages or cities.

Croats in Hungary call this village Fertov and Vertov.

== History ==
It was not before 1948 that the idea of building the village came up. Before this there was only an elementary school and the train station for the people living in the area. The location where the village is situated today was basically made up of puszta and grazing fields. In 1950 the area was measured into land lot(s), and it was on these parcels of land that the village was built. In 1951 the name Bácsfehértó was given to the village, but this was changed to Kunfehértó in 1952, the same year as electricity was integrated in the village. In the first period, between 1950 and 1953, around 180-190 homes were built. In the following years public buildings such as the town hall, kinder garden and post office were built.

The area around the lake with all the summer cottages was until recently a popular summer holiday destination for many German, Dutch and Austrian tourists, but the last ten years, after the increasing popularity of Lake Balaton and other bigger places in Hungary, these visitors are almost absent today. Still, the yearly beer festival with its concerts, parties and entertainment attracts a great number of visitors from all over the county and Hungary. Also, every summer many children spends a week or two in summer camps or at the sports facilities near the lake.

== Geography ==
It covers an area of 78.37 km^{2} (30 sq mi) and has a population of 2307 people (2005). The village is located between the two cities Kiskunhalas and Jánoshalma, about 50 km from the Serbian border.
