= Csengőd =

- Coat of arms

- Location within Hungary
- Coordinates: 46°43′N 19°16′E
- Country: Hungary
- County: Bács-Kiskun
- District: Kiskőrös

Area
  - Total: 48.89 km^{2} (18.88 sq mi)

Population (2005)
  - Total: 2,335
  - Density: 47.76/km^{2} (123.7/sq mi)
- Time zone: UTC+1 (CET)
  - Summer (DST): UTC+2 (CEST)
- Postal code: 6222
- Area code: 78

Csengőd is a village in Bács-Kiskun County, in the Southern Great Plain region of Hungary.

Croats in Hungary call this village as Čengid.

== Geography ==
It covers an area of 48.89 km^{2} (19 sq mi) and has a population of 2335 people (2005).
