= Zsana =

Village in Hungary

- Flag Coat of arms

- Location of Zsana Zsana (Hungary) Zsana (Europe)
- Coordinates: 46°25′N 19°41′E
- Country: Hungary
- County: Bács-Kiskun
- District: Kiskunhalas

Area
  - Total: 87.94 km^{2} (33.95 sq mi)

Population (2002)
  - Total: 875
  - Density: 10/km^{2} (26/sq mi)
- Time zone: UTC+1 (CET)
  - Summer (DST): UTC+2 (CEST)
- Postal code: 6411
- Area code: 77

Zsana is a village in Bács-Kiskun county, in the Southern Great Plain region of southern Hungary.

== Geography ==
It covers an area of 87.94 km^{2} (34 sq mi) and had a population of 875 people in 2002.

== History ==
On January 24, 1979, a major gas pipeline eruption occurred, known as the 1979 Zsana gas eruption, that took weeks to extinguish.
