= Pirtó =

Coordinates: 46°31′N 19°26′E

- Interactive map of Pirtó
- Country: Hungary
- County: Bács-Kiskun

Area
  - Total: 34.49 km^{2} (13.32 sq mi)

Population (2002)
  - Total: 992
  - Density: 29/km^{2} (75/sq mi)
- Time zone: UTC+1 (CET)
  - Summer (DST): UTC+2 (CEST)
- Postal code: 6414
- Area code: 77

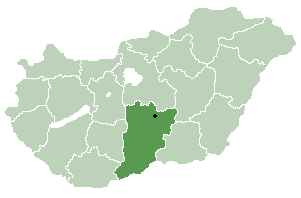
Location of Bács-Kiskun county in Hungary

Pirtó is a village in Bács-Kiskun county, in the Southern Great Plain region of southern Hungary.

Croats in Hungary call this village Pirtov.

The village is known for its natural protected area with Juniper Shrubs, the Kiffer pear and its yearly tradition of 'Buckajárás'.

== History ==
According to archeological finds, the area was already inhabited in the Migration Period. Under the reign of the Árpád dynasty Cumans settled here. In the 16th century the region fell under Ottoman control and since then shared the fate of Kiskunhalas town. After the expulsion of Turks Pirtó became a pasture field shared by Kiskunhalas and the Counts Cseszneky de Milvány. By the 19th century, an extended network of isolated farms characterized the Pirtó area which was still administered by the council of Kiskunhalas. Pirtó as an independent village was founded only in 1947.

== Geography ==
It covers an area of 34.49 km^{2} (13 sq mi) and has a population of 1009 people (2006). It is located right on the 53rd main road, and on the Budapest-Kelebia railway line. The village's constant development is helped by its great location.
