= Tompa =

- Town
- Flag Coat of arms

- Location within Hungary
- Coordinates: 46.20491°N 19.54740°E
- Country: Hungary
- County: Bács-Kiskun
- District: Kiskunhalas

Area
  - Total: 81.57 km^{2} (31.49 sq mi)

Population (2023)
  - Total: 3,966
  - Density: 48.62/km^{2} (125.9/sq mi)
- Time zone: UTC+1 (CET)
  - Summer (DST): UTC+2 (CEST)
- Postal code: 6422
- Area code: (+36) 77
- Website: www.tompa.hu

Tompa is a town in Bács-Kiskun county, Hungary.

The Tompa Block is composed of recomplete Miocene shale and has been an area of hydrocarbon exploration. As of April 2009 a well drilled by Toreador has produced natural gas. Design of a Hydraulic fracturing program to stimulate the well was finalized and operations to perform the treatment, were to start in May 2009.

Also, Cuadrilla Resources lists Tompa in their prospectus. In Tompa 38,796 acres composed of recomplete Miocene were described to contain multi TCF Basin Centred TGS.
