= Gábor Bányai =

Hungarian politician

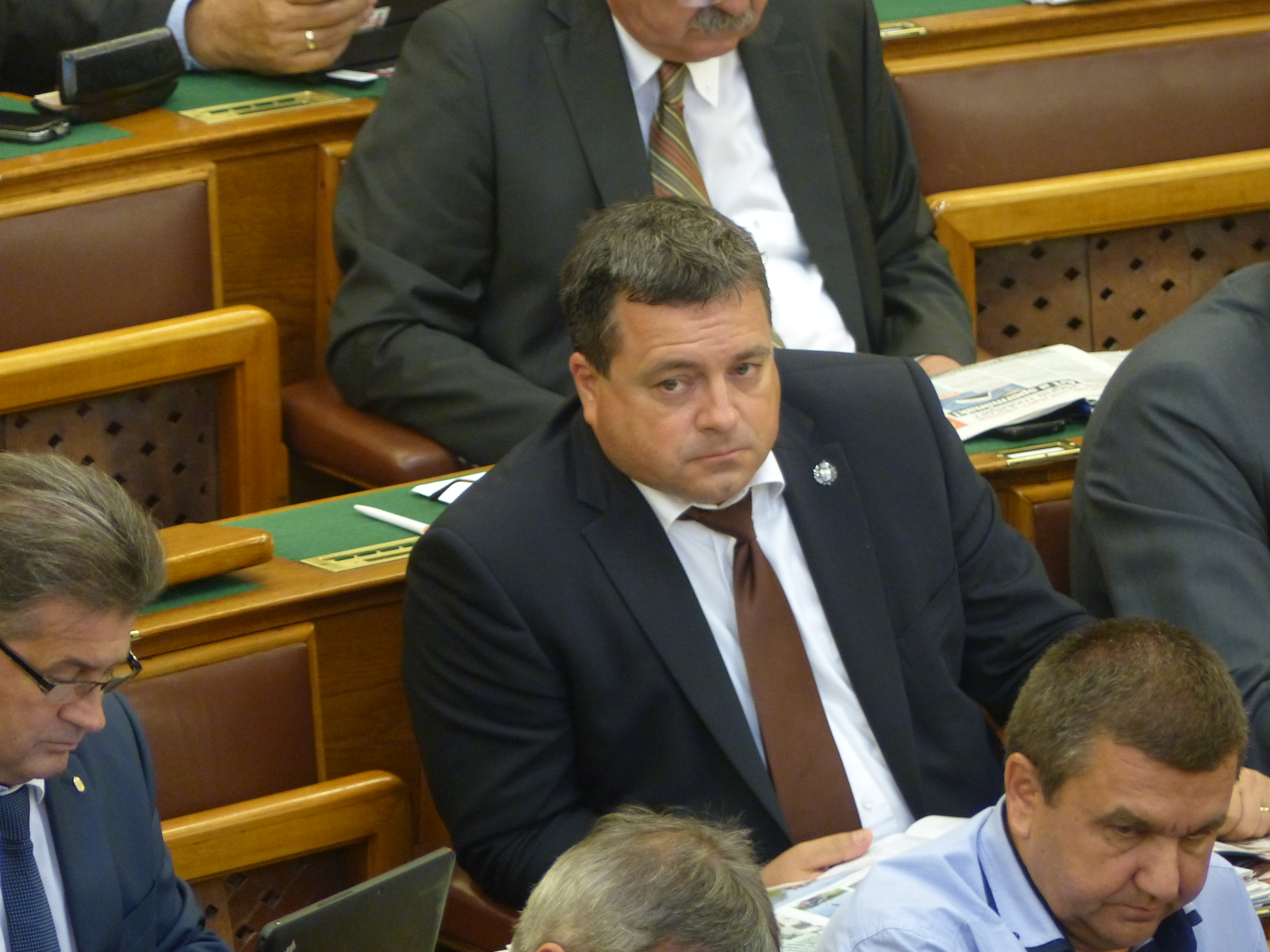

Member of the National Assembly
- In office 16 May 2006 – 8 May 2026

Personal details
- Born: 27 August 1969 (age 56) Budapest, Hungary
- Party: Fidesz
- Spouse: Krisztina Bányainé Móricz
- Children: Eszter; Áron; Krisztina; Gábor; Anna
- Profession: politician

Gábor Bányai (born 27 August 1969) is a Hungarian politician, who was a member of the National Assembly (MP) for Bácsalmás, Bács-Kiskun County from 2006 to 2014, later for Kiskunhalas from 2014 to 2026. He was a member of the Committee on Sustainable Development since 14 May 2010. He was appointed vice-chairman of the Enterprise Development Committee in May 2014.

He served as President of the General Assembly of Bács-Kiskun County from 2006 to 2014. Minister Tibor Navracsics appointed him government commissioner responsible for the economic development of the Southern Great Plain in May 2022. Bányai was defeated by Tisza candidate Katalin Karsai-Juhász in the 2026 Hungarian parliamentary election, thus he did not secure a mandate after 20 years.

== Personal life ==
He is married. His wife is Krisztina Bányainé Móricz. They have five children - three daughters, Eszter, Krisztina and Anna and two sons, Áron and Gábor.
