= Imrehegy =

Village in Bács-Kiskun County, Hungary

- Flag Coat of arms

- Location of Imrehegy Imrehegy (Hungary) Imrehegy (Europe)
- Coordinates: 46°29′N 19°19′E
- Country: Hungary
- County: Bács-Kiskun
- District: Kiskőrös

Area
  - Total: 70.31 km^{2} (27.15 sq mi)

Population (2002)
  - Total: 845
  - Density: 12/km^{2} (31/sq mi)
- Time zone: UTC+1 (CET)
  - Summer (DST): UTC+2 (CEST)
- Postal code: 6238
- Area code: 78

Imrehegy (Croatian: Delavnjača) is a village in Bács-Kiskun County, in the Southern Great Plain region of southern Hungary.

== Geography and demographics ==
It covers an area of 70.31 km^{2} (27 sq mi) and had a population of 845 people in 2002.
