= Tázlár =

Coordinates: 46°33′N 19°31′E

- Flag Seal
- Interactive map of Tázlár
- Country: Hungary
- County: Bács-Kiskun

Area
  - Total: 7,338 km^{2} (2,833 sq mi)

Population (2021)
  - Total: 1,785
  - Density: 24.57/km^{2} (63.6/sq mi)
- Time zone: UTC+1 (CET)
  - Summer (DST): UTC+2 (CEST)
- Postal code: 6236
- Area code: 78

Tázlár is a village and municipality in Bács-Kiskun county, in the Southern Great Plain region of southern Hungary. It is about 10 km away from its closest neighbor, Soltvadkert.

== Geography ==
Tázlár is situated in flat grasslands, in southern Kiskunság (part of the Great Hungarian plains).

== History ==
There was a village in the place of Tázlár in the age of the Árpád dynasty, though not much is known about the settlement. In the Mongol invasion of Hungary of 1241–1242, people of the town fortified a stone church, but they were ultimately slain by the invaders and the village was burnt down. The king later repopulated the area with Cumans. The village's current name is from a certificate dating back to 1429, which has Cuman origins too.

The medieval village was later destroyed; it was in the hands of various landlords, who spilt their lands up to give to peasants, to work their lands.

In 1872, the neighbouring settlements of Kisbócsa, Nagybócsa, Kötöny and Harka merged to form a new village, also named Tázlár. Bócsa separated in 1906 and Harkakötöny in 1949, each becoming an independent settlement.

Tázlár's name was changed to Prónayfalva in 1907, but since 1947 it's called Tázlár again. The village was studied in the 1970s by anthropologist Chris Hann, resulting in a book "Tázlár: A village in Hungary". He has returned there in 2000s studying the further developments The New Property System in Tázlár

== Demographics ==
=== Ethnicity ===
As of the census of 2001 there were 2,014 people living in Tázlár. The ethnical background of the town was 95.1% Hungarian, 0.7% Gypsy, 0.2% Slovak, 4.5% other.

=== Religion ===
The religious affiliations of the people of Tázlár are:

- Roman Catholic - 65.9%
- Presbyterian - 16.1%
- Lutheran - 6.5%
- Other Christian - 0.9%
- Non-Religious - 10.5%
