= Balotaszállás =

Village in Bács-Kiskun, Hungary

- Flag Coat of arms

- Location of Balotaszállás Balotaszállás (Hungary) Balotaszállás (Europe)
- Coordinates: 46°21′N 19°32′E
- Country: Hungary
- County: Bács-Kiskun
- District: Kiskunhalas

Area
  - Total: 104.94 km^{2} (40.52 sq mi)

Population (2005)
  - Total: 1,657
  - Density: 15.78/km^{2} (40.9/sq mi)
- Time zone: UTC+1 (CET)
  - Summer (DST): UTC+2 (CEST)
- Postal code: 6412
- Area code: 77

Balotaszállás (Croatian: Blato) is a village in Bács-Kiskun county, in the Southern Great Plain region of southern Hungary.

== Geography ==
It covers an area of 104.94 km^{2} (41 sq mi) and had a population of 1657 people in 2005.
