= Kecel =

- Town
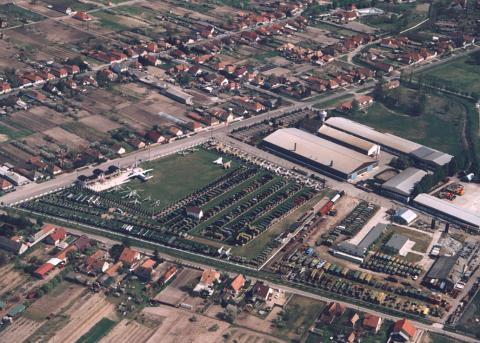
- Aerial view of the town and military park

- Flag Coat of arms

- Location of Kecel
- Coordinates: 46.533°N 19.25°E
- Country: Hungary
- County: Bács-Kiskun
- District: Kiskőrös

Area
  - Total: 114.48 km^{2} (44.20 sq mi)

Population (2008)
  - Total: 8,892
  - Density: 78.42/km^{2} (203.1/sq mi)
- Time zone: UTC+1 (CET)
  - Summer (DST): UTC+2 (CEST)
- Postal code: 6237
- Area code: (+36) 78
- Website: kecel.hu

Kecel is a town in Bács-Kiskun county, in southern Hungary.

Croats in Hungary call this town Kecelj.

== History ==
The first documents mentioning Kecel date back to 1198. Like many other Hungarian towns, Kecel has lost its population during the Turkish Conquest. On April 22, 1734 Gábor Patachich, the bishop of Kalocsa issued papers reestablishing the town of Kecel. At the time, most people made their living by herding. However, the rising population made this extremely hard, so people committed themselves to farming which still remains the main industry in Kecel. In 1802 a number of new buildings were built including: the Roman Catholic church, the Town Hall, the first school, post office, and the police and fire stations. The railroad also reached Kecel. Kecel received town rights in 1993.

The town was served by the Kiskőrös–Kalocsa railway line, operated by MÁV, until its closure in 2007.

The Pintér Művek Military Museum and Park (Hungarian: Pintér Művek Haditechnikai Park), which houses a large collection of military equipment and vehicles, is located on the outskirts of the town in the territory of a metal works factory of the same name.

== Demographics ==
As of the census of 2001, there were 9,259 people and 3,600 households.

== Twin towns – sister cities ==
Kecel is twinned with:

- Schwarzenbruck, Germany (1991)
- Lupeni, Romania (2009)
