= Harkakötöny =

Village in Hungary

- Flag Coat of arms

- Location of Harkakötöny Harkakötöny (Hungary) Harkakötöny (Europe)
- Coordinates: 46°27′N 19°36′E
- Country: Hungary
- County: Bács-Kiskun
- District: Kiskunhalas

Area
  - Total: 52.70 km^{2} (20.35 sq mi)

Population (2024)
  - Total: 707
  - Density: 19/km^{2} (49/sq mi)
- Time zone: UTC+1 (CET)
  - Summer (DST): UTC+2 (CEST)
- Postal code: 6136
- Area code: 77

Harkakötöny (Croatian: Kotinj) is a village in Bács-Kiskun county, in the Southern Great Plain region of southern Hungary.

== Geography ==
It covers an area of 52.7 km^{2} (20 sq mi) and has a population of 707 people as of 2024.

== Points of interest ==
Until 2016 at 46.462834 N 19.600232 E a unique water tower existed, which consisted of a steel lattice tower supporting a steel tube tower with a chalice-shaped tank, guyed to the ground . This unique water tower was demolished in 2016 after a new water tower of conventional design was erected nearby.
