= Kisszállás =

Coordinates: 46°16.786′N 19°29.475′E

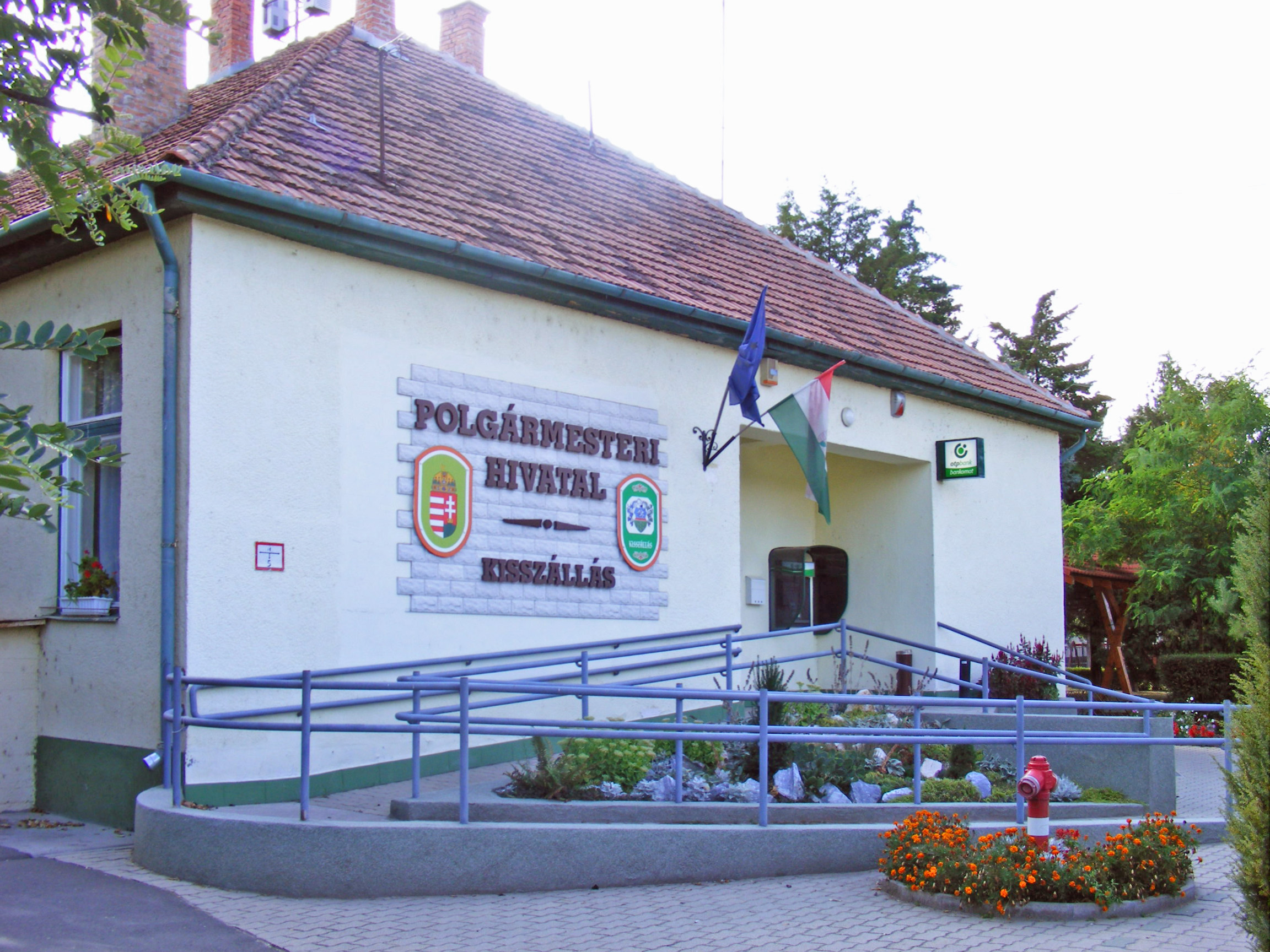
- Town hall
- Interactive map of Kisszállás
- Country: Hungary
- County: Bács-Kiskun

Area
  - Total: 92.06 km^{2} (35.54 sq mi)

Population (2002)
  - Total: 2,878
  - Density: 31/km^{2} (80/sq mi)
- Time zone: UTC+1 (CET)
  - Summer (DST): UTC+2 (CEST)
- Postal code: 6421
- Area code: 77

Kisszállás is a village and municipality in Bács-Kiskun county, in the Southern Great Plain region of southern Hungary.

Croats in Hungary call this village Salašica.

== Geography ==
It covers an area of 92.06 km^{2} (36 sq mi) and has a population of 2878 people (2005).

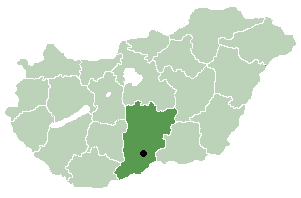

- Kisszállás in Google Maps
- More info in Hungarian Wiki

== History ==
The area has long been settlement for different nations. Avars, Kuns and even Turkish people have lived there for centuries and left their footsteps there. A Turkish and an Avar cemetery have been discovered in Kisszállás proving this.

The Hungarian village was founded by the unification of 7 other small villages in the middle of the 19th century. Since then, its citizens have made there living by using the great topsoil for agricultural purposes.

Now, approximately 2,800 people live in the village. The common religion is Roman Catholic and most people are still make their living in the field of agriculture.

The name of the settlement: 'Kisszállás' in Hungarian is a compound word. The first part of the name (Kis-) means small, and the second part (-szállás) is a common Hungarian settlement ending like '-ville' in American. So, technically Kisszállás is the Hungarian Smallville.

== Sources ==
- Kisszállás information portal (Halasregio.hu)
- Kisszállás in Bács-Kiskun area portal (bacsportal.hu)
- Kisszállás map (Terkepcentrum.hu)
- Hungarian National and History Symbols
