= Kelebia =

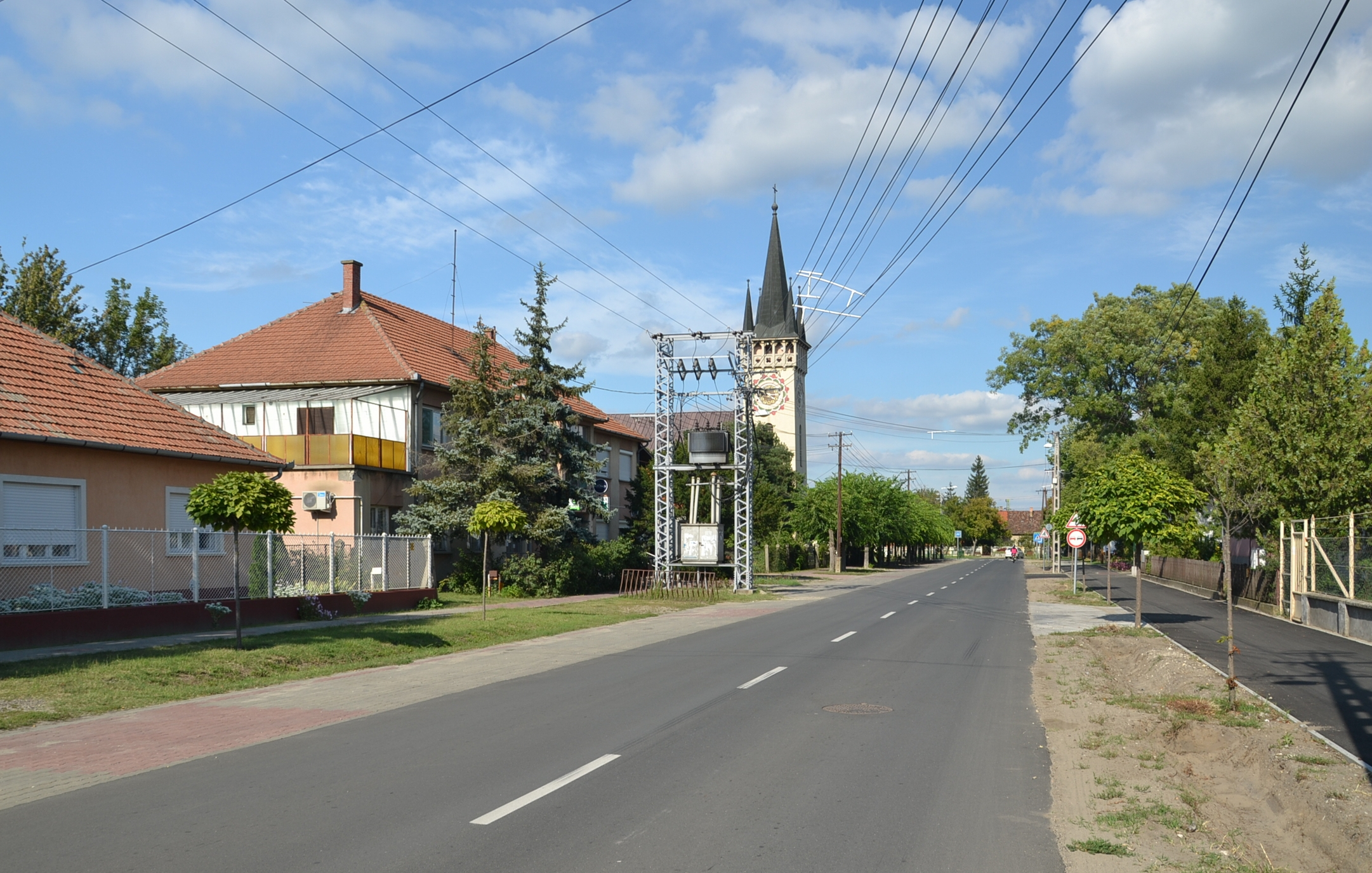
- Kelebia with the Church of Christ the King

- Coat of arms

- Location in Hungary
- Coordinates: 46°12′N 19°37′E
- Country: Hungary
- County: Bács-Kiskun

Area
  - Total: 66.70 km^{2} (25.75 sq mi)

Population (2002)
  - Total: 3,019
  - Density: 45/km^{2} (120/sq mi)
- Time zone: UTC+1 (CET)
  - Summer (DST): UTC+2 (CEST)
- Postal code: 6423
- Area code: 77

Kelebia is a village in Bács-Kiskun county, in the Southern Great Plain region of southern Hungary. The railway crossing into the Serbian province of Vojvodina is located here.

Croats in Hungary call this village Kelebija.

== History ==
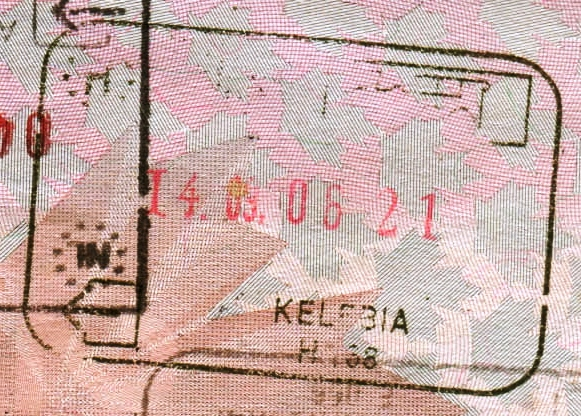
Passport exit stamp from Kelebia via railway crossing.

The border drawn in 1918 split one village into two countries, Hungary and Kingdom of Serbs, Croats and Slovenes. Today, the municipalities are called Kelebia in Hungary and Kelebija in Serbia.

== Geography ==
It covers an area of 66.7 km^{2} (26 sq mi) and has a population of 2647 people (2026).
