= Kiskunhalas =

- Town
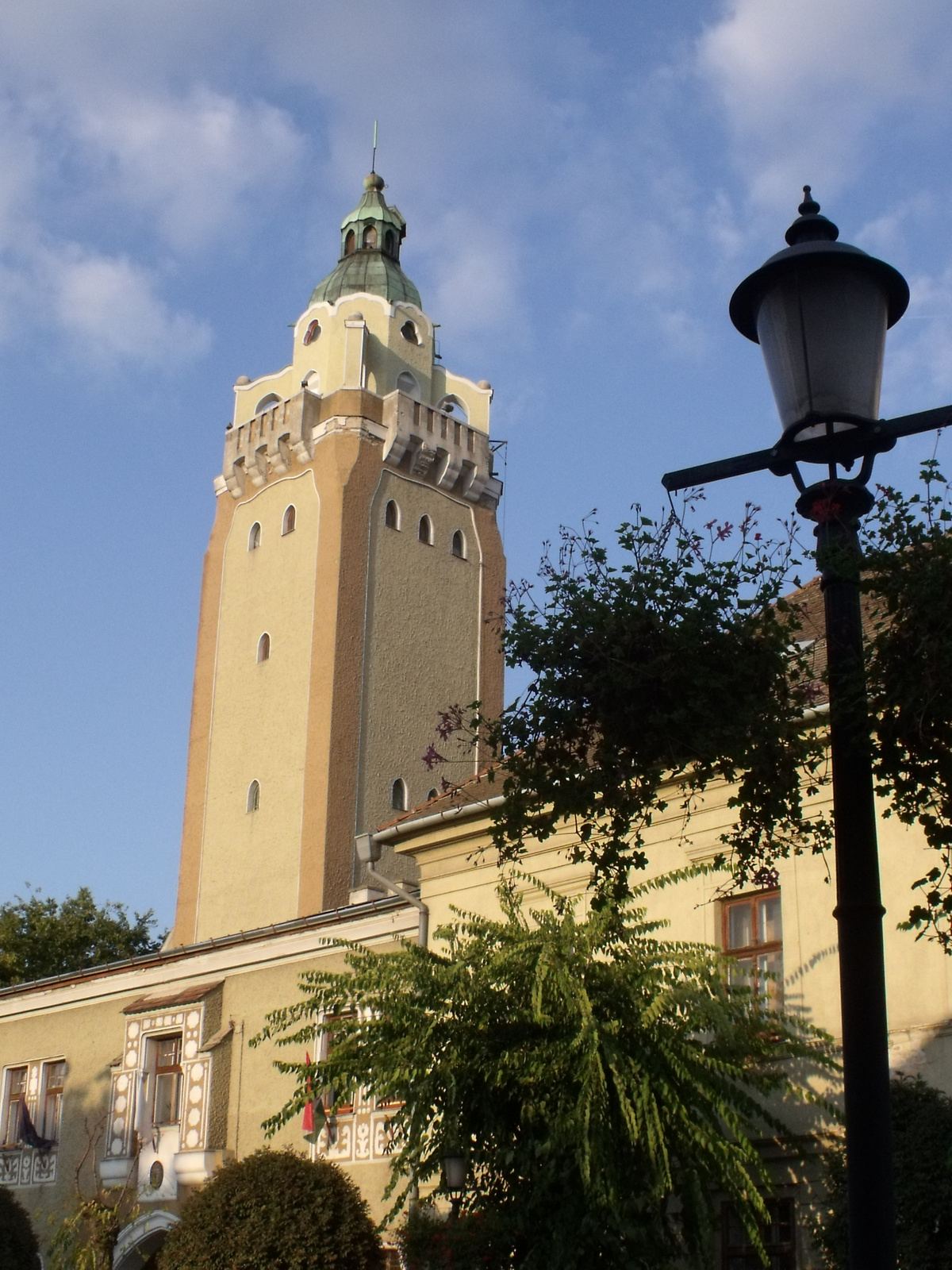
- The Tower of the Town Hall

- Flag Coat of arms
- Motto(s): "Halas, hatalmas"
- Location of Kiskunhalas Kiskunhalas (Europe)
- Coordinates: 46.43201°N 19.48850°E
- Country: Hungary
- County: Bács-Kiskun
- District: Kiskunhalas

Government
  - Mayor: Róbert Fülöp

Area
  - Total: 227.58 km^{2} (87.87 sq mi)

Population (2023)
  - Total: 26,584
  - Density: 120.7/km^{2} (313/sq mi)
- Time zone: UTC+1 (CET)
  - Summer (DST): UTC+2 (CEST)
- Postal code: 6400
- Area code: (+36) 77
- Website: www.kiskunhalas.hu

Kiskunhalas (Hungarian pronunciation: [ˈkiʃkunhɒlɒʃ]; German: Hallasch) is a city in the county of Bács-Kiskun, Hungary.

== Railroad ==
The city is an important railway junction. It crosses the Budapest-Subotica-Belgrade railway line. The Kiskunfélegyháza railway ends in Kiskunhalas.

== Geography ==
Kiskunhalas is located 130 km (81 mi) south of Budapest. On 20 July 2007, Kiskunhalas recorded a temperature of 41.9 °C (107.4 °F), which is the highest temperature to have ever been recorded in Hungary.

== Name ==
Kiskunhalas used to be surrounded by lakes that were rich in fish, Halas in Hungarian, and this gave rise to the town's name. The other part of the name comes from the Hungarian kiskun-, meaning Little Cumania (Hungarian: Kiskunság); Kun was what the Hungarians called the Cuman people.

Croats in Hungary call this town as Olaš. The Croat name came as shortening of its Hungarian name, as it was easier for Croat speakers to pronounce it that way.

== History ==
Its known history goes back to the 9th century. Kiskunhalas has many archaeological artifacts. These are displayed in the János Thorma Museum, established in honor of an early 20th-century painter who was born and grew up here.

Several villages were known to have been in the area from 895. The place became significant when the Cumans arrived. Its name is derived from the Hungarian word, Kun, for the Cumans. The first written documents mentioning Halas date to 1347.

After 1596, the town lost much of its population due to warfare during the Ottoman invasion and plague.

In the 16th and 17th centuries, Kiskunhalas welcomed the Protestant Reformation. Until 1754 the city was the center of the region, but after that, its significance declined under Catholic rulers because of the local people's support for Protestantism. A Roman Catholic church was built in 1770. A new Reformed (now called Presbyterian) church was built in 1823.

In 1910 the population reached 25,000.

== Gallery ==
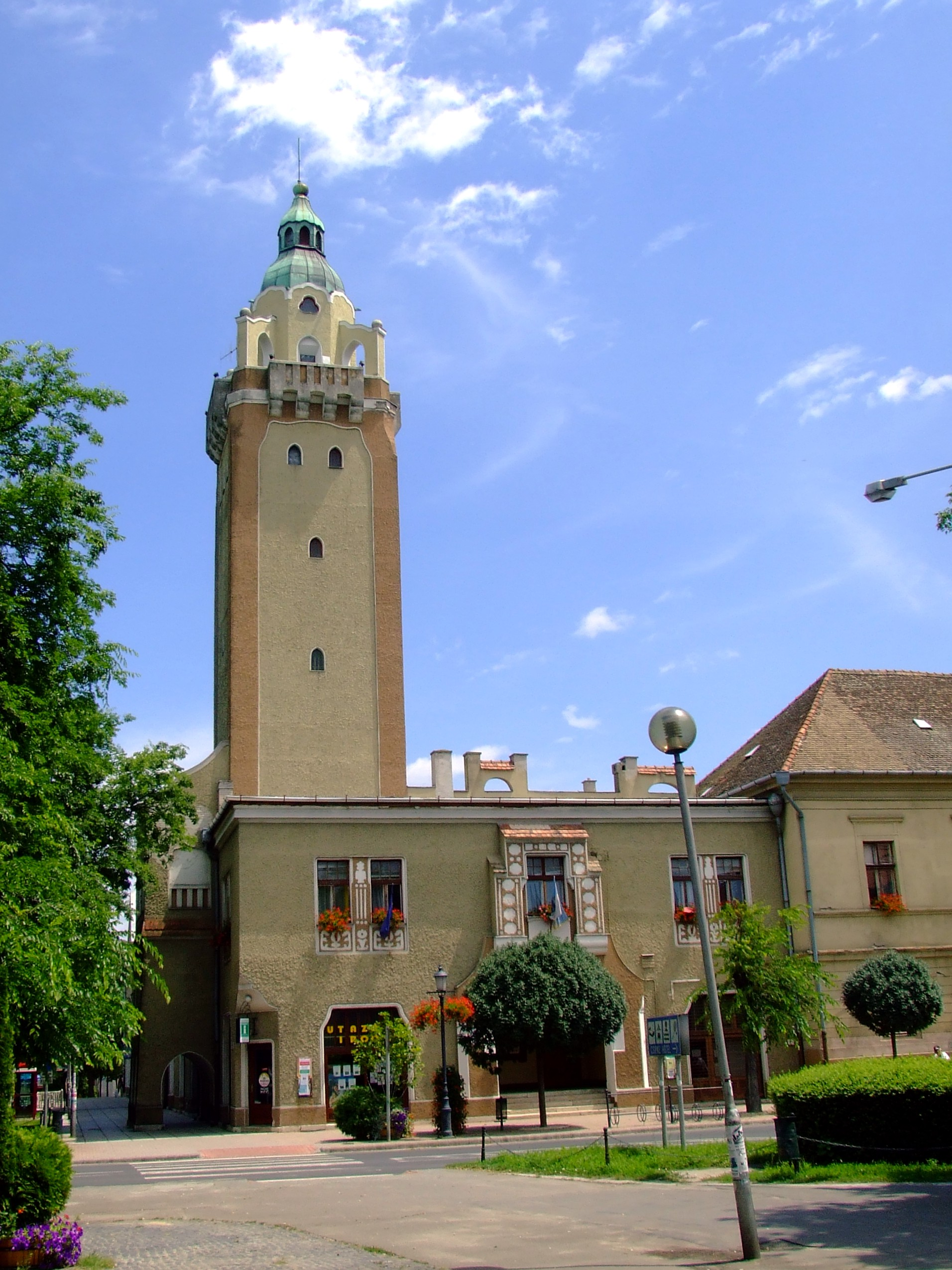

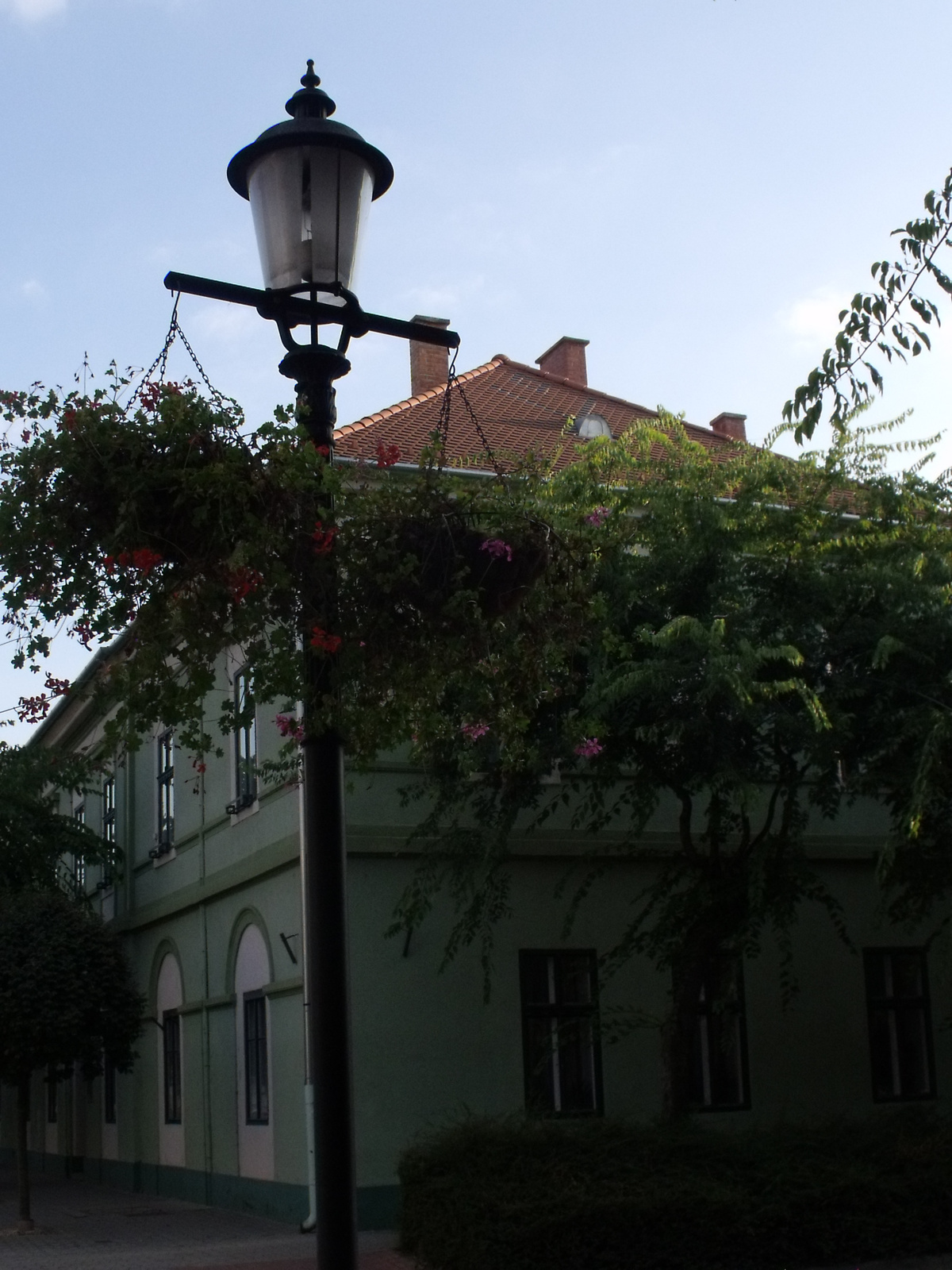

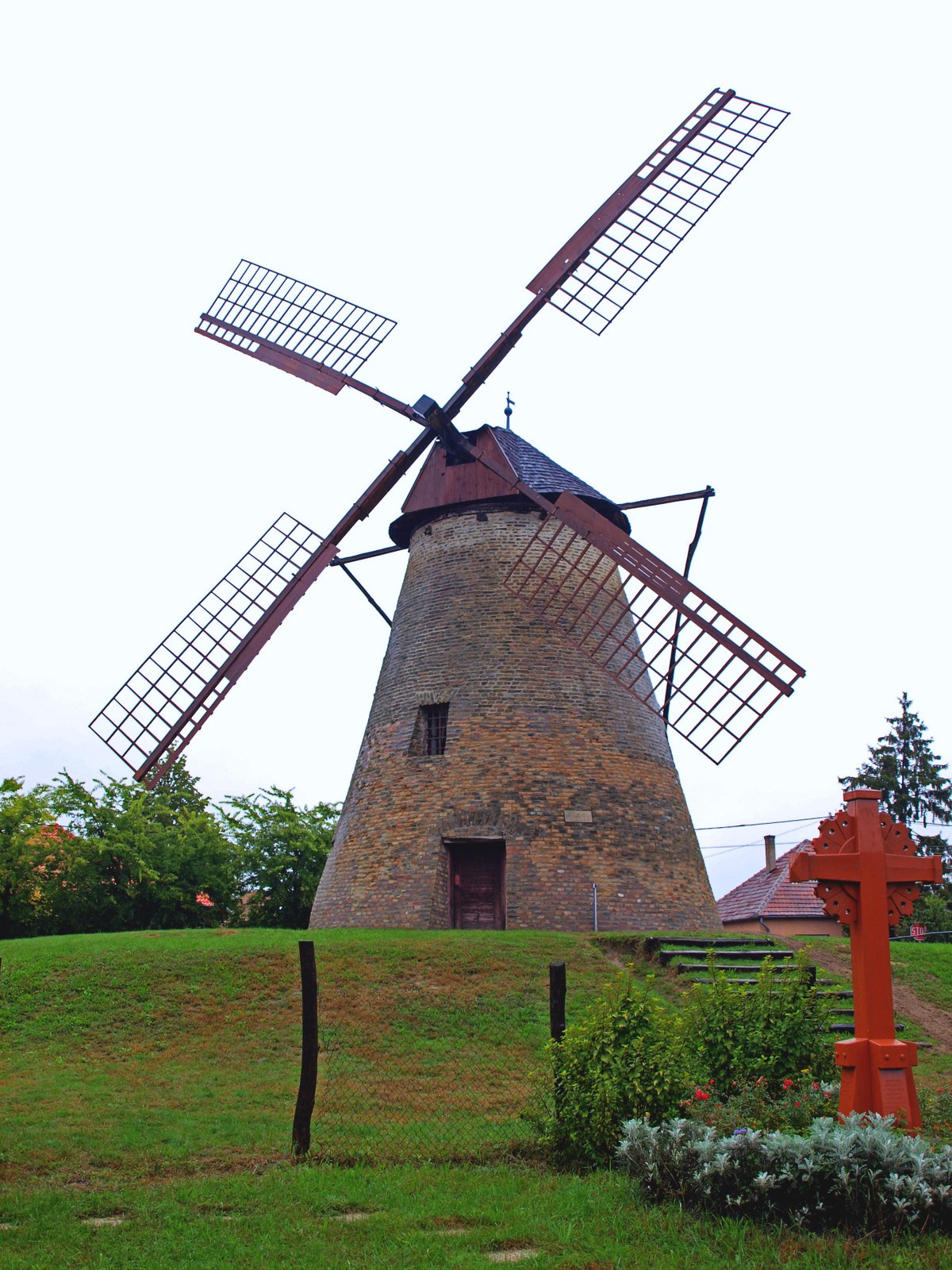

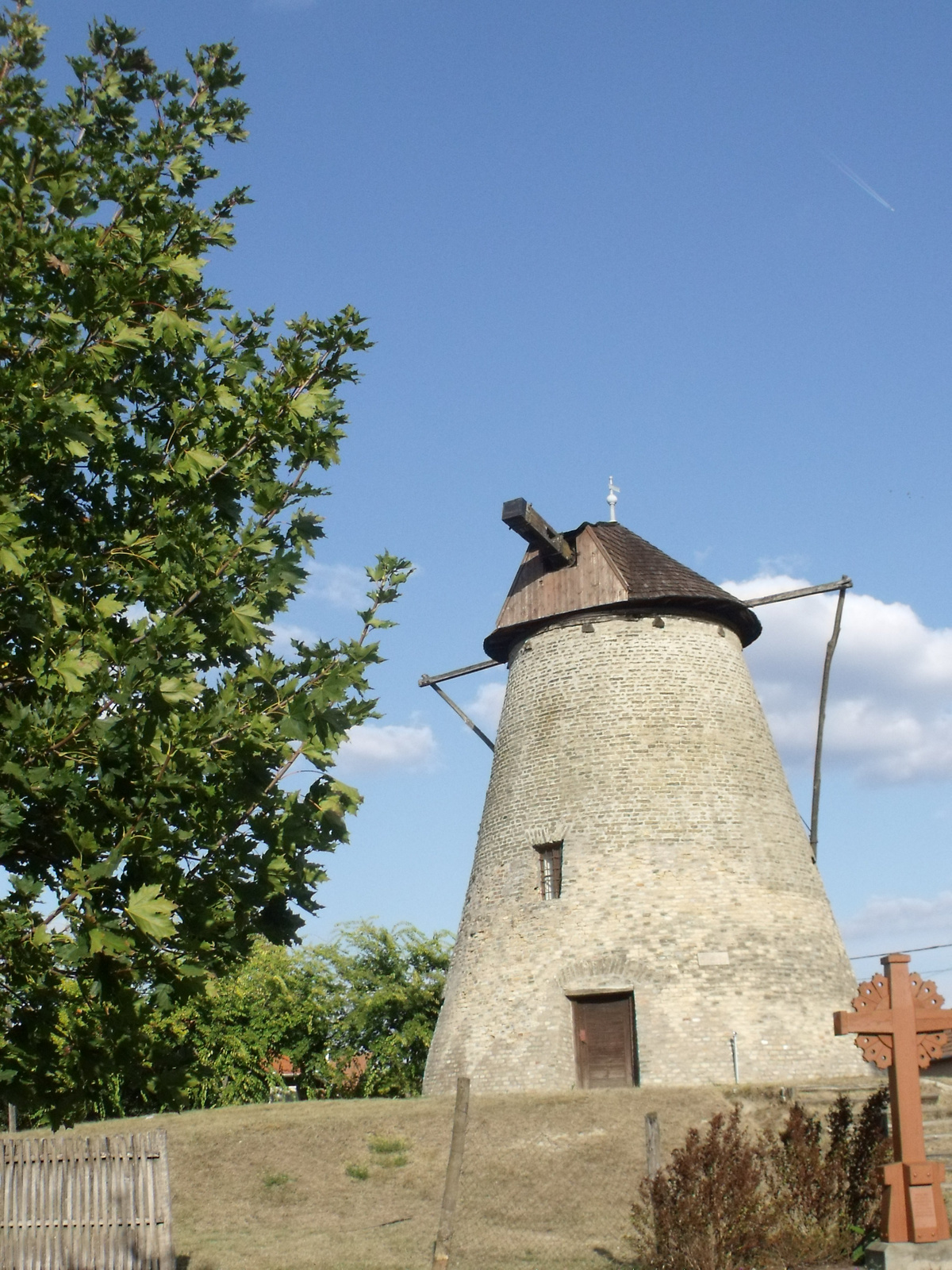

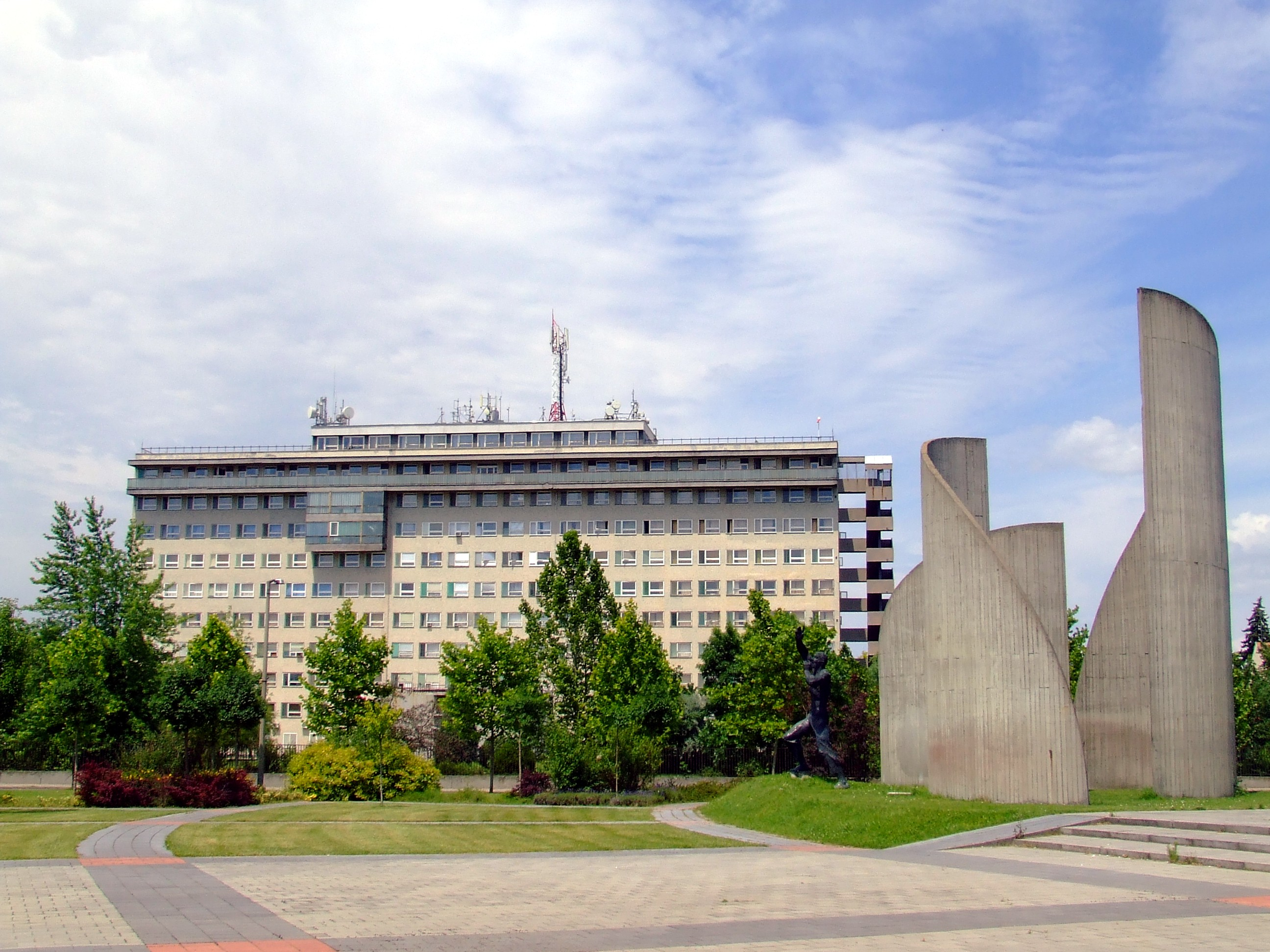

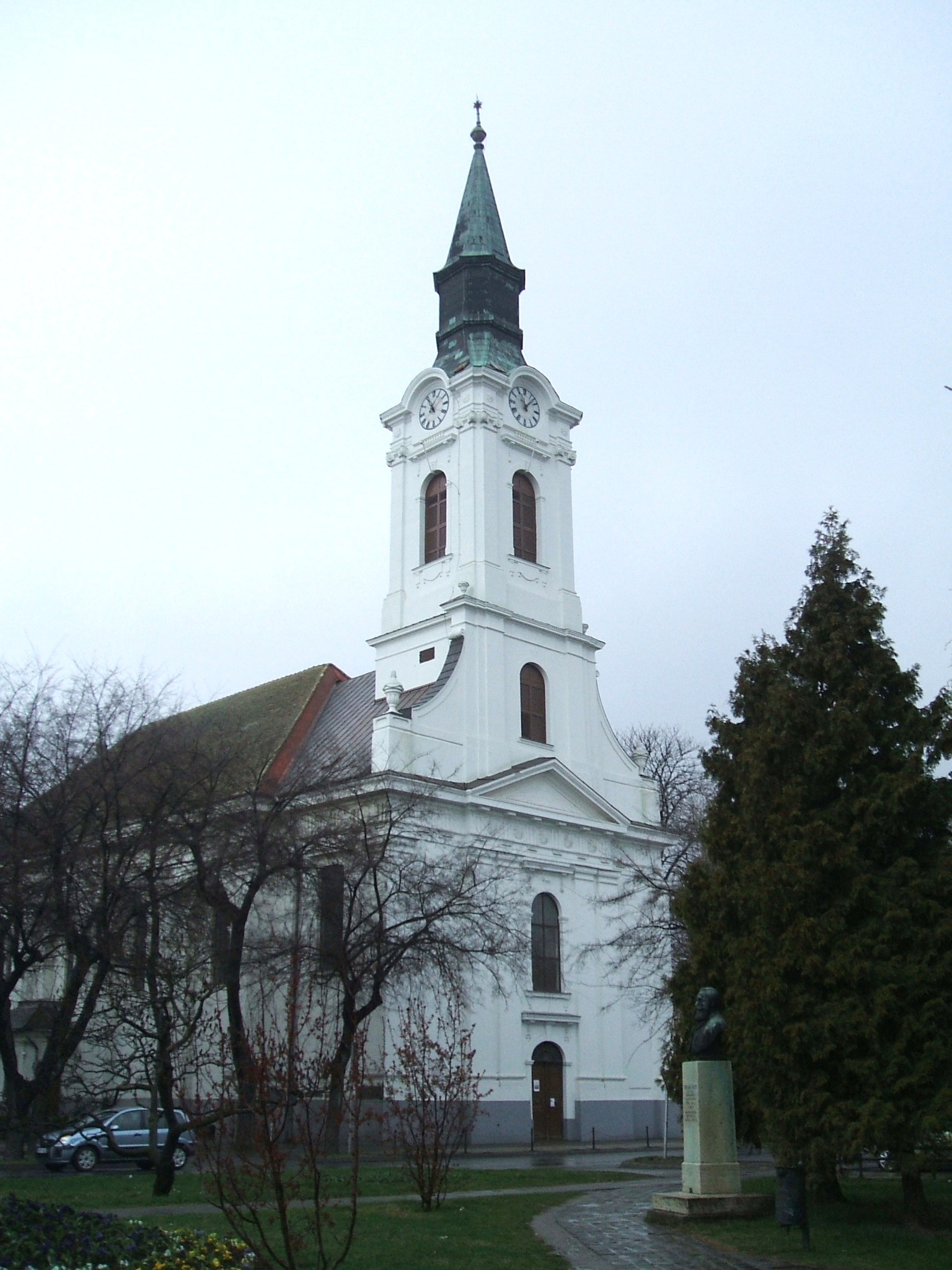

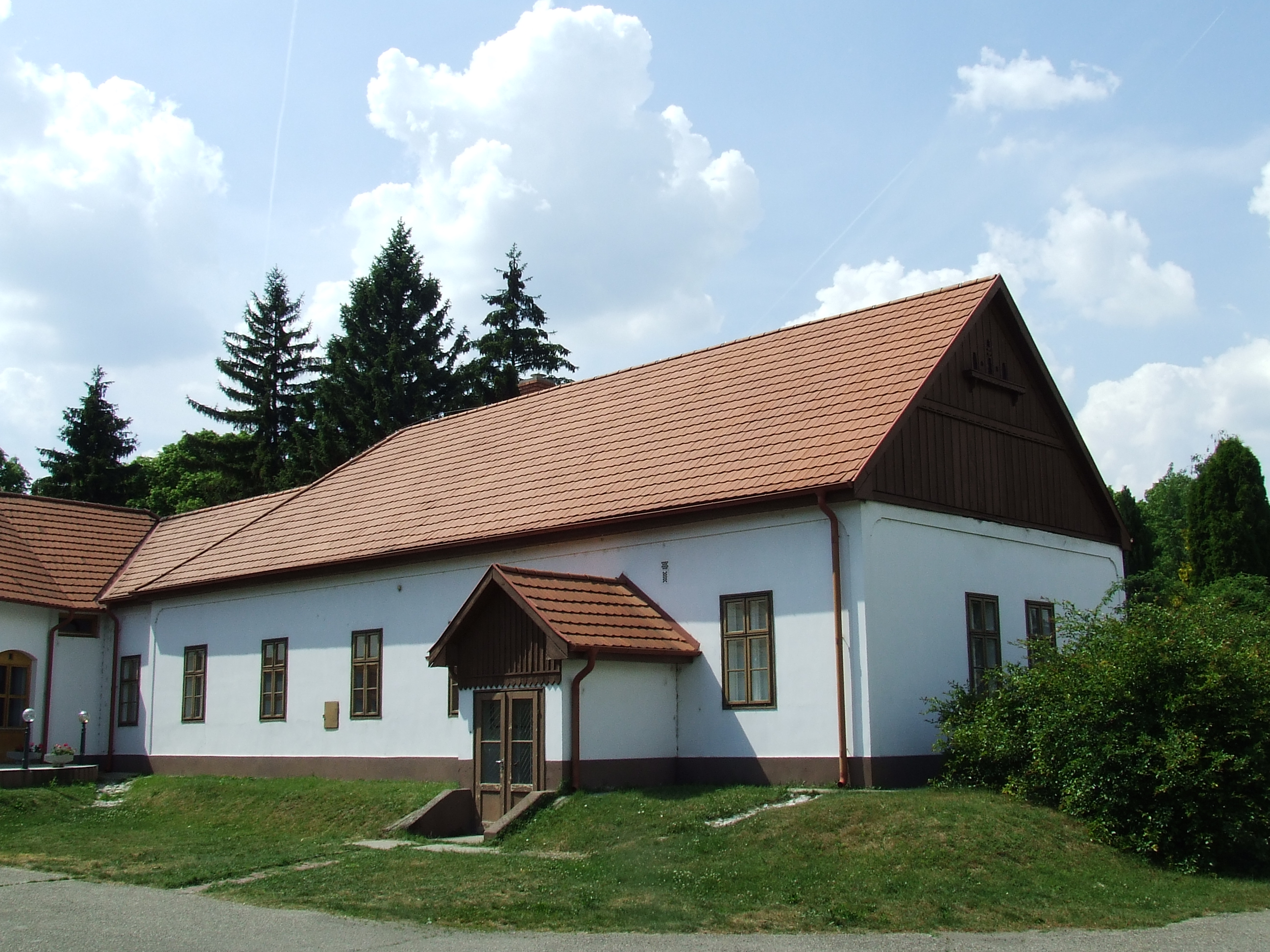

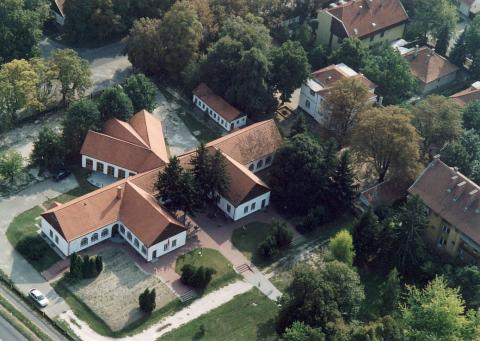

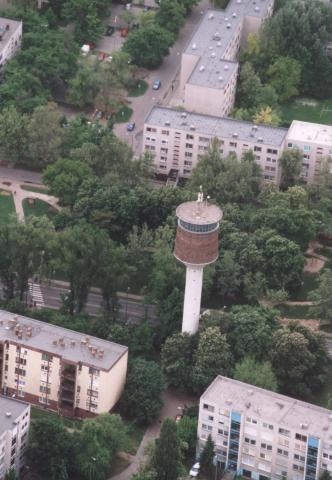

== Points of interest, attractions ==
- Halas Lace Museum After the world's first lace from Brussels, the masterpieces of Hungarian lace-makers are the most famous. In the museum you can see the lace weaving process in action, as well as the most beautiful lace from Halas displayed in glass containers. The Lace House was specifically designed as a workplace for lace weavers to preserve the patterns, designs and traditions of the world-famous Halas lace. The house was later expanded with new workrooms, a conference room and the Lace Museum. Visitors can learn about the history of lace in Halas, which began in 1902, admire the craftsmanship of the centuries-old tradition and see the process of lace weaving. Halas lace is famous not only at home but also abroad, having served as Hungary's ambassador on several occasions.
- Halas Gallery The Halas Gallery was established in 1999 for the purpose of museum management of fine art materials owned by the city of Kiskunhalas.
- Sáfrik's Windmill Built in the 1860s, the windmill was rebuilt and modernised in 1901 by the windmiller József Sáfrik. From 1940 it was used as a feed grinder. The industrial building, which is still in operation today, has been a monument since 1964.
- From 2014, Berki Gallery houses the permanent exhibition of Balázs Diószegi and Viola Berki.
- Thorma János Museum The number of objects exhibited here now exceeds 88,000. The collection is primarily ethnographic and local history, but also includes archaeological and fine and applied art material, and there is a significant Documentary, Picture and Photographic Library. János Thorma maintained a good relationship with his hometown Kiskunhalas until the end of his life, which is why the museum of the town was named after him. At the beginning of his career, Thorma was a student of Bertalan Székely in Budapest, and then joined Simon Hollósy's circle in Munich. In the museum in Kishunhalas, the "Bay Collection - Art of Nagybánya" and the "Thorma Gallery - The Painting of János Thorma" exhibits more than 100 works by 35 artists. It is thus the largest exhibition of art from Nagybánya in the country. Besides fine art, the museum also houses collections of archaeology, local history, ethnography and folk art.
- Kiskunhalasi Tájház Around 1750, the Orbán and Baki families built this thatched-roofed farmhouse with a wooden-post porch. The Tájház is a typical Halas farmer's house that preserves the peasant objects of the late 19th and early 20th centuries in Halas, showing the living conditions of the time and the buildings of the urban livestock farming.
- Végh Mansion The building was built by the nobleman István Végh, then in the second half of the 19th century a porch and outbuildings were added, and later, at the end of the century, additional outbuildings were added. In the early 1980s the building underwent a complete renovation.
- The Mourning Kuruc Statue (1904) - by József Damkó, commemorating the Kuruc dead of the Battle of Halas in 1703, the first and for a long time the only public Kuruc statue in the country
- Arpad-era village signpost - Sóstó park forest (sculpted by Attila Csák) (2001)

== Notable natives and residents ==
- János Thorma (1870–1937), a painter and founding member of the influential Nagybánya artists' colony, was born and grew up here.
- Zsolt Daczi (1969–2007), hard-rock guitarist, was born here.
- Erika Miklósa

== Sports ==
The town is the birthplace of the highest ranked Hungarian tennis player Ágnes Szávay (at one time ranked 13th in the world), who has won five WTA titles. Also Kishkunhalas is home to the soccer club Kishkunhalas Fc. Their most promising youth player is Soma Piegel.

== Twin towns – sister cities ==
Kiskunhalas is twinned with:

- Aizkraule, Latvia
- Hódmezővásárhely, Hungary
- Kanjiža, Serbia
- Kronach, Germany
- Nowy Sącz, Poland
- Sfântu Gheorghe, Romania
- Subotica, Serbia

== See also ==
- Cuman people
