= Plazović =

Kígyós Plazović
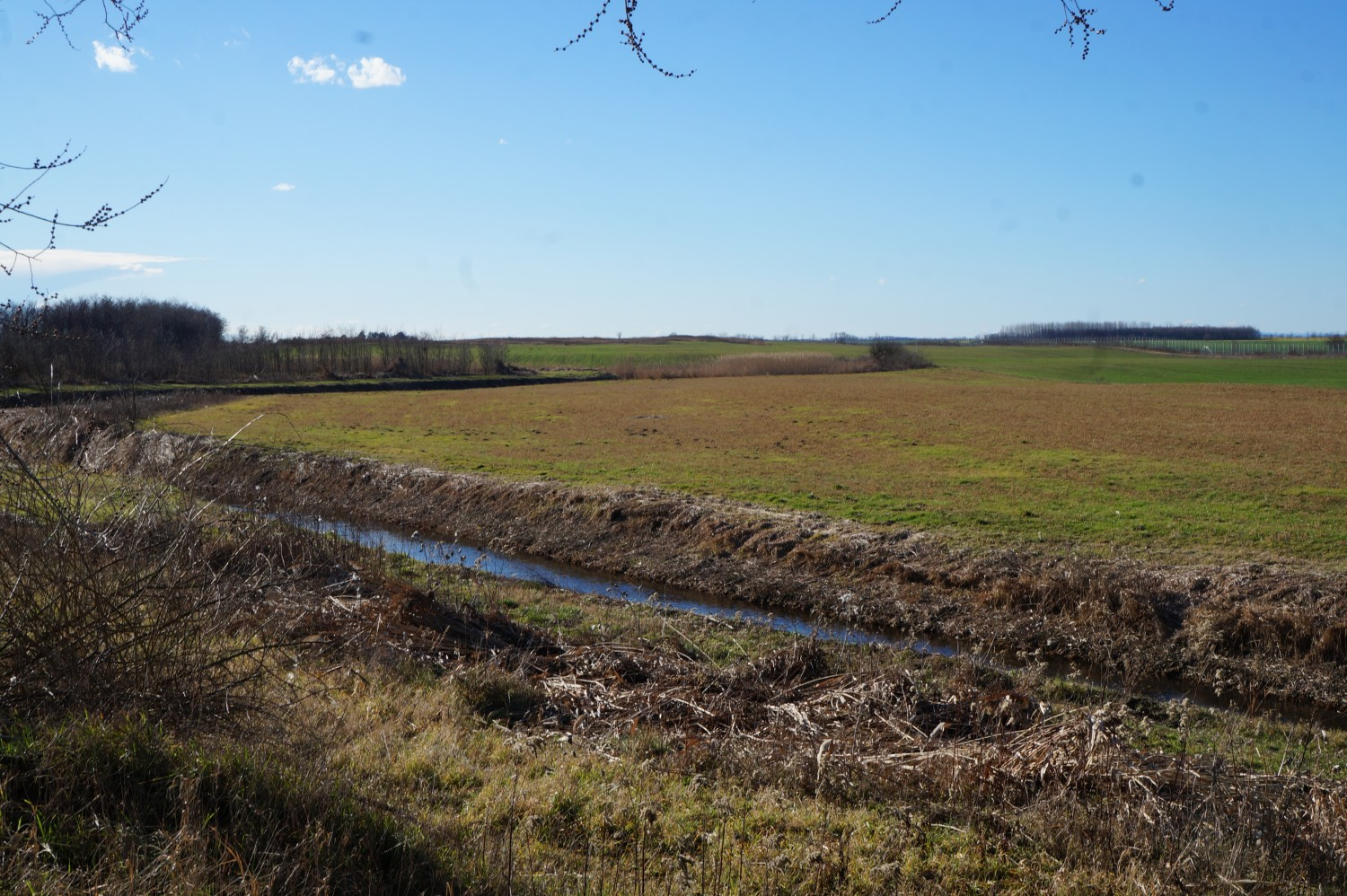

Location
- Countries: Hungary and Serbia

Physical characteristics
- Mouth
  - location: Great Bačka Canal
  - coordinates: 45°47′11″N 18°59′10″E

Basin features
- Progression: Great Bačka Canal→ Danube→ Black Sea

The Kígyós (Serbian Cyrillic: Плазовић) or Kiđoš (Hungarian: Kígyós; Serbian Cyrillic: Киђош), is a river in southern Hungary and northern Serbia. It flows entirely within the Bačka region, and during its 129 km long course, on a section of only 15 km, it crosses the Hungarian-Serbian border eight times (92 km in Hungary, 37 km in Serbia).

== Hungary ==
The Kígyós (Hungarian: snake) originates in Hungary from two streams.

One stream, the Bokodi-Kígyós-csatorna, itself originates from two smaller streams west of the city of Baja. One stream springs out at the village of Rém, other one at Borota. The streams meet at Felsőszentiván and continue to the south, next to the villages of Bácsbokod and Bácsborsód.

Another stream, the Mátételkei-Kígyós-csatorna originates north of the village of Tataháza, and it flows to the south next to the village of Mátételke. The river comes close to the Serbian border but turns west, flowing next to the village of Katymár.

East of Katymár, right before it crosses the Serbian border, the two rivers join and from that point the river is generally known as the Plazović.

== Serbia ==
In Serbia, the river turns west, flowing only within the area of Sombor municipality of the province of Vojvodina. Passes next to the village of Riđica. It flows through a park behind the Ridca castle and spills over into a series of bogs (Sekeš, Trska, Šupljina) between the villages of Bácsszentgyörgy (in Hungary) and Rastina (in Serbia). East of Bezdan, the river turns south before it empties into the Great Bačka Canal, near the village of Bački Monoštor. Between the villages of Bački Breg and Kolut, the Plazović flows next to the Bački Breg fishpond.

== Characteristics ==
The Plazović belongs to the Black Sea drainage basin.

The river is known to cause floods, especially in 1970 and 2004, but in the past it was also known for drying out completely, like in 1952. High water level is helped by the very abundant vegetation in the river's bed, which also makes the water look dark brown. During cold winters, the river freezes.

The river is neither channeled nor navigable.
