= List of palaces and mansions in Bács-Kiskun County =

This is a list of palaces and mansions in Bács-Kiskun County in Hungary.

== List of palaces and mansions in Bács-Kiskun County ==
Name	Location	Established	Architect	Style	Family	Picture	Present function
Papp-Ragány–Simala Mansion	Kecskemét			Eclecticism	Papp-Ragány; Simala		Social home
Siskovics–Fischof Mansion	Bácsalmás	19th century		Classicism	Siskovics; Fischof		Museum
Kovachich Mansion	Bácsalmás	19th century		Classicism	Kovachich		Children's home
Latinovits-Pucher-Schumacher-Sauerborn Mansion	Bácsborsód						
Grassalkovich Mansion	Baja	1744-1745		Baroque; Classicist; Neo-Renaissance	Patasich; Grassalkovich; Horváth; Viczay; Zichy-Ferraris		Town Hall of Baja
Bencze Mansion	Dunapataj	1925		Eclecticism	Bencze		
Archiepiscopal Palace	Kalocsa	1775		Baroque	Archbishop of Kalocsa		
Archiepiscopal Hunting Lodge	Hajós	1740		Baroque	Archbishop of Kalocsa		
Karapancsa Hunting Lodge	Hercegszántó						
Hercegszántó Mansion	Hercegszántó						
Orczy Mansion	Jánoshalma						
Boncompagni Mansion	Kisszállás	1855-1856		Neoclassicism	Boncompagni; Ludovisi		School
Vörös Mansion	Kunbaracs						
Tőserdő Mansion	Lakitelek						
Orczy Mansion	Pálmonostora						
Vécsey Mansion	Solt						
Geréby Mansion	Szabadszállás						
Redl Mansion	Tompa	1860		Romanticism	Rédl; Nyéky; Podmaniczky		Psychiatric institute

== See also ==
- List of palaces and mansions in Hungary
- List of castles in Hungary

== Literature ==
- Zsolt Virág : Magyar Kastélylexikon - Bács-Kiskun megye kastélyai, 2006
