= Bácsalmás District =

Bácsalmás District Bácsalmási járás
- District
- Coat of arms
- Country: Hungary
- County: Bács-Kiskun
- District seat: Bácsalmás

Area
  - Total: 561.71 km^{2} (216.88 sq mi)
  - Rank: 8th in Bács-Kiskun

Population (2011 census)
  - Total: 20,094
  - Rank: 9th in Bács-Kiskun
  - Density: 52/km^{2} (130/sq mi)

Bácsalmás (Hungarian: Bácsalmási járás; German: Kreis Almasch) is a district in southern part of Bács-Kiskun County. Bácsalmás is also the name of the town where the district seat is found. The district is located in the Southern Great Plain Statistical Region.

== Geography ==
Bácsalmás District borders with Jánoshalma District and Kiskunhalas District to the north, the Serbian districts of North Bačka to the east and West Bačka to the south, Baja District to the west and north. The number of the inhabited places in Bácsalmás District is 10.

== Municipalities ==
The district has 1 town, 1 large village and 8 villages. (ordered by population, as of 1 January 2013)

- **Bácsalmás** (6,811) – district seat
- Bácsbokod (2,656)
- Bácsborsód (1,179)
- Bácsszőlős (349)
- Csikéria (868)
- Katymár (1,951)
- Kunbaja (1,562)
- Madaras (2,903)
- Mátételke (476)
- Tataháza (1,228)

The bolded municipality is city, italics municipality is large village.

== Demographics ==
Religion in Bácsalmás District (2011 census)
1. Catholic Church (59.8%)
2. Greek Catholicism (0.10%)
3. Calvinism (5.20%)
4. Lutheranism (0.20%)
5. Other religions (0.90%)
6. Non-religious (10.0%)
7. Atheists (0.70%)
8. Undeclared (23.1%)

In 2011, it had a population of 20,094 and the population density was 38/km².

Year	County population	Change
2011	20,094	n/a

=== Ethnicity ===
Besides the Hungarian majority, the main minorities are the German (approx. 1,100), Croat (550), Roma (300) and Serb (100).

Total population (2011 census): 20,094
Ethnic groups (2011 census): Identified themselves: 19,600 persons:

- Hungarians: 17,512 (89.35%)
- Germans: 1,062 (5.42%)
- Croats: 568 (2.90%)
- Gypsies: 291 (1.48%)
- Others and indefinable: 167 (0.85%)

Approx. 500 persons in Bácsalmás District did not declare their ethnic group at the 2011 census.

=== Religion ===
Religious adherence in the county according to 2011 census:

- Catholic – 12,041 (Roman Catholic – 12,019; Greek Catholic – 21);
- Reformed – 1,048;
- Evangelical – 36;
- other religions – 169;
- Non-religious – 2,016;
- Atheism – 138;
- Undeclared – 4,646.

== Gallery ==
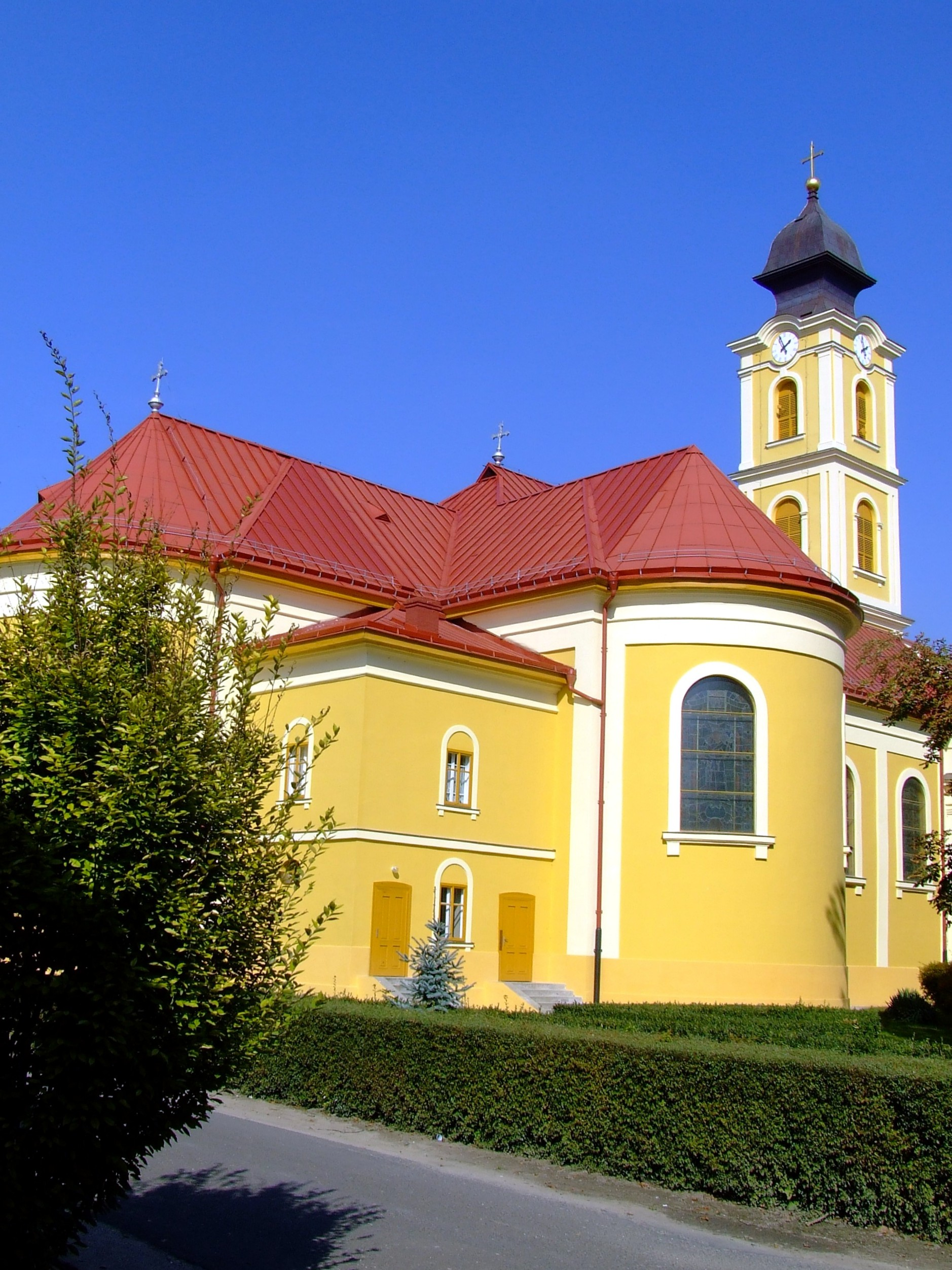
Bácsalmás, the district seat

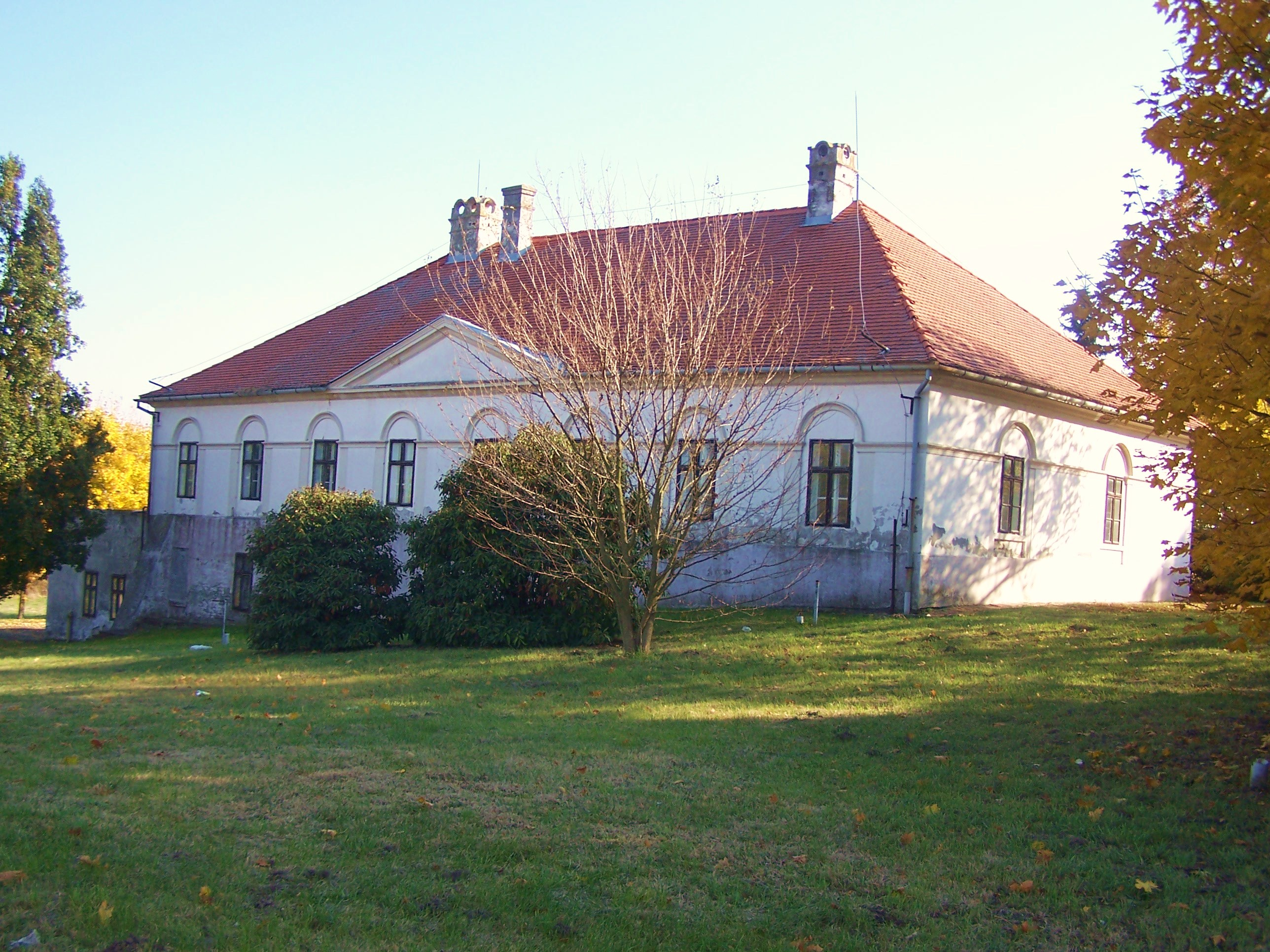
Latinovits Mansion in Bácsborsód

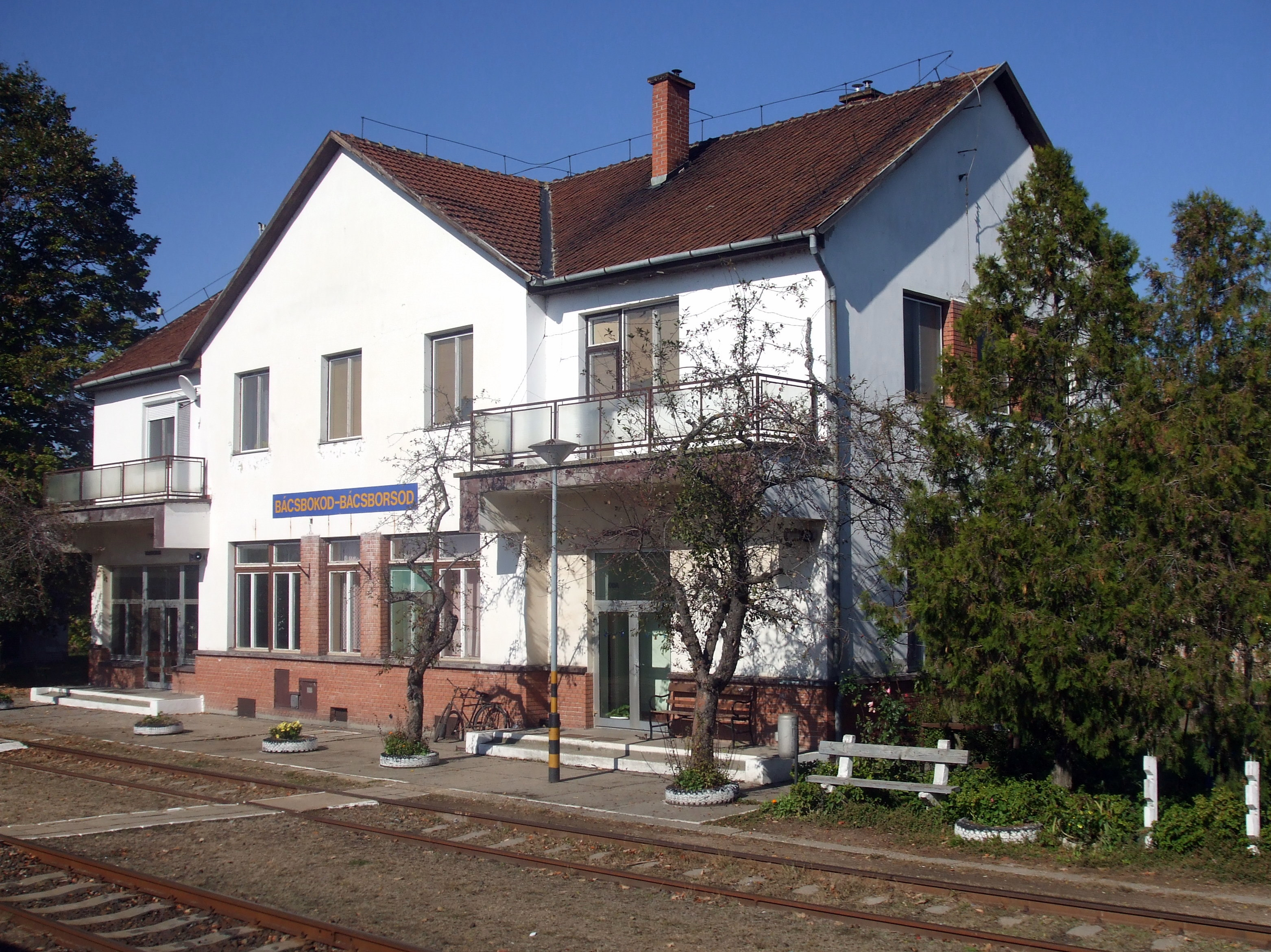
Bácsbokod-Bácsborsód railway station

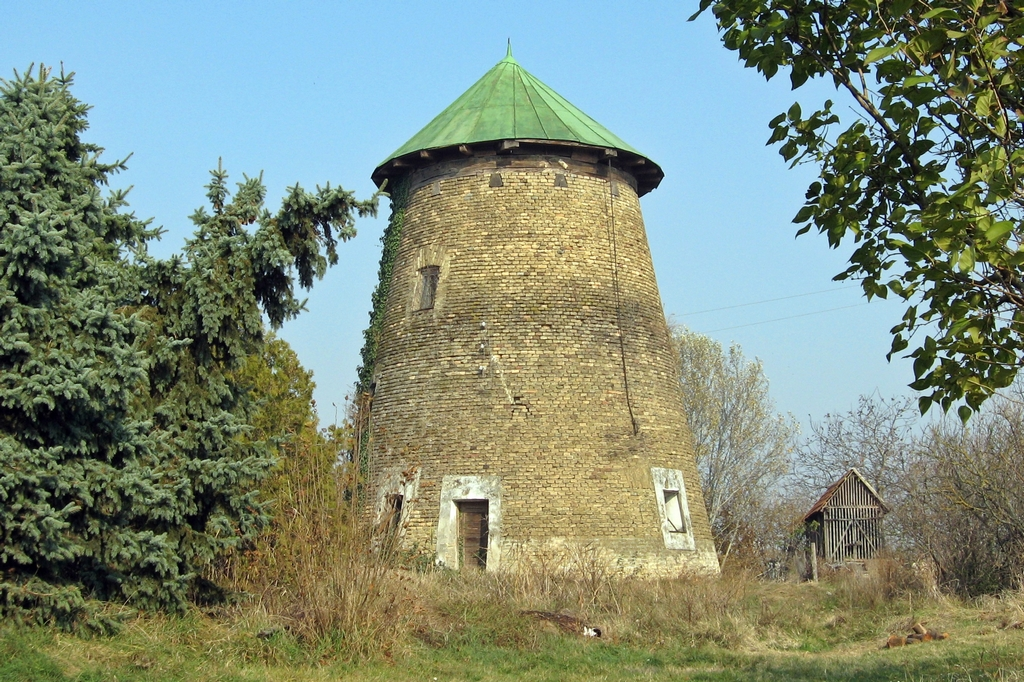
Windmill near Tataháza

== See also ==
- List of cities and towns of Hungary
