= Viczay =

Viczay is a Hungarian surname. Notable people with the name include:

- Ádám Viczay, Hungarian nobleman, member of the Baron Viczay de Loós family
- Beled Viczay (1237–1291), Hungarian nobleman, the first provable member of the Viczay de Loós family
- Éva Viczay (1602–1651), Hungarian noblewoman, the second wife of Baron Pál Esterházy de Galántha
- Héder Viczay (1807–1873), Hungarian traveller, amateur archaeologist, collector, Imperial and Royal Privy Councillor
- János Viczay (1615–1656), Hungarian nobleman, member of the Baron Viczay de Loós family
- Jób Viczay (1700–1734), Hungarian nobleman, the first member of the Count Viczay de Loós et Hédervár family
- Mihály Viczay (1757–1831), Hungarian numismatist, amateur archaeologist, collector
- Tamás Viczay, Hungarian nobleman, Count of Sopron County from 1347 to 1360
