= Smiljevac =

Smiljevac may refer to:

- Smiljevac, Serbia, a village near Ivanjica
- Smiljevac, Zadar, a section of Zadar, Croatia
- Smiljevac, Bosnia and Herzegovina, a village near Lopare
- Smiljevac, a hamlet of Bácsalmás, Hungary
