= János Bencze =

János Bencze may refer to:

- János Bencze (footballer)
- János Bencze (basketball)
