= Heder (disambiguation) =

Heder may refer to:

- Cheder, a traditional elementary school teaching the basics of Judaism and the Hebrew language
- Héder (genus), a gens in the Kingdom of Hungary
- Heder (Lippe), a river of North Rhine-Westphalia, Germany, tributary of the Lippe
- Heder (TV series), a Swedish television series

== People with that name ==
- Héder, a German knight who settled down in the Kingdom of Hungary, eponymous co-founder of the Héder gens
- Carsten Meyer-Heder (born 1961), German CDU politician
- János Héder (1933–2014), Hungarian gymnast
- Jon Heder (born 1977), American actor and producer
- Léopold Héder (1918–1978), politician from French Guiana who served in the French National Assembly and in the French Senate
- Sian Heder (born 1977), American writer and filmmaker
- Héder Viczay (1807–1873), Hungarian traveler, amateur archaeologist, collector, Imperial and Royal Privy Councillor
