= János Viczay =

Hungarian nobleman (1615-1656)

- Born: 1615
- Died: 1656 (aged 40–41)

Baron János Viczay de Loós (1615 – 1656) was a Hungarian nobleman, member of the Baron Viczay de Loós family.

His father was Baron Ádám de Loós (died 1645). János married Baroness Katalin Hédervári de Hédervár, daughter of the last Hédervári couple, Baron István and Baroness Erzsébet Esterházy de Galántha. As a result, he inherited the Hédervári estate in Hédervár and despised the riches of his family. The Viczay family became new owner of Hédervár.

He had a son, Ádám, whose child, Jób received the title of Count Viczay de Loós et Hédervár. János had three more daughters: Erzsébet, Borbála, Terézia.
