= Mihály Viczay =

Hungarian numismatist, amateur archaeologist, collector (1757–1831)

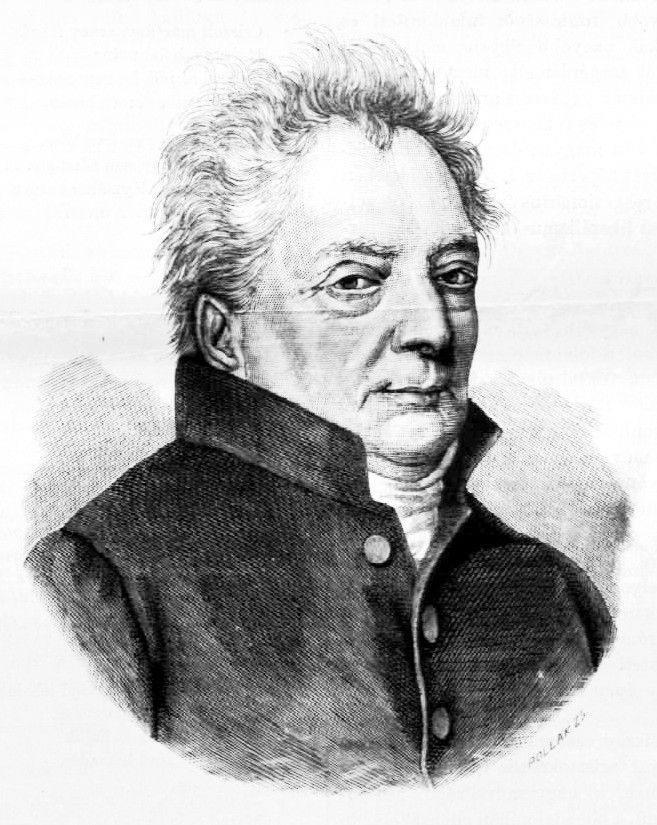
- Born: 25 July 1757; Hédervár, Kingdom of Hungary
- Died: 18 March 1831 (aged 73)
- Occupations: archaeologist, numismatist

Count Mihály Viczay de Loós et Hédervár (25 July 1757 – 18 March 1831) was a Hungarian numismatist, amateur archaeologist and collector. He was a member of the old noble Viczay family.

== Early life ==
Viczay was born on 25 July 1757. His parents were Count Ferenc Mihály and Countess Terézia Draskovich.

== Career ==
At first, he studied law, but very interested in archeology, so he retired to Hédervár, where antiques and had already accumulated a collection of coins. One of the most beautiful museum was his private collection in his birthplace, where a large number of foreign scientists visited. Among others, like the Italian Sestini and English writer Robert Towns also commemorated those collections.

== Personal life ==
On 15 June 1775, he married Countess Mária Anna Grassalkovich de Gyarak, a daughter of Count Antal Grassalkovich and Mária Anna Esterházy de Galántha (a daughter of Nikolaus I, Prince Esterházy). Among her siblings was Countess Erzsébet Grassalkovich de Gyarak, who married Count Ferenc Esterházy de Galántha (the son of Count Ferenc Esterházy). Together, they had three children:

- Mihály Viczay (b. 1777), who married Countess Mária Zichy de Zich et Vásonkeő.
- Ferenc Viczay (1780–1836), who married Countess Amália Zichy de Zich et Vásonkeő.
- Karolina Viczay (1789–1839), who married Count Antal II Khuen de Belás.

Viczay died on 18 March 1831.

=== Descendants ===
Through his son Ferenc, he was a grandfather of Count Héder Viczay.

Through his daughter Karolina, he was a great-grandfather of Károly Khuen-Héderváry, who twice served as Prime Minister of Hungary.
