= Pál Esterházy (1587–1645) =

Hungarian noble (1587-1645)

- Baron of Galántha
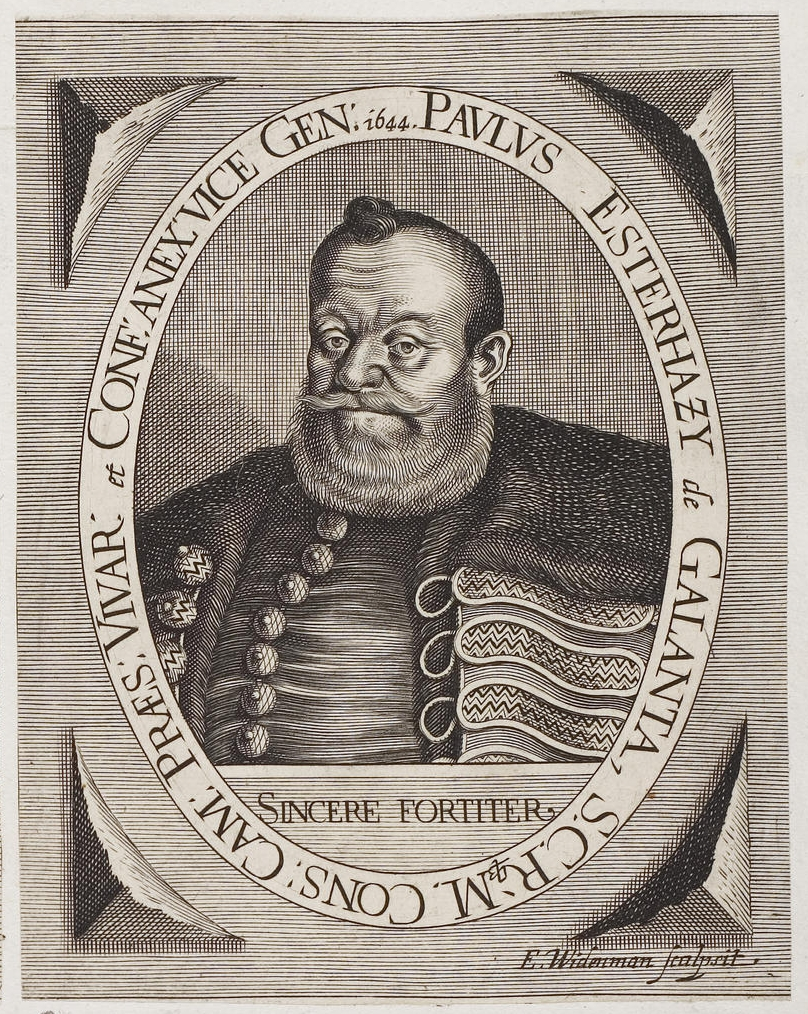
- Full name: Baron Pál Esterházy de Galántha
- Born: 1 February 1587; Galántha, Kingdom of Hungary (today: Galanta, Slovakia)
- Died: 17 January 1645 (aged 57); Érsekújvár, Kingdom of Hungary (today: Nové Zámky, Slovakia)
- Noble family: House of Esterházy
- Spouses: Zsuzsanna Károlyi de Nagykároly (1614–1621); Éva Viczay de Loós (1625–1645)
- Issue: See below for issue
- Father: Ferenc Esterházy de Galántha
- Mother: Zsófia Illésházy de Illésháza

Baron Pál Esterházy de Galántha (1 February 1587 – 17 January 1645) was a Hungarian noble, son of Vice-ispán (Viscount; vicecomes) of Pozsony County Ferenc Esterházy. He was the founder of the Zólyom branch of the House of Esterházy. His brother was, among others, Nikolaus, Count Esterházy who served as Palatine of Hungary.

== Life ==
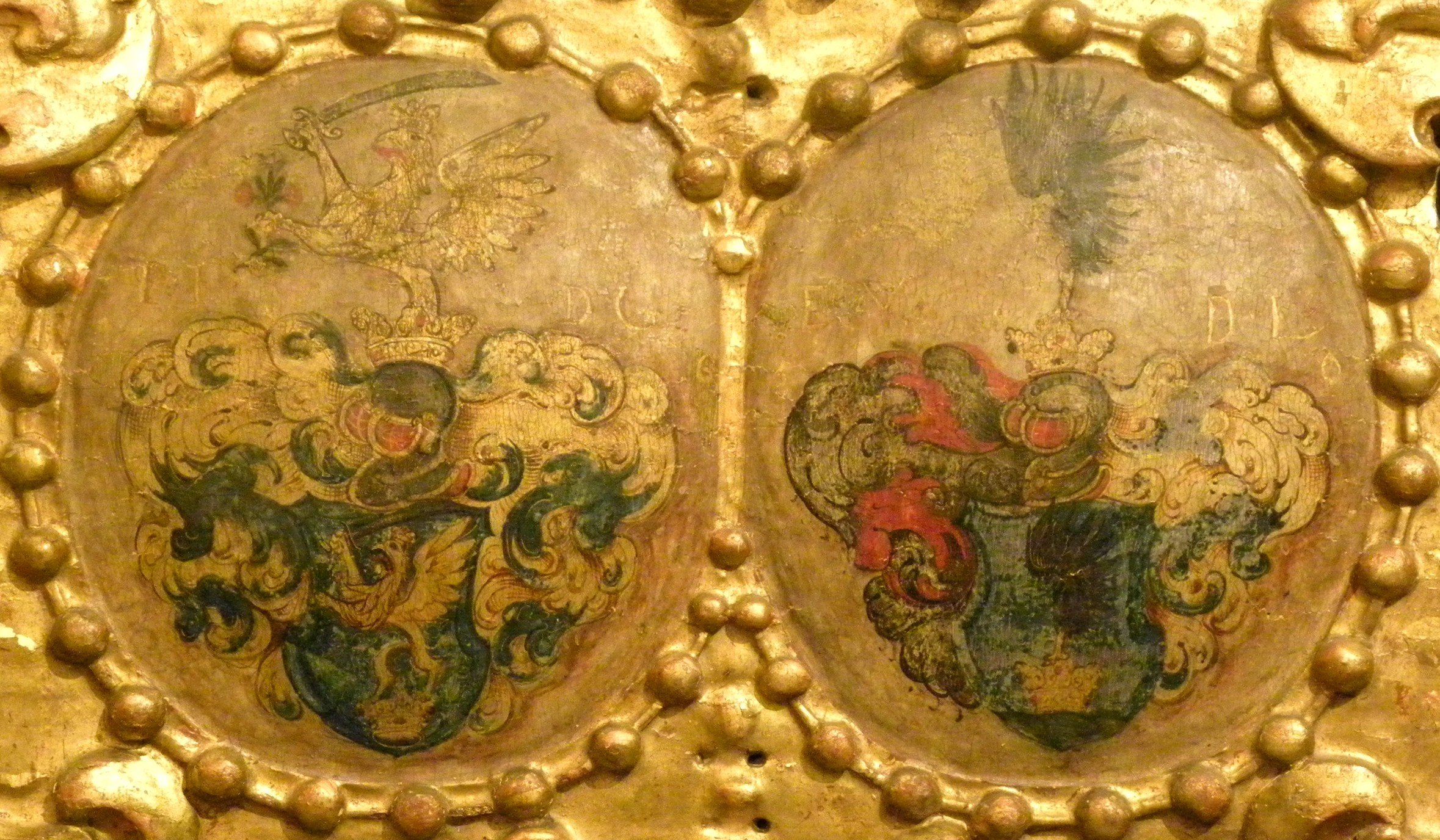
Coat of arms of Baron Pál and Éva Viczay (Slovak National Gallery, Bratislava)

He converted to Roman Catholicism from Lutheranism in his youth. He served as chamberlain of Gabriel Bethlen, Prince of Transylvania. Later he joined to the side of Matthias II of Hungary. He was appointed Knight of the Golden Spur after the coronation of Ferdinand II.

Pál fought in the Thirty Years' War, against the Bohemian uprising. As a result, he was created Baron in 1619. He was seriously injured in Moravia. In 1626, he defended the fortress of Nógrád and also participated in other battles against the Ottoman Empire. He acquired the lordships of Zólyom (today: Zvolen, Slovakia) and Dobrovina from his brother Miklós, the Palatine. Baron Pál founded the Zólyom branch of his family.

== Family ==
Baron Pál Esterházy married to Zsuzsanna Károlyi de Nagykároly at first in 1614. They had three children:

- Ferenc (1615 – 26 August 1652), killed in the Battle of Vezekény
- Erzsébet (1616–1668), married to Baron István Hédervári de Hédervár in 1634
- Zsuzsa, died young (c. 1634)

His first wife, Zsuzsanna died in 1621. Baron Pál married for the second time to Éva Viczay de Loós, younger sister of Baron Ádám Viczay de Loós. The marriage produced the following children:

- Emenne (1626–1631), died young
- Rebeka (1631 – after 16 June 1647)
- Zsófia (1633 – 20 March 1688), married to Baron György Berényi de Karancsberény (1601–1677) in 1650
- Miklós (1634 – 19 August 1688), Ispán (Count; comes) of Zólyom County, castellan of Buják
- Magdolna (1635–1708)
- Sándor (1636 – 2 April 1681), heir of the Zólyom lordships
- Ilona (1638 – 26 September 1651), died young
- Gábor (d. before 1653)
- Péter (d. before 1653)
- Dániel (d. before 1653)
