= Royal Palace of Gödöllő =

Royal palace in Gödöllő, Hungary

Coordinates: 47°35′46″N 19°20′52″E

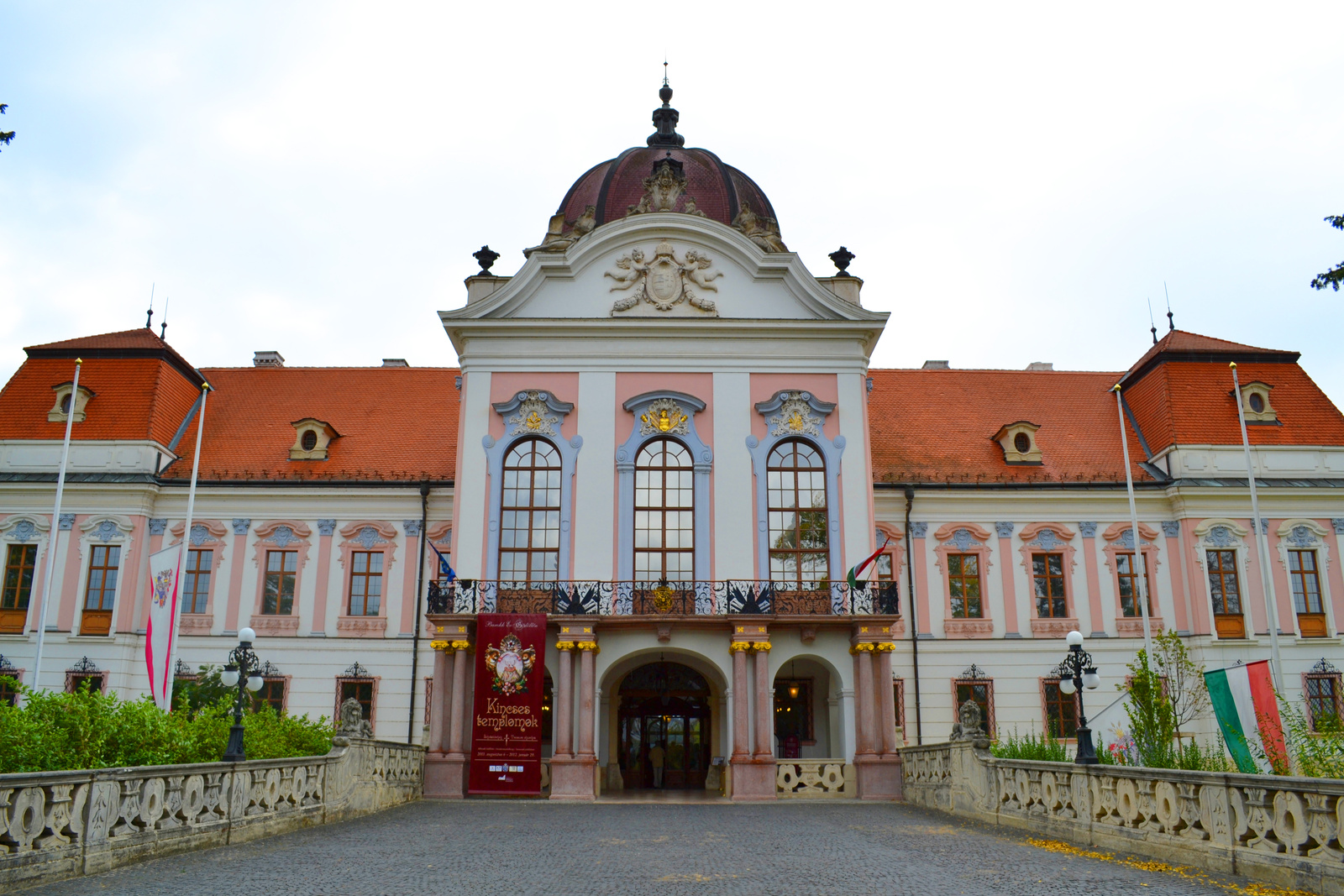
Main entrance of the palace

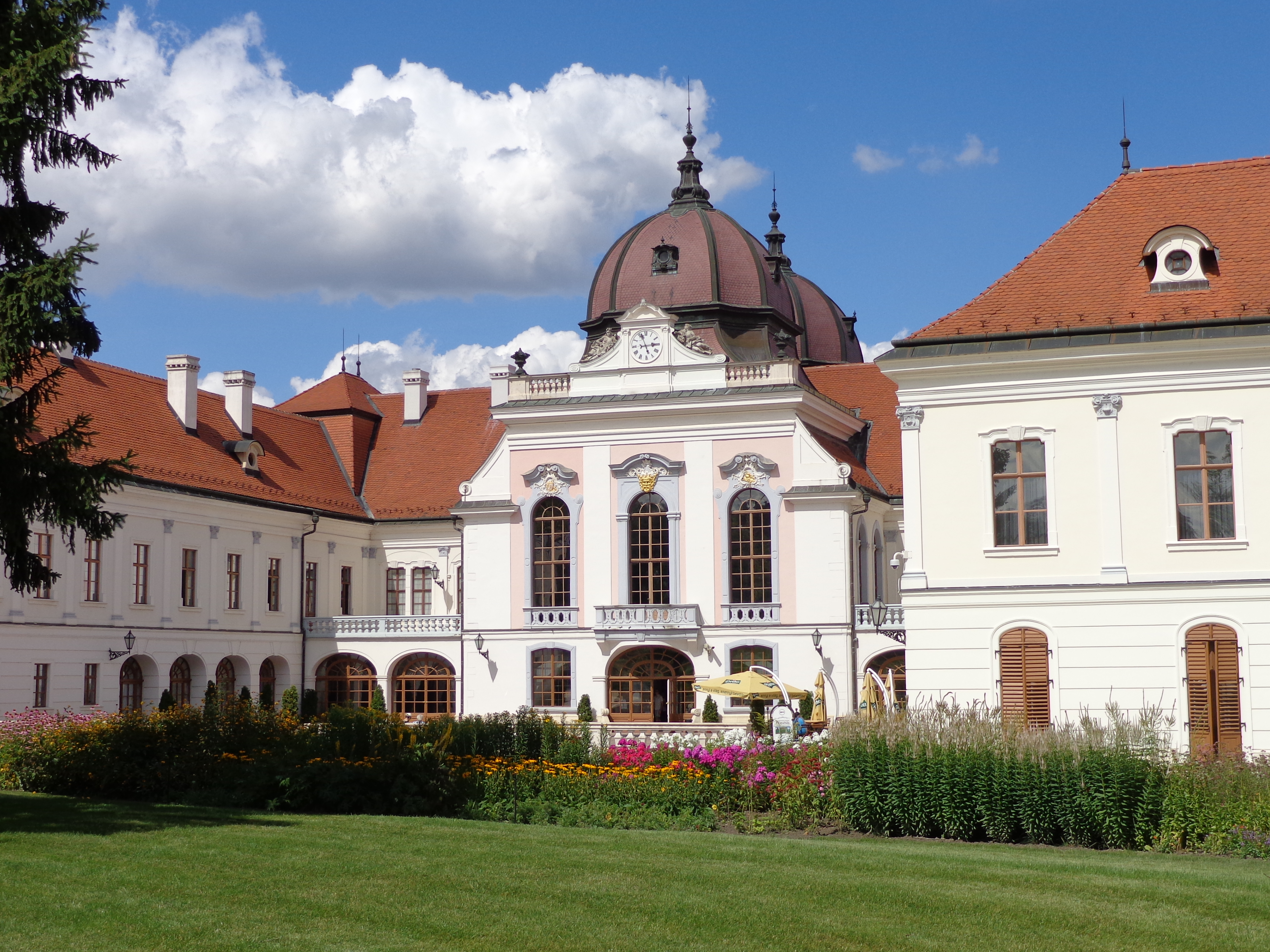
From the garden

The Royal Palace of Gödöllő (German: Schloss Gödöllő, Hungarian: Gödöllői Királyi Kastély) or Grassalkovich Castle is an imperial and royal Hungarian palace located in the municipality of Gödöllő in Pest county, central Hungary. It is famous for being a favourite palace of the penultimate Queen of Hungary.

== History ==
=== Origins ===
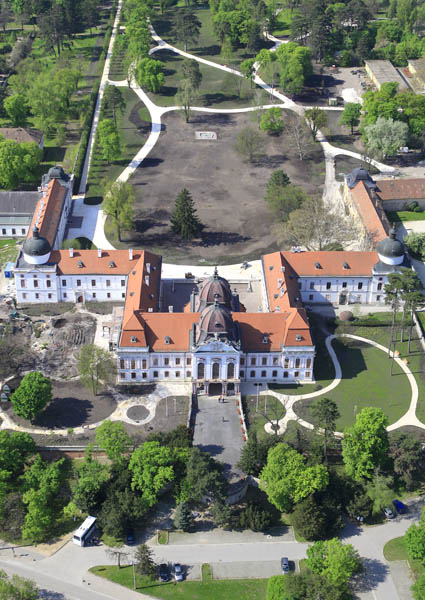
Photo of aerial view of the Royal Palace of Gödöllő, Hungary, picture taken in 2010

The palace is one of the most important, largest monuments of Hungarian palace architecture. Its builder, Count Antal Grassalkovich I (1694–1771) was a typical figure of the regrouping Hungarian aristocracy of the 18th century. He was a Royal Septemvir, president of the Hungarian Chamber, and confidant of Empress Maria Theresa (1740–1780). The construction began around 1733, under the direction of András Mayerhoffer (1690–1771) a famous builder from Salzburg who worked in Baroque and Zopf style.

The palace has a double U shape, and is surrounded by an enormous park. The building underwent several enlargements and modifications during the 18th century; its present shape being established in the time of the third generation of the Grassalkovich family. By then the building had 8 wings, and - besides the residential part - it contained a church, a theatre, a riding-hall, a hothouse, a greenhouse for flowers and an orangery.

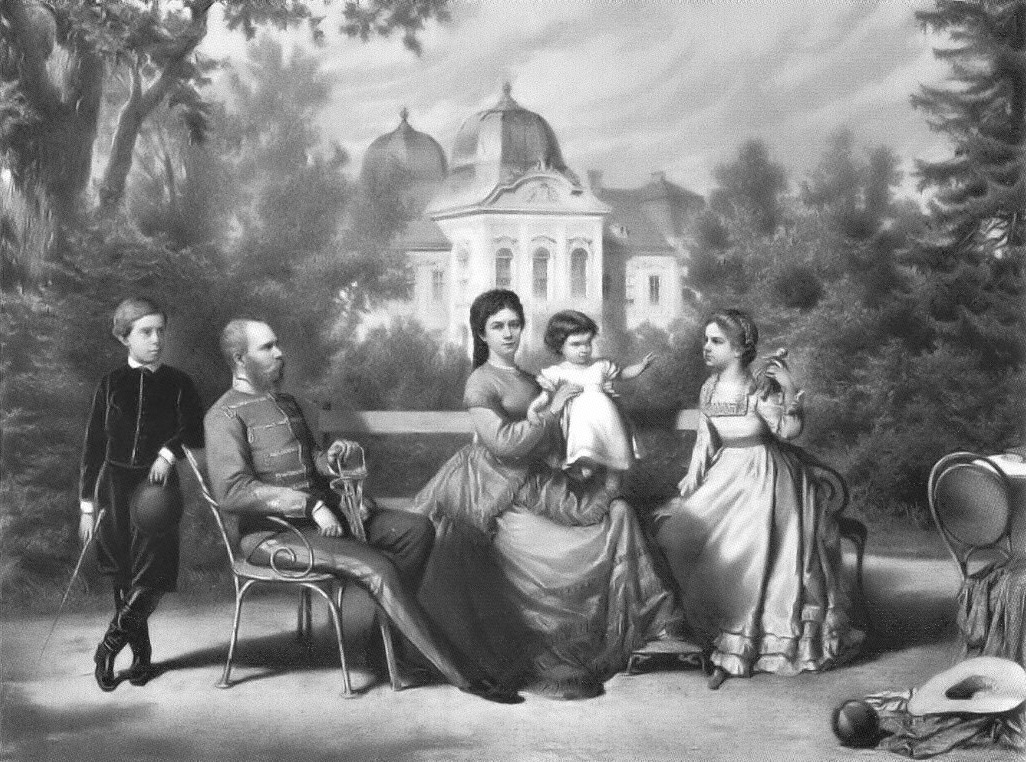
King Franz Joseph and Queen Elisabeth with the royal family at Gödöllő

After the male side of the Grassalkovich family died out in 1841, the palace had several owners, and in 1867 it was bought for the crown. The decision of parliament designated it the resting residence of the King of Hungary. This state lasted until 1918, thus Francis Joseph (1867–1916) and later Charles IV and the royal family spent several months in Gödöllő every year.

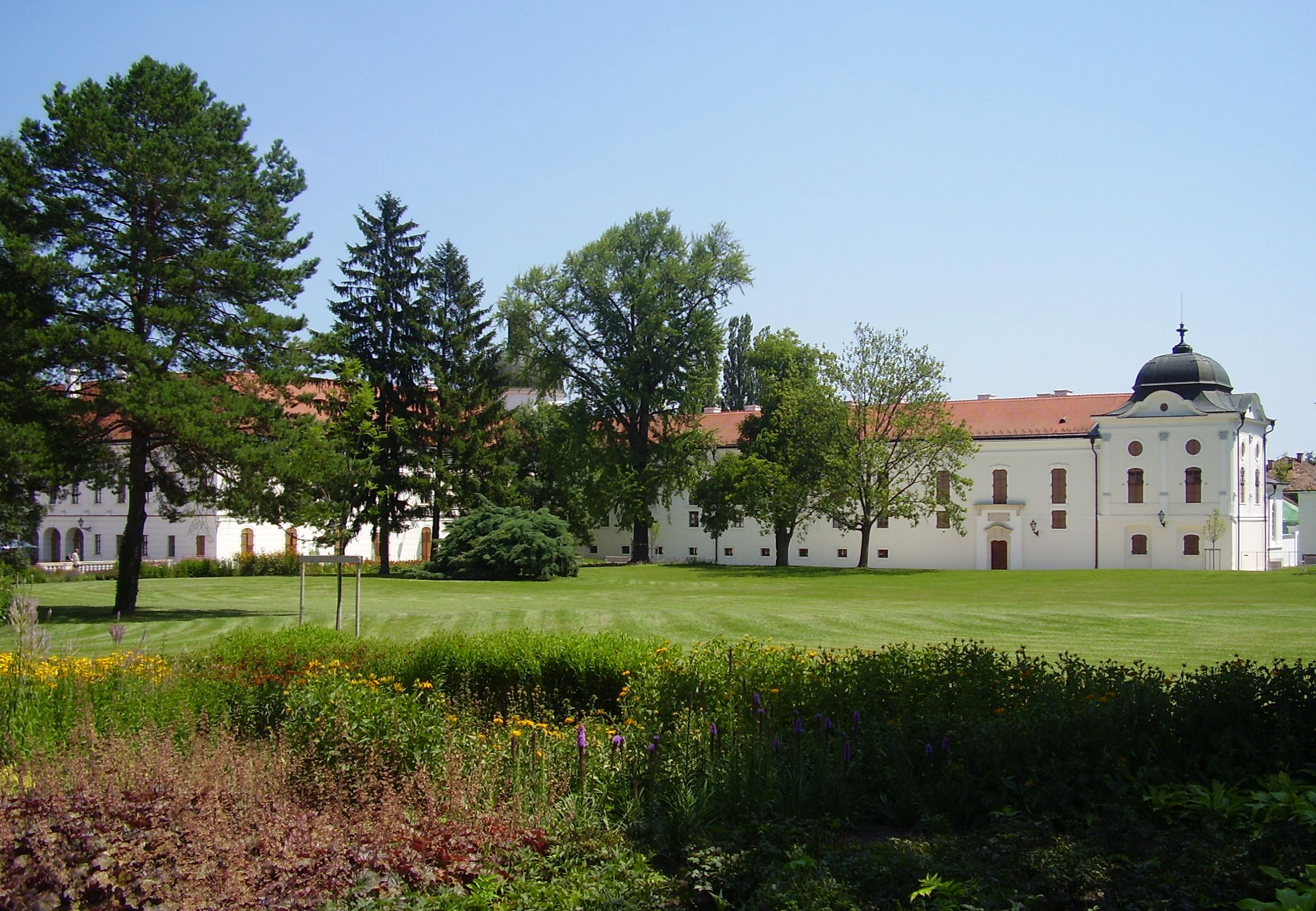
Garden of the palace

During this period the palace became the symbol of independent Hungarian statehood, and, as a residential centre it had a political significance of its own. It was Queen Elisabeth (1837–1898) who especially loved staying in Gödöllő, where the Hungarian personnel and neighbourhood of the palace always warmly welcomed her. She was able to converse fluently in Hungarian. Following her tragic death, a memorial park adjoining the upper-garden was built.

The period of the royal decades also brought their enlargements and modifications. The suites were made more comfortable, and a marble stable and coach house were built. The riding hall was remodelled.

Between the two world wars the palace served as the residence for Regent Miklós Horthy. No significant building took place during this period, apart from an air-raid shelter in the southern front garden. After 1945 the palace, like many other buildings in Hungary, fell into decay.

Soviet and Hungarian troops used the building, some of the beautifully decorated rooms were used for an old people's home, and the park was divided into smaller plots of land.

=== The beginning of rehabilitation and preservation ===
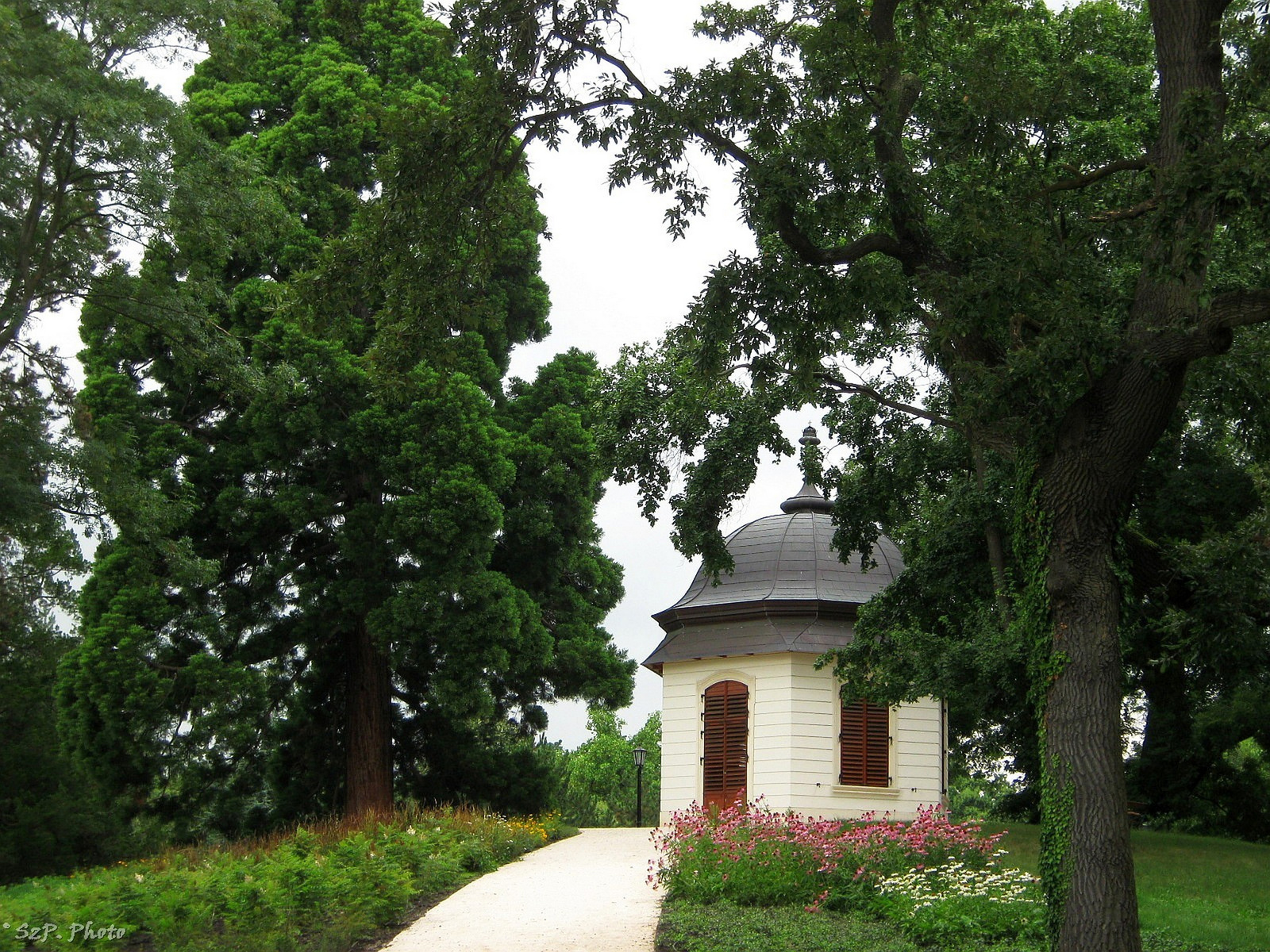
Royal Pavilion

The protection of the palace as a historical monument started in 1981, when the National Board for Monuments launched its palace project. The most important tasks of preservation began in 1986 and were completed in the end of 1991. During this time the palace was partly emptied. By 1990 the Soviet troops left the southern wing, then the old people's home was closed down.

During this time the roof of the riding-hall and the stable-wing was reconstructed, the façade of the building was renovated, as well as the trussing of the central wings and the double cupola. Research was carried out in the archives and in the building, and thus the different building periods of the monument were defined. Painted walls and rooms were uncovered which revealed the splendour of the 18-19th centuries. Architectural structures were discovered, and so were the different structures of the park.

=== Reconstructed quarters ===
The utilisation of the main front wings of the palace was designed as a clear and well-developed architectural project. The first floor's 23 rooms (nearly 1000 sq. m.) accommodate the interior exhibition. The emphasis was laid on the revival of the atmosphere of the royal period and the introduction of the time of the Grassalkovich family.

Reconstruction is the principle of the interiors completed so far creating the state as it was around the 1880s. One of the most striking features of the Empress Elisabeth Exhibition is its historical accuracy.

The painted foyer and the Grand Hall on the first floor are also used for various programmes, with a link to the programme organisation and gastronomic activity unit on the ground floor.

Right before the double drive there is a car park for the visitors, suitable for 60 cars and 5 buses at a time. The visitor service units and the connected infrastructure are situated on the ground floor: cloak-room, ticket office, tourist information centre, toilets (also for the disabled), payphone, etc. Various retail units are found on the northern side: a souvenir centre, photo studio, while on the southern side there is a coffee shop and several function rooms. The northern front garden, at the main façade with its so-called Italian bastions and walkways was reconstructed with historical authenticity in 1998. The cheerful inner court is a resting place, where various outdoor programmes are held. The 26-hectare English park, which is open to the public every year, was declared a nature reserve in 1998. Its botanical curiosities are much appreciated by the visitors. Riding competitions are held in the park annually.

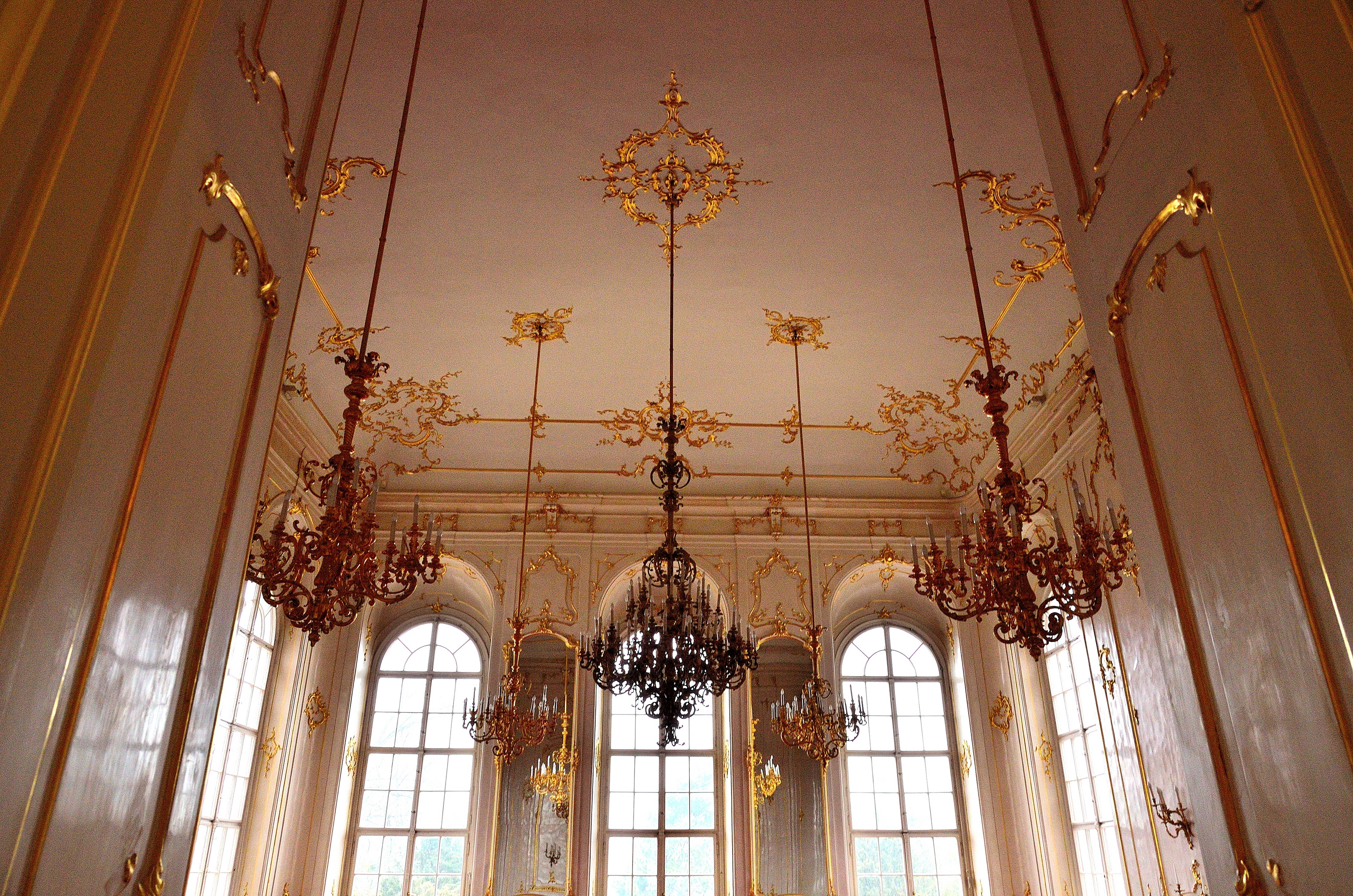
The Grand Hall

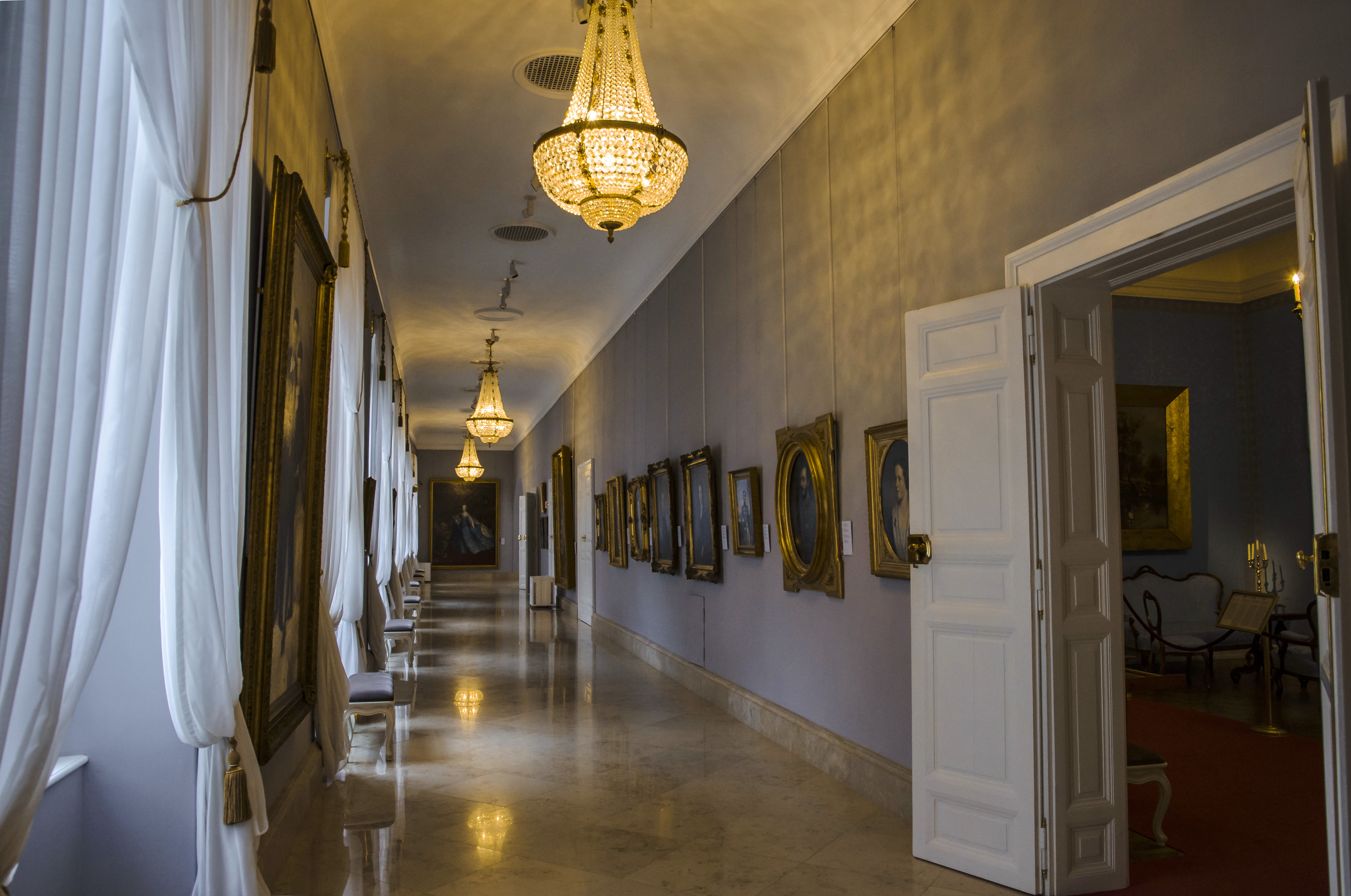
Mirror Corridor

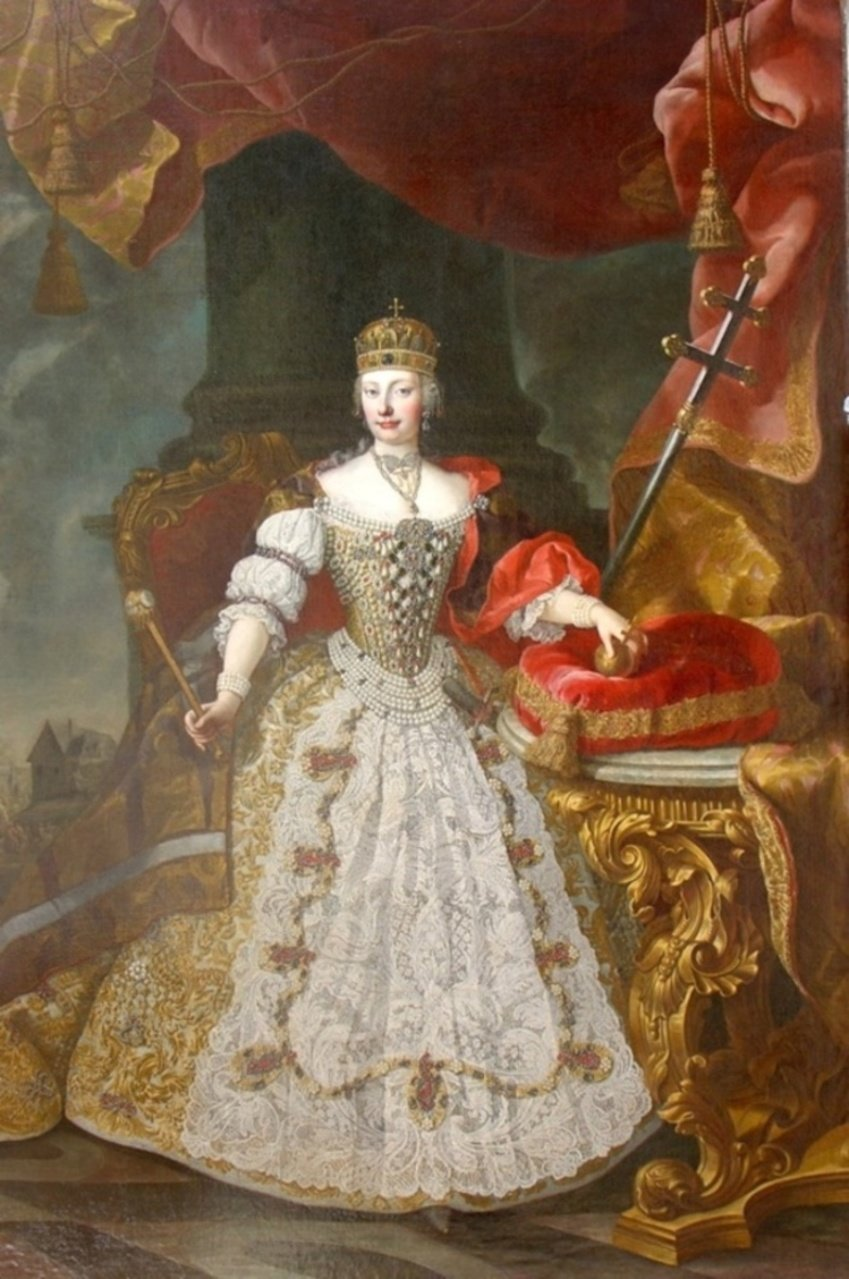
Maria Theresa as Hungarian Queen

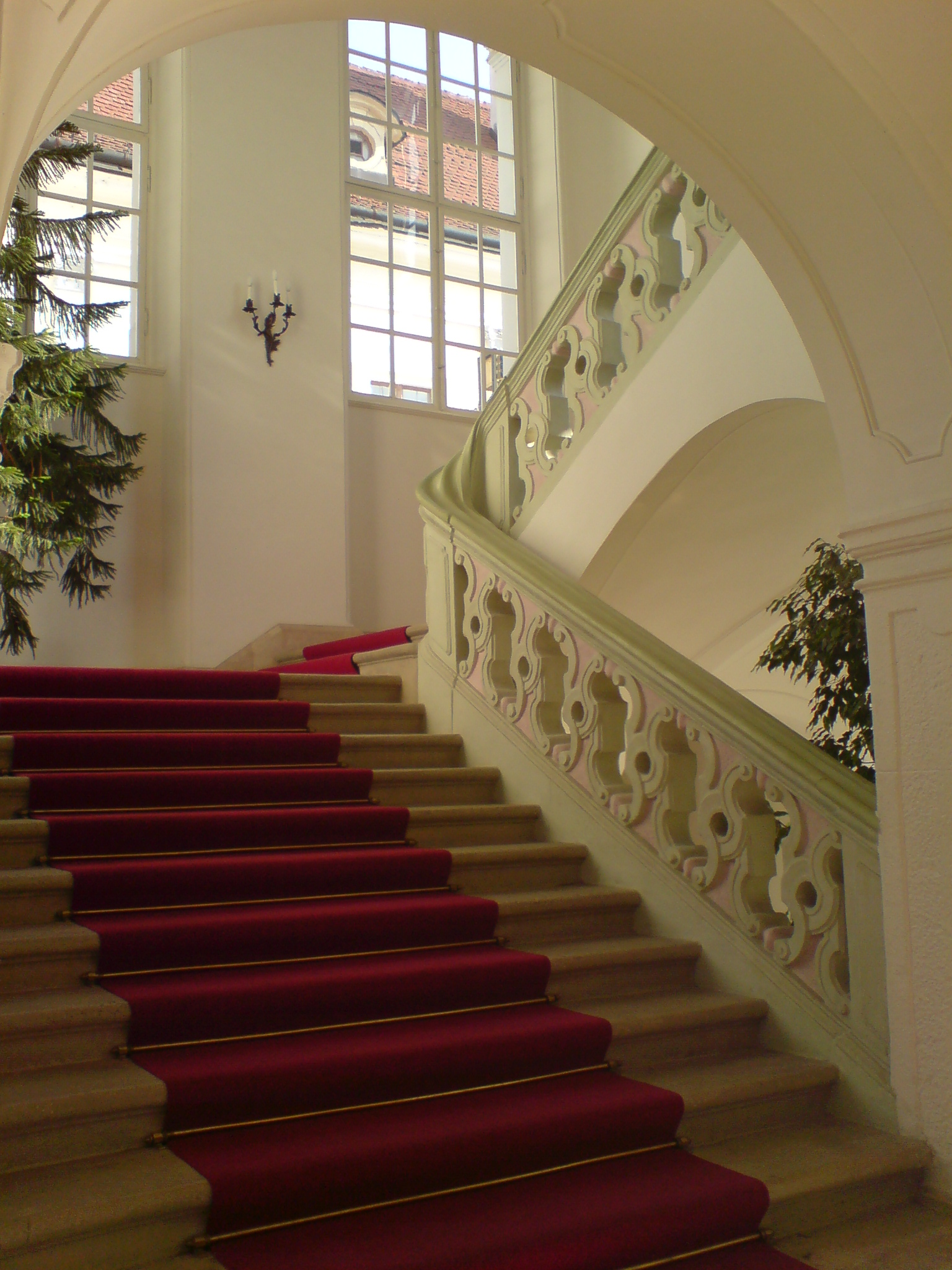
Main staircase in the palace

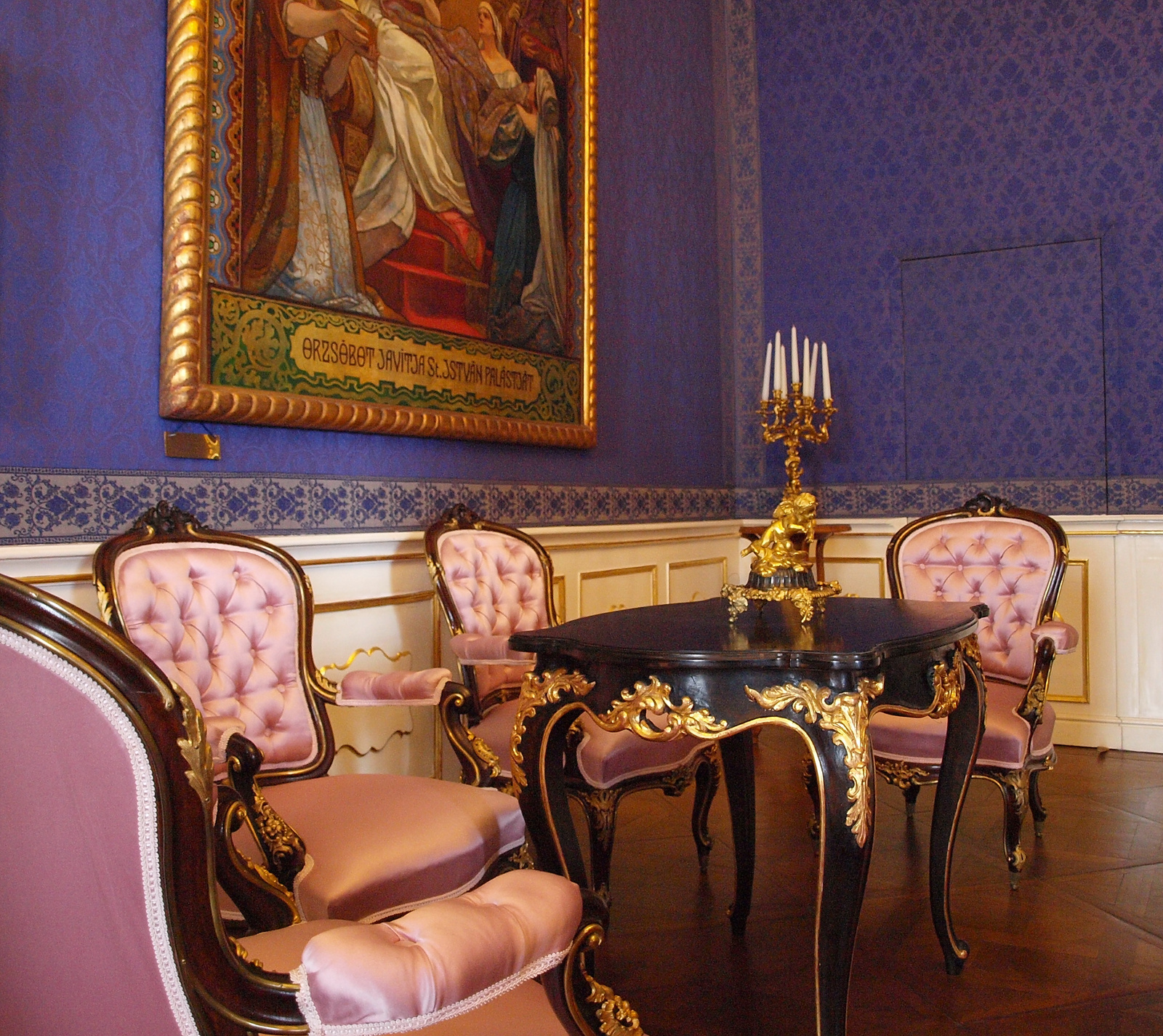
