= Bencze =

Bencze is a surname. Notable people with the surname include:

- János Bencze (1934–2014), Hungarian basketball player
- János Bencze (1952–1996), Hungarian footballer and goalkeeper
- Lajos Bencze (1918–1994), Hungarian wrestler
- Miklos Bencze (1911–1992), Hungarian-American bass singer
