= Antal Grassalkovich =

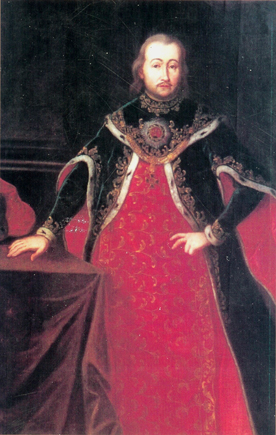
Antal Grassalkovich I, around 1760

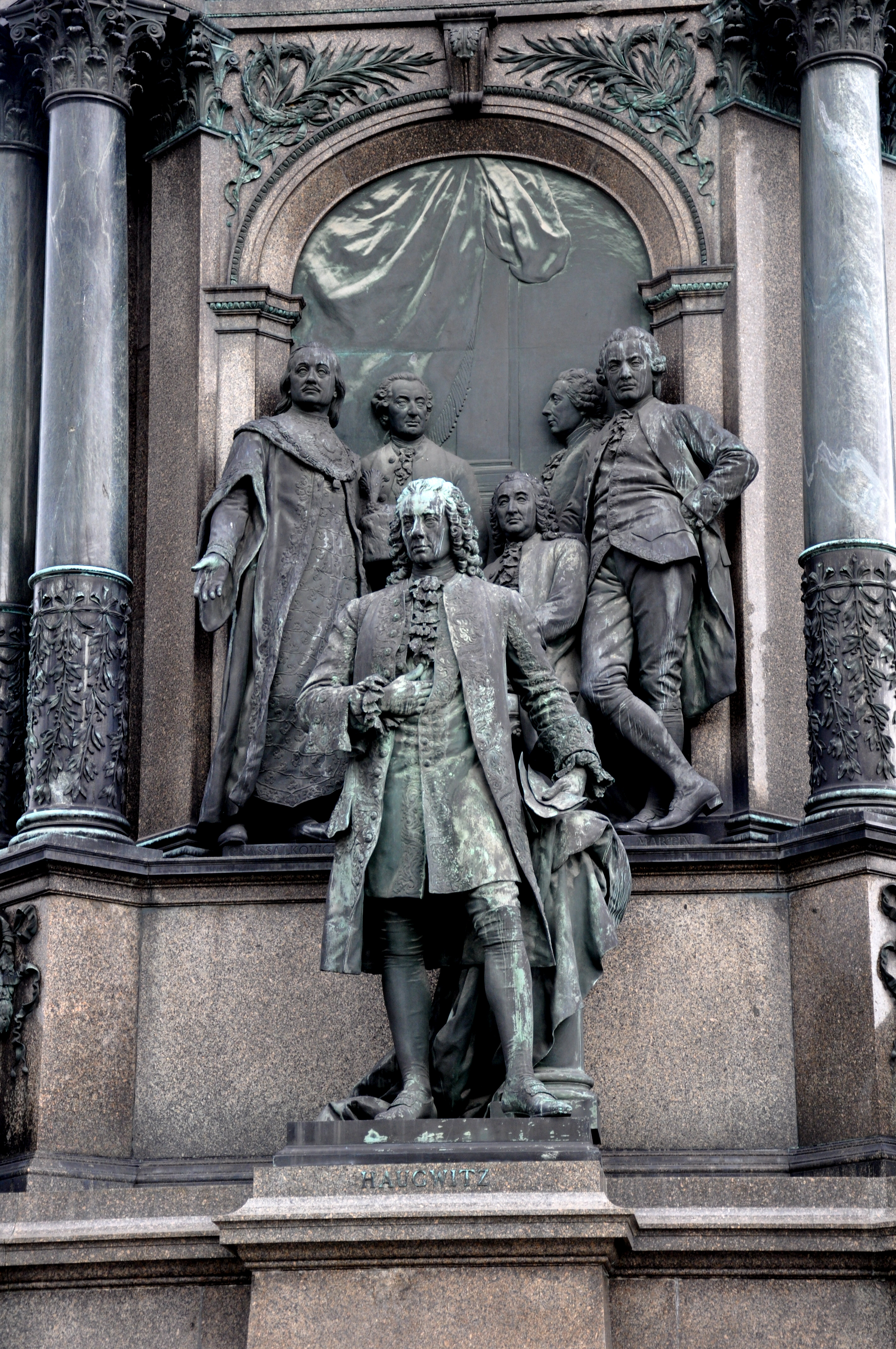
Maria Theresia Memorial (Administrators), on the left

Count Antal I "Anton" Grassalkovich de Gyarak (Ürmény, 6 March 1694 – Gödöllő, 1 December 1771) was an Imperial Real Privy Councilor, president of the Royal Hungarian Court Chamber, Chief Justice of Hungary (1731–1748), and confidant of Empress Maria Theresia.

== Early life ==
Grassalkovich was born in Ürmény on 6 March 1694 into a noble family of Croatian descent from the lower nobility in Beckov. He has been described as Croatian by ancestry, although Vlach or Morlach ancestry has also been claimed.

== Career ==
Grassalkovich was appointed Royal Prosecutor (Causarum Regalium Director) in 1720 and Chief Justice of Hungary (Personalis) in 1731. On 26 May 1732, he was made a baron. He gave up the office of advocate general when he succeeded Count Erdődy as president of the Hungarian Court Chamber in 1748, a position he held until his death. On 5 April 1743, he was raised to the rank of count.

The Grassalkovich era was characterized by the Court Chamber's systematic efforts to organize the immigration of people willing to settle beyond the southern and eastern borders of the Holy Roman Empire to colonize large parts of what was then Hungary. In connection with this, Grassalkovich acquired extensive estates in the Pest district and, in implementing these plans, rose from humble beginnings to become one of the richest men in Hungary. In the second half of the 18th century, Grassalkovich largely shaped the settlement and colonization policy of the Habsburg Empress Maria Theresia, of which he became a trusted advisor.

He had the Grassalkovich Palace in Bratislava built in 1760, as an impressive Rococo/Late Baroque summer palace with a French garden. The palace followed the model of the Royal Palace of Gödöllő, which was also built for Grassalkovich. Upon its completion, the Grassalkovich Palace was the focal point of the city's baroque music. Count Grassalkovich had his own orchestra, and his close relative Nikolaus I, Prince Esterházy, often sent him his personal composer Joseph Haydn, who premiered some of his works here. Numerous balls and festivities of the imperial court were also held in the palace.

Grassalkovich was depicted on the Maria-Theresia Memorial, as one of her most important administrators.

== Personal life ==
Count Grassalkovich was married three times and had five children, including:

- Count Antal II Grassalkovich (1734–1794), who married Countess Anna Maria Esterhazy von Galantha, a daughter of Nikolaus I, Prince Esterházy.
- Countess Maria Anna Grassalkovich (1760–1815), who married Count Mihály Viczay, a son of Count Ferenc Mihály Viczay and Countess Terézia Draskovich von Trakostjan in 1775.

Count Grassalkovich died at Gödöllő on 1 December 1771.

=== Descendants ===
Through his son Antal II, he was the grandfather of only one surviving grandson, Count Antal III Grassalkovich (1771–1841), who died without children. Also through Antal II, he was a grandfather of Countess Erzsébet Grassalkovich de Gyarak (1767–1823), who married her distant cousin, Count Ferenc Esterházy de Galántha (the only son of Count Ferenc Esterházy, the Ban of Croatia).

== Sources ==
- Grassalkovich Antal
- Genealogy
- Opac nevter
