= Jób Viczay =

Hungarian nobleman (1700-1734)

- Born: 13 March 1700; Beled, Kingdom of Hungary
- Died: 1734 (aged 34)

Count Jób Viczay de Loós et Hédervár (13 March 1700 – 1734) was a Hungarian nobleman, the first member of the Count Viczay de Loós et Hédervár family. He was received to title of Count by King Charles III (Holy Roman Emperor Charles VI) in 1723.

He was born in Beled to child of Baron Ádám de Loós and Baroness Erzsébet Perényi de Perény. Jób married Baroness Eszter Ebergényi de Ebergény et Telekes. They had six children: Borbála, László and Mihály (the latter's son was Mihály II), Anna Mária, Jozefa, Eszter.
