= Smiljevac, Serbia =

Smiljevac Смиљевац
- Village
- Location within Serbia
- Coordinates: 43°24′38″N 20°08′02″E
- Country: Serbia
- District: Moravica District
- Municipality: Ivanjica

Area
  - Total: 23.99 km^{2} (9.26 sq mi)

Population (2011)
  - Total: 116
  - Density: 4.84/km^{2} (12.5/sq mi)
- Time zone: UTC+1 (CET)
  - Summer (DST): UTC+2 (CEST)

Smiljevac is a village in the municipality of Ivanjica, Serbia. According to the 2011 census, the village has a population of 116 inhabitants.
