= Lajčo Budanović =

His Emminence Ljudevit Lajčo Budanović
- Apostolic Administrator of Bačka, Titular Bishop of Cisamus
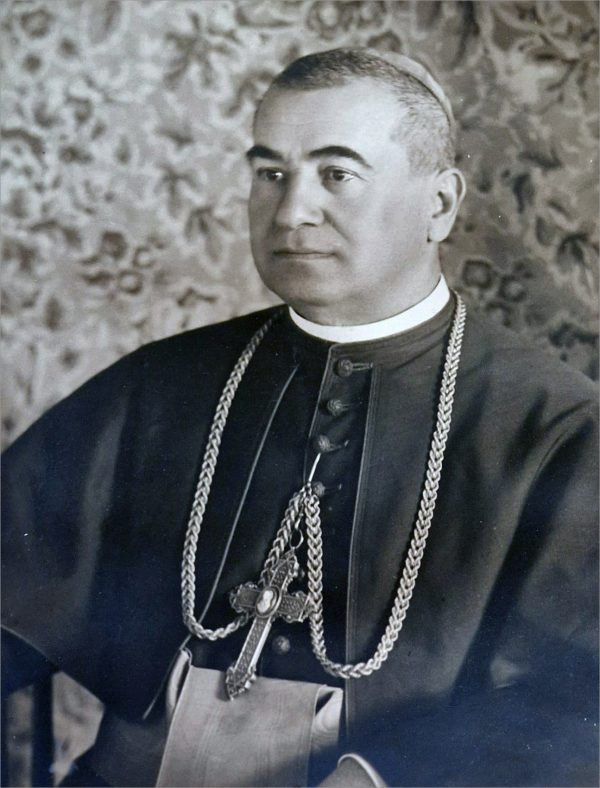
- Portait as bishop (1927).
- Church: Catholic Church

Orders
- Ordination: June 24, 1874
- Consecration: May 1, 1927 by Ermenegildo Pellegrinetti

Personal details
- Born: March 27, 1873 Bajmok
- Died: March 16, 1958 (aged 84) Subotica
- Denomination: Roman Catholic
- Residence: Subotica

Ljudevit Lajčo Budanović (27 March 1873 – 16 March 1958) was a Roman Catholic prelate, apostolic administrator of Bačka (1923–1958) and titular bishop of Cisamus (1927–1958). As an "enlightener of the Bačka Croats" (Croatian Encyclopedia), he compiled prayer books, collected their folk songs and recorded chants, wrote about the ikavica, the name and migrations of the Bunjevci Croats, founded the publishing companies "Alfa" and "Matica subotička", and was a co-founder of the Society of the Poor Bačka Sisters of Our Lady.
