= Bácsbokod =

Bácsbokod Bikić, Wikitsch
- Large village
- Coat of arms
- Interactive map of Bácsbokod
- Location of Bácsbokod in Hungary
- Coordinates: 46°07′19″N 19°09′32″E
- Country: Hungary
- County: Bács-Kiskun
- District: Bácsalmás

Area
  - Total: 63.93 km^{2} (24.68 sq mi)

Population (2015)
  - Total: 2,567
  - Density: 40.15/km^{2} (104.0/sq mi)
- Time zone: UTC+1 (CET)
  - Summer (DST): UTC+2 (CEST)
- Postal code: 6453
- Area code: (+36) 79

Bácsbokod (Croatian: Bikić; German: Wikitsch) is a large village and municipality in Bács-Kiskun County, in the Southern Great Plain region of southern Hungary. The Danube River (River Duna) flows 20 kilometers to the west of the village.

== History ==
At the end of the 19th century and the beginning of the 20th century, Jews lived in Bácsbokod. In 1910, 29 Jews lived in Bácsbokod, Some of them were murdered in the Holocaust.

== Geography ==
It covers an area of 63.93 km^{2} (25 sq mi) and has a population of about 3101 people.

== Demography ==
Existing ethnicities:

- Magyars – 97%
- Germans – 2%
- Croats – 0.68%
- Serbs, Romani, Bunjevci other – 0.32%
