= Bajmok =

Bajmok Бајмок (Serbian) Bajmok (Hungarian)
- Village (Selo)
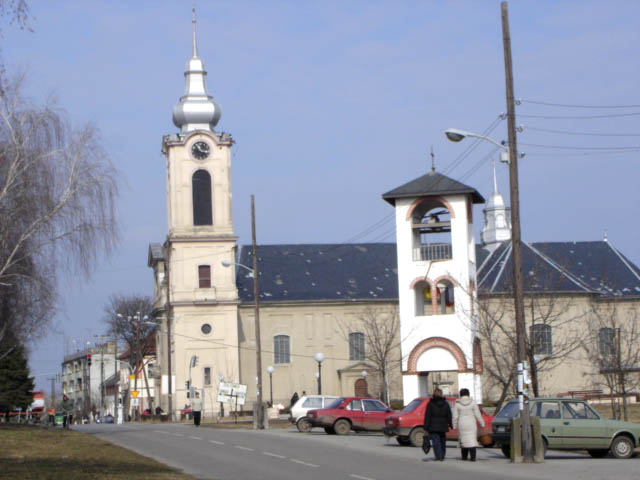
- Street in Bajmok, the Catholic Church (right), and bell-tower of the Orthodox church (left)

- Coat of arms

- Location within Vojvodina Location within Serbia Location within Europe
- Coordinates: 45°58′N 19°25′E
- Country: Serbia
- Province: Vojvodina
- District: North Bačka District
- Municipality: Subotica

Area
  - Total: 120.57 km^{2} (46.55 sq mi)
- Elevation: 144 m (472 ft)

Population (2022)
  - Total: 6,093
  - Density: 50.53/km^{2} (130.9/sq mi)
- Time zone: UTC+1 (CET)
  - Summer (DST): UTC+2 (CEST)

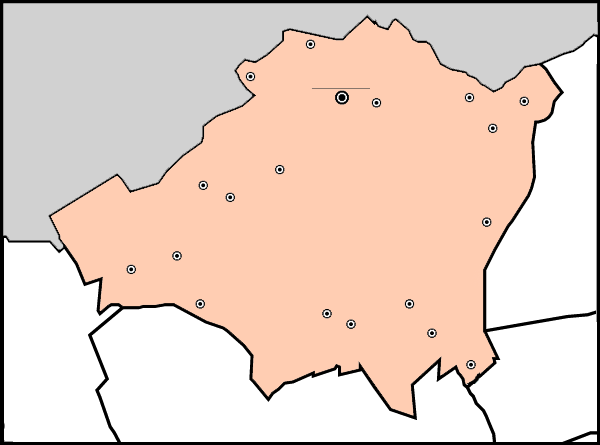

Bajmok (Serbian Cyrillic: Бајмок; Hungarian: Bajmok, pronounced [ˈbɒjmok]) is a village located in the administrative area of the City of Subotica, North Bačka District, Vojvodina, Serbia. The village has a population of 6,093 inhabitants (2022 census).

== Name ==
In Serbian Cyrillic the village is known as Бајмок, in Serbian Latin as Bajmok, in Hungarian as Bajmok, in Bunjevac as Bajmok or Bajmak, in Croatian as Bajmak (since 2009) or Bajmok (before 2009), and in German as Nagelsdorf.

== History ==
The first written documents relating to Bajmok came from the fifteenth century. Then the village was for the first time officially mentioned as a village. King Matthias gave it to his mother, Erzsébet Szilágyi. The deed of donation was confirmed on 16 February 1462.

During Ottoman administration (16th-17th century), two villages with this name were mentioned: Bajmok and Novi Bajmok. Both villages had about 20 houses.

Between 1770 and 1785 new colonists came, mainly Bunjevci and Hungarians. At the time of the Hungarian revolution, in the fields of this village there was a conflict between the Hungarian and the Vojvodinian Serb army, won by the Hungarians (but later lost the war). The Hungarian rebel army from Subotica repressed the Serbian villagers, many Serbs were shot and executed even without a trial.

In 1910, population of the village was mainly composed of Hungarians, Bunjevci, Germans, and Serbs.

After World War I, new Serb settlers came to the village. During the Second World War, this village was under the Hungarian fascist occupation. Many of the citizens were exiled from their homes (mainly Serbs) to make room for Hungarian Csango colonists. Bajmok was liberated from the Hungarian fascists on 19 October 1944.

After World War II, 2,090 settlers came in Bajmok, which enlarged village population to 11,789.

Until 1991, the largest ethnic group in the village were Hungarians. By the 2002 census, Serbs were listed as the single largest ethnic group in Bajmok.

== Demographics ==
=== Historical population ===
- 1948: 11,188
- 1953: 10,829
- 1961: 11,117
- 1971: 10,307
- 1981: 9,856
- 1991: 8,620
- 2002: 8,586
- 2011: 7,414
- 2022: 6,093

=== Ethnic groups ===
According to data from the 2022 census, ethnic groups in the village include:

- 2,127 (34.9%) Serbs
- 1,487 (24.4%) Hungarians
- 784 (12.8%) Bunjevci
- 325 (5.3%) Croats
- Others/Undeclared/Unknown

== Notable people ==
- Lajčo Budanović, Catholic bishop

== See also ==
- List of places in Serbia
- List of cities, towns and villages in Vojvodina
