= Mátételke =

- Seal

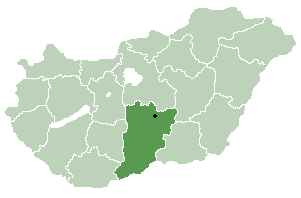
- Location of Bács-Kiskun county in Hungary

- Location of Mátételke, Hungary
- Coordinates: 46°09′39″N 19°16′48″E
- Country: Hungary
- County: Bács-Kiskun

Government
  - Type: Mayor-council government
  - Mayor: Berki Erika Nagyné (Ind.)

Area
  - Total: 27.93 km^{2} (10.78 sq mi)

Population (2025)
  - Total: 508
  - Density: 18.2/km^{2} (47.1/sq mi)
- Time zone: UTC+1 (CET)
  - Summer (DST): UTC+2 (CEST)
- Postal code: 6452
- Area code: 79
- Website: www.matetelke.hu

Mátételke (Croatian: Matević) is a village in Bács-Kiskun county, in the Southern Great Plain region of southern Hungary. It is part of Bácsalmási kistérség.

== Geography ==
It covers an area of 27.93 km^{2} (11 sq mi) and has a population of 483 people (2018).

== Demographics ==
Existing ethnicities:

- (Hungary) Magyars
- (Serbia) Bunjevci
