= Éva Viczay =

Hungarian noblewoman (1602-1651)

- Baroness of Galántha
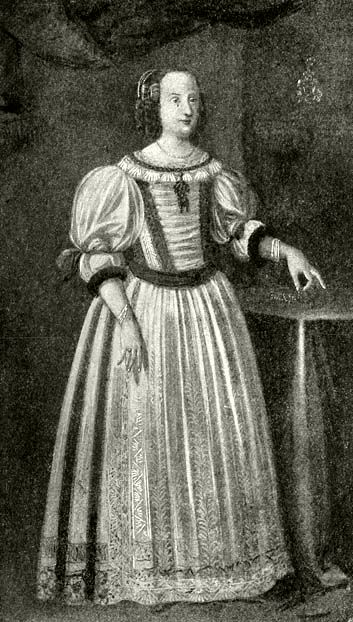
- Full name: Éva Viczay de Loós
- Born: 1602; Sopron, Kingdom of Hungary
- Died: 28 July 1651 (aged 48–49); Galántha, Kingdom of Hungary (today: Galanta, Slovakia)
- Noble family: House of Viczay; House of Esterházy
- Spouse: Baron Pál Esterházy de Galántha
- Issue: See below for issue
- Father: Sándor Viczay de Loós
- Mother: Orsolya Hagymássy de Szentgiróth et Beregszó

Éva Viczay de Loós (1602 – 28 July 1651) was a Hungarian noblewoman, the second wife of Baron Pál Esterházy de Galántha, who was the founder of the Zólyom branch of the House of Esterházy. Her brother was Baron Ádám Viczay de Loós.

== Family ==
They married on 1 August 1625 in Sopron, four years after that her husband's first wife, Zsuzsanna Károlyi died. The marriage produced the following children:

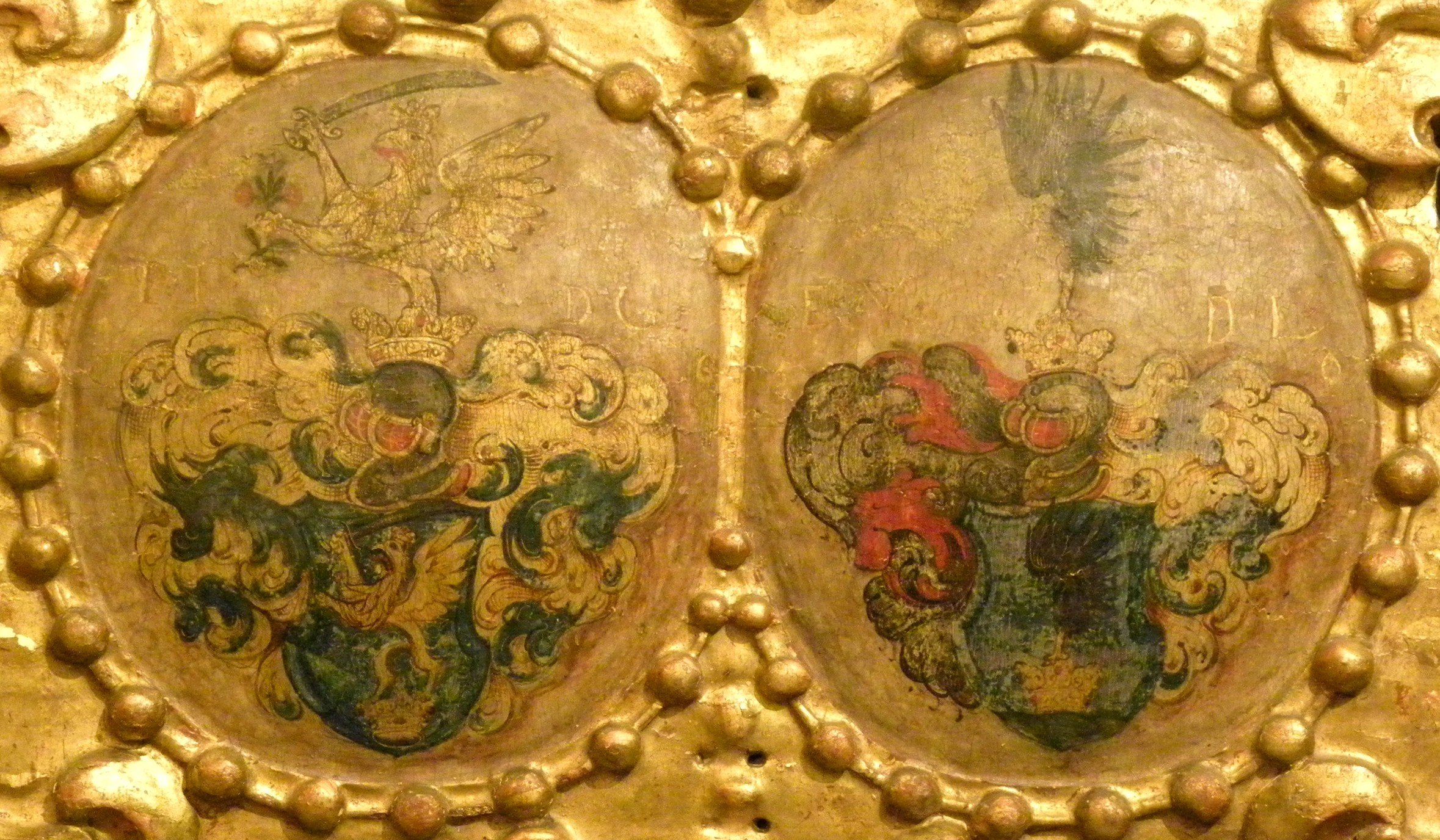
Coat of arms of Baron Pál and Éva Viczay (Slovak National Gallery, Bratislava)

- Emenne (1626–1631), died young
- Rebeka (1631 – after 16 June 1647)
- Zsófia (1633 – 20 March 1688), married to Baron György Berényi de Karancsberény (1601–1677) in 1650
- Miklós (1634 – 19 August 1688), Ispán (Count; comes) of Zólyom County, castellan of Buják
- Magdolna (1635–1708)
- Sándor (1636 – 2 April 1681), heir of the Zólyom lordships
- Ilona (1638 – 26 September 1651), died young
- Gábor (d. before 1653)
- Péter (d. before 1653)
- Dániel (d. before 1653)
