= Ádám Viczay =

Hungarian nobleman

- Spouses: Zsuzsanna Török de Telekes; Katalin Körtvélyessy
- Children: János; Mária; Orsolya
- Parent(s): Sándor Viczay de Loós; Orsolya Hagymássy de Szentgiróth et Beregszó

Baron Ádám Viczay de Loós was a Hungarian nobleman, member of the Baron Viczay de Loós family.

His parents were Sándor Viczay de Loós and Orsolya Hagymássy de Szentgiróth and Beregszó. He had three younger sisters, including Éva, second wife of Baron Pál Esterházy. Ádám was created Baron by Ferdinand III on 15 May 1645.

Baron Ádám married twice: his first wife was Zsuzsanna Török de Telekes, the second one was Katalin Körtvélyessy. He had three children, János, Mária and Orsolya. János established the family wealth with the inheriting of the Hédervári estate.
