= Katymár =

Katymár Kaćmar, Katschmar
- Csikéria
- Coordinates: 46.0322°N 19.2108°E
- Country: Hungary
- County: Bács-Kiskun

Area
  - Total: 71.08 km^{2} (27.44 sq mi)

Population (2015)
  - Total: 1,843
  - Density: 25.9/km^{2} (67/sq mi)
- Time zone: UTC+1 (CET)
  - Summer (DST): UTC+2 (CEST)
- Postal code: 6455
- Area code: 79

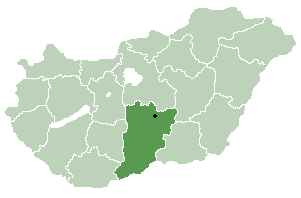
Location of Bács-Kiskun county in Hungary

Katymár (Croatian: Kaćmar; German: Katschmar or Schanzmark; Bunjevac: Kaćmar) is a village in Bács-Kiskun County, in the Southern Great Plain region of southern Hungary.

== Geography ==
It covers an area of 71.08 km^{2} (27 sq mi) and has a population of 1843 people (2015).

== Notable persons ==
Notable persons born in Katymár:

- Mijo Mandić, Croatian writer (in Hungarian texts: Mándity Mihály)
- Ivan Petreš Čudomil, Croatian writer
- Prof. Dr. József Krékits, professor emeritus, linguist

Notable persons that lived and worked in Katymár:

- Lajčo Budanović, bishop
