= Bácsalmás =

Bácsalmás Aljmaš, Almasch
- Town
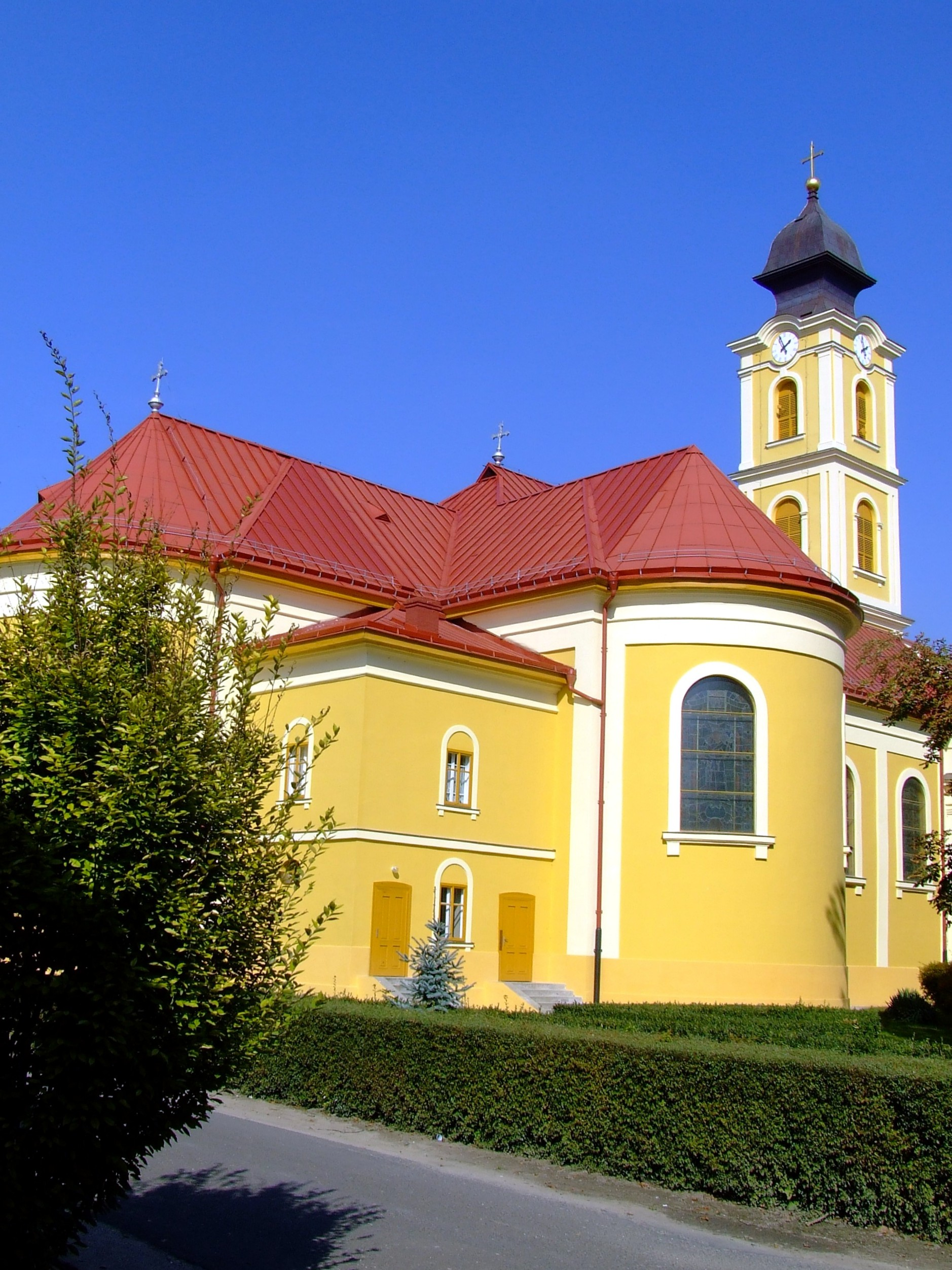
- Church of the Holy Cross

- Flag Coat of arms

- Location within Hungary
- Coordinates: 46.12393°N 19.32630°E
- Country: Hungary
- County: Bács-Kiskun
- District: Bácsalmás

Area
  - Total: 108.32 km^{2} (41.82 sq mi)

Population (2008)
  - Total: 7,190
  - Density: 70.32/km^{2} (182.1/sq mi)
- Time zone: UTC+1 (CET)
  - Summer (DST): UTC+2 (CEST)
- Postal code: 6430
- Area code: (+36) 79
- Website: www.bacsalmas.hu

Bácsalmás (Croatian: Aljmaš or Bačaljmaš; German: Almasch; Serbian: Аљмаш, romanized: Aljmaš) is a small town in southern Hungary in the region of Bácska (Bács-Kiskun County) close to the border with the Vojvodina region of Serbia, with a population of 7,694 people.

== History ==
In the Middle Ages, the region came under the control of the Magyars who absorbed the Slavic and the remnant Avar population. There was archaeological evidence found in various small villages in the Middle Ages. The area was under the ownership of János Hunyadi in the 15th century. With the arrival of the Turks, the population disappeared and was at first replaced by Bunjevci who came from Bosnia and the Croatian Littoral. The first mention the village comes from 1543 in the records of the Archbishopric of Kalocsa.

In the 17th century, there was a steady influx of Bunjevci under the leadership of the Franciscans from Bosnia. The last major group came under the leadership of captains Marković and Vidaković.

With the Turkish defeat at the 1697 Battle of Zenta, Bácsalmás came under the control of the Habsburgs where it became a part of the Military Frontier.

In 1772, the village received an Urbarium form in the Bunjevac language, which reflected the majority of the population. The Urbarium was for the landowners of the village consisting of 72 Bunjevci, 11 Hungarians, 3 Slovaks and 2 Romani.

In the 1780s, 195 German families were settled by the Habsburgs in Bácsalmás, who continued to be the overwhelming majority until 1945. Most of these settlers came from Swabia, Alsace and Mainz. In the following decade, land grants were given to newly ennobled men from the immediate region to the Hungarian family of Németszeghy, Koronay, and Bunjevac families of Antunović, Rudić, Kovačić, and Šišković.

In 1786, the Croatian toponym Smilyevácz (Smiljevac) was recorded in the area of the village, now known as Bácsalmási tanyák, in addition to other such hamlets in the area such as Duboka / Doboka and Halmoš / Óalmas.

In the 19th century the town became a centre for wine and grain production which was exported mainly to Austria and Bohemia. It also became an important railroad junction. In effect it became a prosperous community. However, it retained its rural character the whole time with a strong artisan class which served the surrounding region.

In 1941, the town had a population of 13,000, two-thirds of whom were Germans (Danube Swabians). In 1945–46, the majority of Germans were expelled and Hungarians were brought from Slovakia to replace them.

In 1986, Bácsalmás became a town with a population of over 8,000. With the closure of some industries and the reforms in agriculture, the town is losing its population. Bácsalmás is struggling to replace the declining agricultural sector, but alternatives are hard to find. The farming cooperative privatized in the early 1990s and the local state farm accumulated large debts.

== Twin towns – sister cities ==
Bácsalmás is twinned with:

- Backnang, Germany
- Bajmok (Subotica), Serbia
- Bezdan (Sombor), Serbia
- Bizovac, Croatia
- Borsec, Romania
- Gizałki, Poland
- Veľký Meder, Slovakia
