= Tataháza =

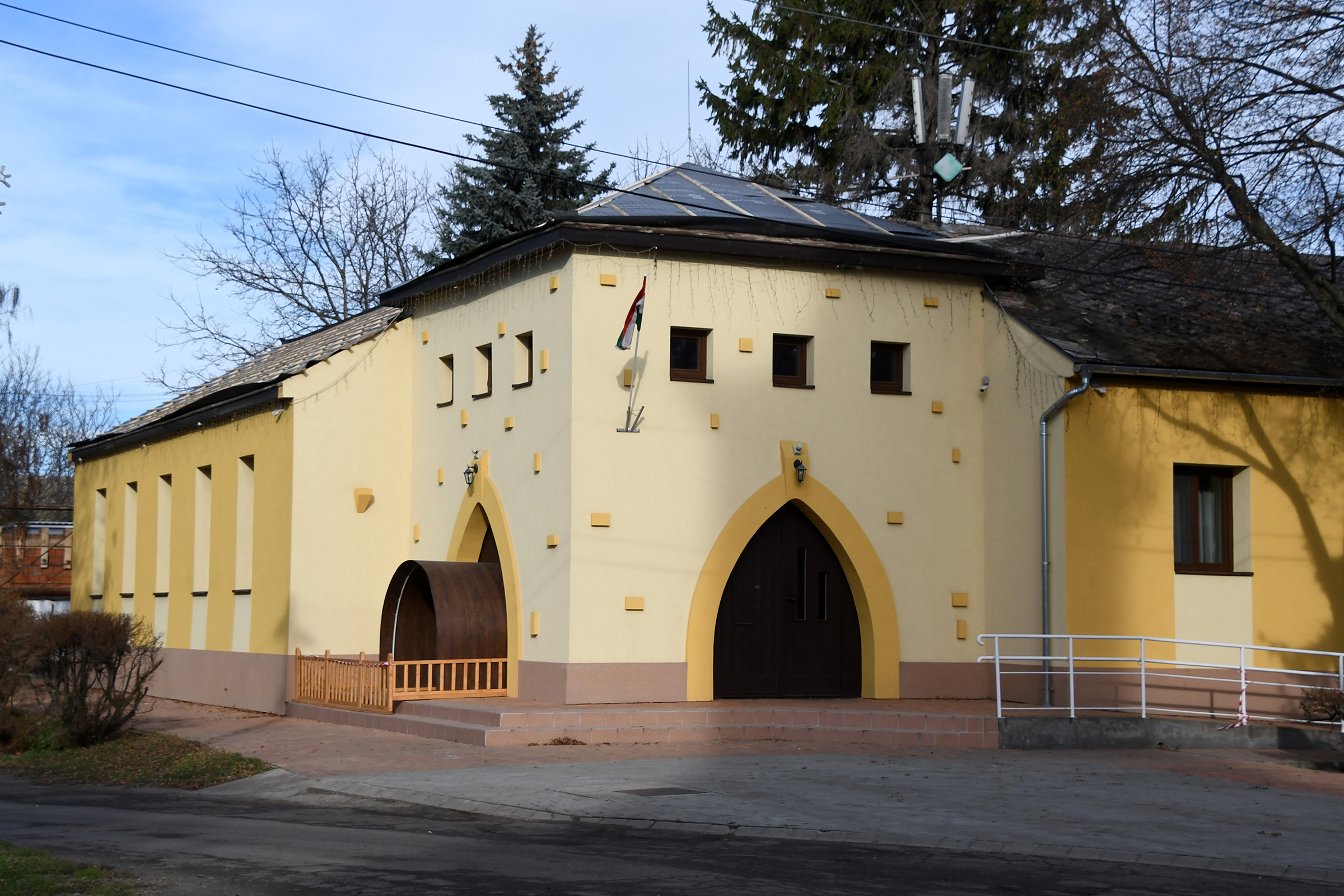
- Village hall

- Tataháza
- Coordinates: 46.1742°N 19.3061°E
- Country: Hungary
- County: Bács-Kiskun

Government
  - Type: Mayor-council government
  - Mayor: István Vörös (Ind.)

Area
  - Total: 26.10 km^{2} (10.08 sq mi)

Population (2018)
  - Total: 1,151
  - Density: 44.10/km^{2} (114.2/sq mi)
- Time zone: UTC+1 (CET)
  - Summer (DST): UTC+2 (CEST)
- Postal code: 6451
- Area code: 79

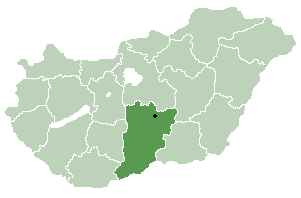
Location of Bács-Kiskun county in Hungary

Tataháza (Croatian: Tataza) is a village in Bács-Kiskun county, in the Southern Great Plain region of southern Hungary.

== Geography ==
It covers an area of 26.10 km^{2} (10 sq mi) and has a population of 1,151 people (2018).

== Demography ==
Magyars and small community of Croats.

A Jewish community lived in the village, until the Holocaust of the Hungarian Jews, some of them were murdered and the community disintegrated.
