= Héder Viczay =

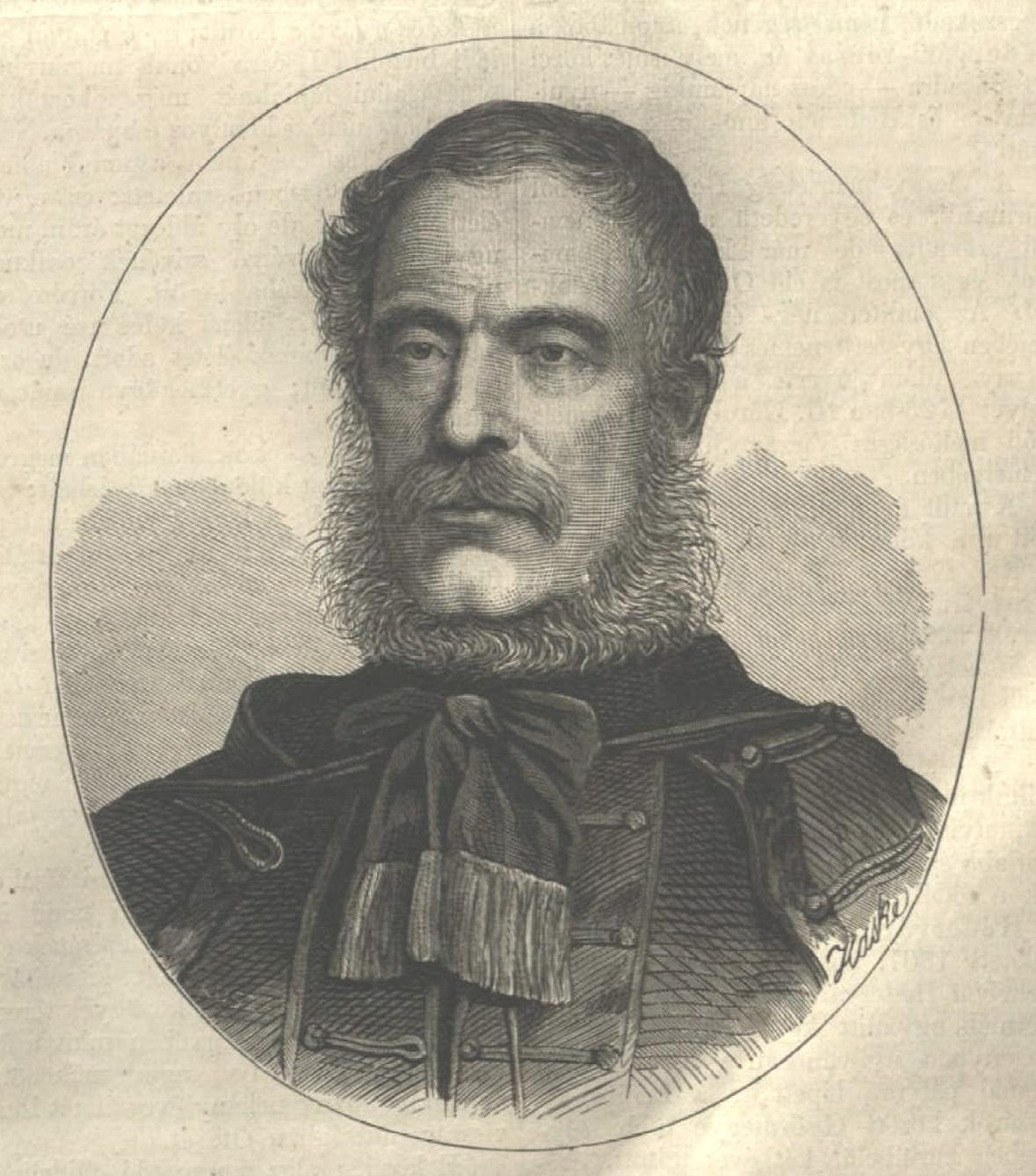
- Born: 2 August 1807; Hédervár, Kingdom of Hungary
- Died: 23 December 1873 (aged 66); Hédervár, Austria-Hungary
- Occupations: traveler, archaeologist

Count Héder Viczay de Loós et Hédervár (2 August 1807 – 23 December 1873) was a Hungarian traveler, amateur archaeologist, collector, Imperial and Royal Privy Councillor. He was the last member of the old noble Viczay family.

== Background ==
His parents were Count Ferenc Viczay, an Imperial and Royal Chamberlain and Countess Amália Zichy de Zich et Vásonkeő. He had three siblings:

- Károly (1802–1867): Imperial and Royal Privy Councillor, he married Mária Khuen, aunt of later Prime Minister Károly Khuen-Héderváry, in 1829.
- Adolf (1804–1873): uhlan captain, his wife was Leokádia Anasztázia Lichnovszky since 1837.
- Antónia (1812–1903): Her first husband was Count Pál Esterházy (1806–1857), the second was Adolf Mengen, an Imperial and Royal Major General.
