= Hédervár =

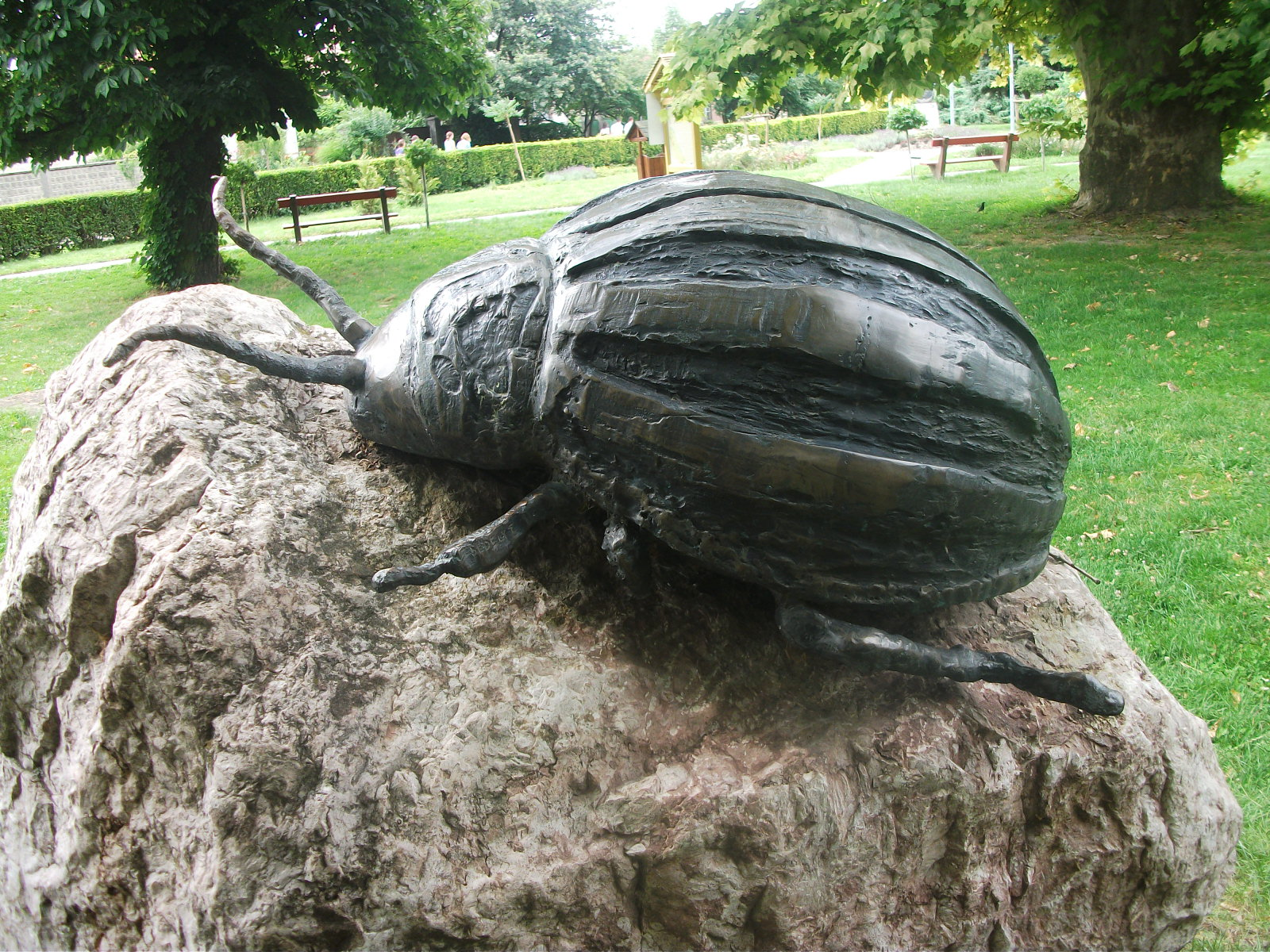
- Colorado potato beetle statue

- Coat of arms

- Location of Győr-Moson-Sopron county in Hungary

- Location of Hédervár
- Coordinates: 47.83243°N 17.45604°E
- Country: Hungary
- County: Győr-Moson-Sopron

Area
  - Total: 14.28 km^{2} (5.51 sq mi)

Population (2004)
  - Total: 1,127
  - Density: 78.92/km^{2} (204.4/sq mi)
- Time zone: UTC+1 (CET)
  - Summer (DST): UTC+2 (CEST)
- Postal code: 9178
- Area code: 96

Hédervár is a village located in Győr-Moson-Sopron County, in northwestern Hungary.

== Description ==
The village settled in the Szigetköz in Győr-Moson-Sopron country halfway along the road connecting Győr and Mosonmagyaróvár. Its emergence can be associated with the German Héder – the founder of the Héderváry family – moving to Hungary. It was first mentioned in a charter in 1210.

In spite of the relatively late written mention it is certain that it had been a village centuries before. It may have been the only village in the Szigetköz, which has survived at its original location in the Arpadian age.

The Héderváry family established a family centre on the so-called “Jewish hill” as early as in the 13th century. It started to flourish at an early time, and its castle was also further extended, and the “Boldogasszony” chapel (Blessed Virgin), its family funeral place was also built in the first half of the following century. A charter issued in 1443 already recorded the settlement as on oppidum.

Favourable development was halted by the appearance of the Turks in Hungary. The situation of the oppidum was further worsened by the borrowings of the Héderváry family, and also by the fact that Lőrinc, the Ban of Nándorfehérvár left the fortress during the Turkish siege of 1521.

This was coupled by the fact that the family did not recognize the political power structures in Western Transdanubia, and during the pretenders’ struggle for the throne, trey supported the loser János Szapolyai against Ferdinand I, Holy Roman Emperor. Their series of bad decisions resulted in the loss of their estates and also Hédervár in Szigetköz. Their properties were given to the Bakics family from Serbia.

The first thing the new owners did was to ruin the centre of the Héderváry family, and to forcefully spread the new faith of the Protestant religion.

The settlement suffered a terrible blow by the unsuccessful Siege of Vienna by the Turks in 1529. After their retreat, Lőrinc Héderváry, who supported the wrong side, was captured, and could only regain his estates with the support of his lord, Ferdinánd I. After he was freed in 1535, he immediately set about reconstructing the Héderváry family's centre, and the castle was completed in 1578.

The resettlement of the estate could only become successful by the joint efforts of the Héderváry, Révay and Czobor families after 1600.

After the resettlement, the settlement was further afflicted by the plundering Haiduks, and Germans, the second lost campaign of the Turks in the 1683 Battle of Vienna, the floods of the Danube, and the epidemics.

Its situation at the time was further aggravated by the forceful Counter-Reformation. István Héderváry strengthened the castle in 1643, and the palatine once again endowed the privilege of an oppidum upon the settlement.

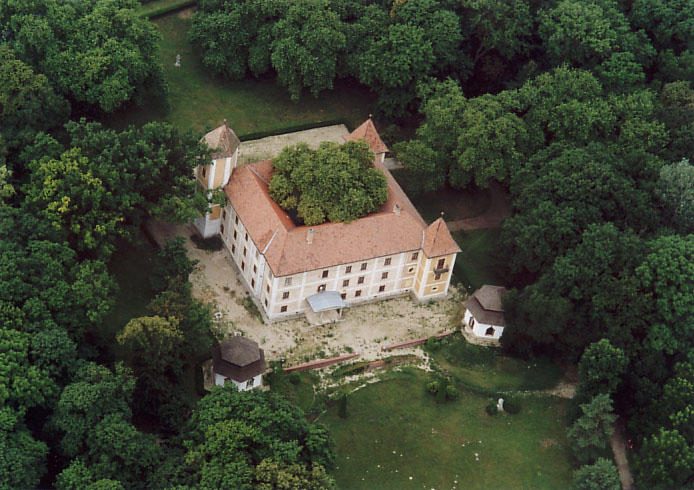
Aerial photography: Hédervár, palace

After the extinction of the male line of the Héderváry family, Katalin Héderváry received the rights of a male heir, and the estate fell into the hands of the Viczay-Héderváry family. The 18th century brought along reconstruction in the life of the oppidum. The castle was reconstructed intro a chateaux, and a beautiful park was created around it. The number of the population increased.

From 1983 to 1997, the chateaux gave home for artists (sculpture, painters) creating house. At present, the building is the property of Hungarian Creative Artist Public Foundation, and is functioning as a Hotel.

== Castle Hotel Hédervár ==
Castle Hotel Hedervar is located between Györ and Mosonmagyarovar. The castle hotel offers a renaissance atmosphere. The castle hotel can be easily reached from Vienna, Bratislava and from Budapest on the M1 motorway.
