= János Bencze (footballer) =

Hungarian footballer (1952–1996)

Personal information
- Date of birth: 1952
- Place of birth: Hungary
- Date of death: 13 April 1996 (aged 43–44)
- Place of death: Hungary
- Position: Goalkeeper

Senior career*
Years	Team	Apps	(Gls)
1970–1971	Diósgyőri VTK	11 (0)	
1971–1977	Szegedi EOL	16 (0)	
- * Club domestic league appearances and goals

János Bencze (1952 – 13 April 1996) was a Hungarian footballer, goalkeeper.

== Career ==
He played at Diósgyőri VTK between 1970 and 1971. His first match at the Division I was against Újpesti Dózsa on 26 April 1970. From 1971 to 1977 he played at Szegedi EOL of Szeged. He was a goalkeeper on 27 matches.

== Sources ==
- János Bencze at Hungarian Football Database
