= Bácsborsód =

- Flag Coat of arms

- Location of Bácsborsód in Hungary
- Coordinates: 46.09430°N 19.15902°E
- Country: Hungary
- Region: Southern Great Plain
- County: Bács-Kiskun
- Subregion: Bajai
- Rank: Village

Area
  - Total: 77.52 km^{2} (29.93 sq mi)

Population (1 January 2008)
  - Total: 1,245
  - Density: 16.06/km^{2} (41.60/sq mi)
- Time zone: UTC+1 (CET)
  - Summer (DST): UTC+2 (CEST)
- Postal code: 6454
- Area code: +36 79
- KSH code: 27234
- Website: www.bacsborsod.hu

Bácsborsód (German: Borschod, Croatian: Boršot) is a large village and municipality in Bács-Kiskun county, in the Southern Great Plain region of southern Hungary.

Until 1941, a small community of Jews lived in the village. After the Holocaust of the Hungarian Jews there were no Jews left in the village.

== Geography ==
It covers an area of 72.52 km^{2} and has a population of 1287 people.
