= Index of Bács-Kiskun-related articles =

This is a list of articles that have something substantive to do with the county of Bács-Kiskun.

== See also ==
- List of cities, towns, and villages in Bács-Kiskun county
- List of people from Bács-Kiskun
- List of Soltvadkert Mayors

== B ==
- Baja
- Bácsalmás
- Bács-Bodrog
- József Bayer

== D ==
- Dunavecse
- Danube
- Danube-Kris-Mures-Tisza

== E ==
- Jenő Ernst

== G ==
- András Gáspár
- Great Hungarian Plain

== I ==
- Izsák

== J ==
- Jánoshalma

== K ==
- Kecel
- Kecskemét
- Kerekegyháza
- Kiskunság National Park
- Kiskunfélegyháza
- Kiskunhalas
- Kalocsa
- Kiskőrös
- Kiskunmajsa
- Kunszentmiklós

== L ==
- Lajosmizse
- Lake Szelid
- Lake Vadkert

== M ==
- Béla Magyari
- Lázár Mészáros
- Dezső Miskolczy
- Ferenc Móra

== P ==
- Pest-Pilis-Solt-Kiskun
- Sándor Petőfi
- Puszta

== S ==
- Solt
- Soltvadkert
- Szabadszállás

== T ==
- Tisza
- Tiszakécske
- Tompa
