= Danube–Tisza Interfluve =

Geographical region of Hungary and Serbia

The Danube–Tisza Interfluve is the landscape in the Pannonian Basin between the Danube and Tisza rivers, east of Transdanubia. It covers a large part of the Great Hungarian Plain.

== Geography ==
Its borders are Danube (west), Tisza (east), and Fruška Gora (Tarcal Mountain) (south). Its northeastern border is Rétköz small-landscape in Szabolcs–Szatmár–Bereg County.

The largest green area is the Kiskunság National Park. Avocets, geese and black-winged stilts nest in the area. The lakes provide a temporary home for tens of thousands of migratory birds. This ornithologist paradise is also a UNESCO biosphere reserve. Lake Szelid near Kalocsa, Lake Vadkert by Soltvadkert, Lake Kunfehér and Lake Sós at Kiskunhalas are ideal spots for bathing and camping.

== Cities in Hungary ==
- Budapest (17 districts out of 23)
- Kecskemét
- Szeged
- Szolnok
- Eger
- Miskolc

== Cities in Serbia ==
- Novi Sad (Újvidék)
- Subotica (Szabadka)
- Sombor (Zombor)

== See also ==
- Kiskunság National Park
