= Kiskunság National Park =

National park of Hungary

Coordinates: 46°53′N 19°24′E

Kiskunság National park
- IUCN category II (national park)
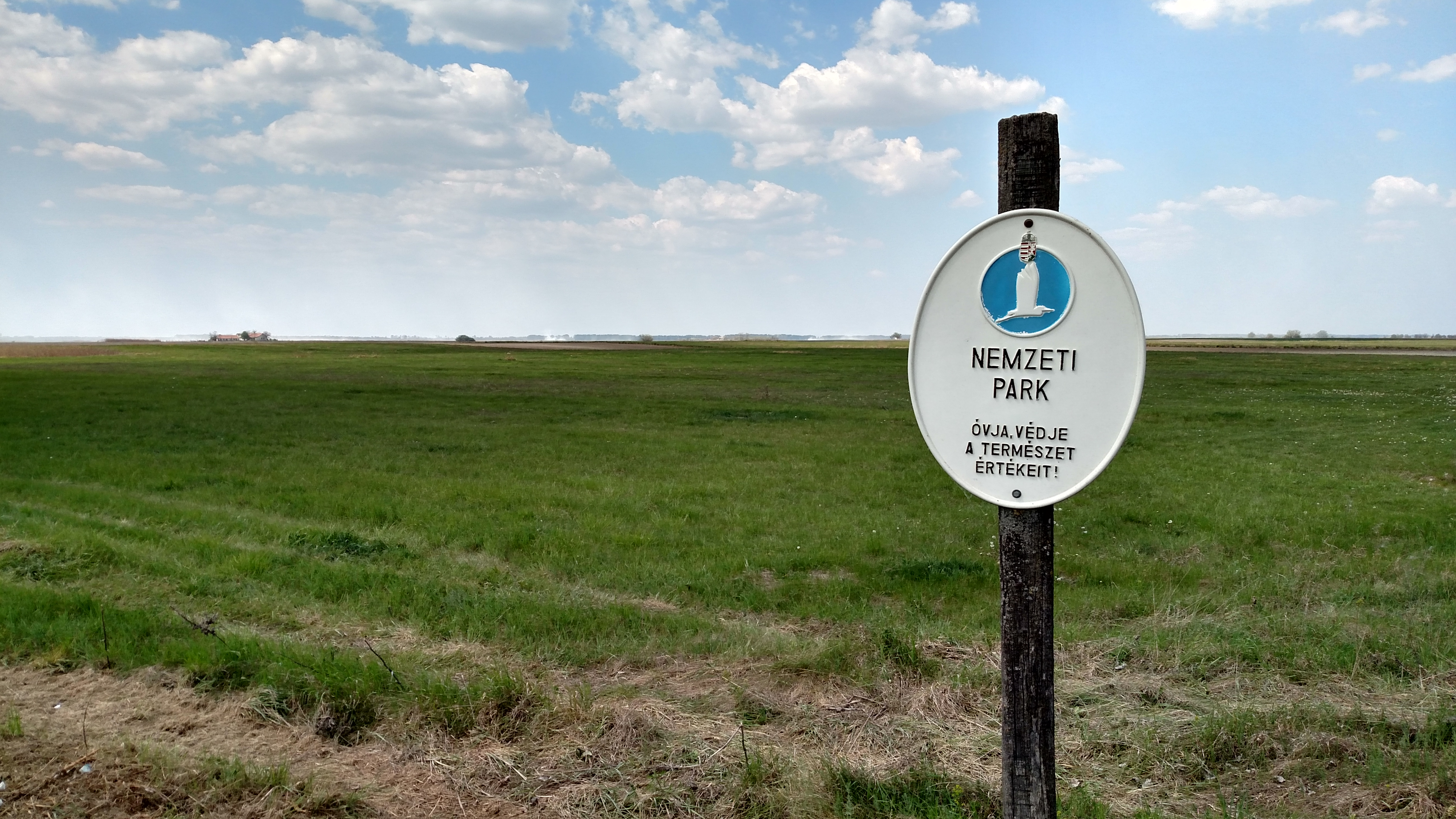
- Interactive map of Kiskunság National park
- Area: 530 km^{2} (200 sq mi)
- Established: 1 January 1975
- Website: knp.nemzetipark.gov.hu/

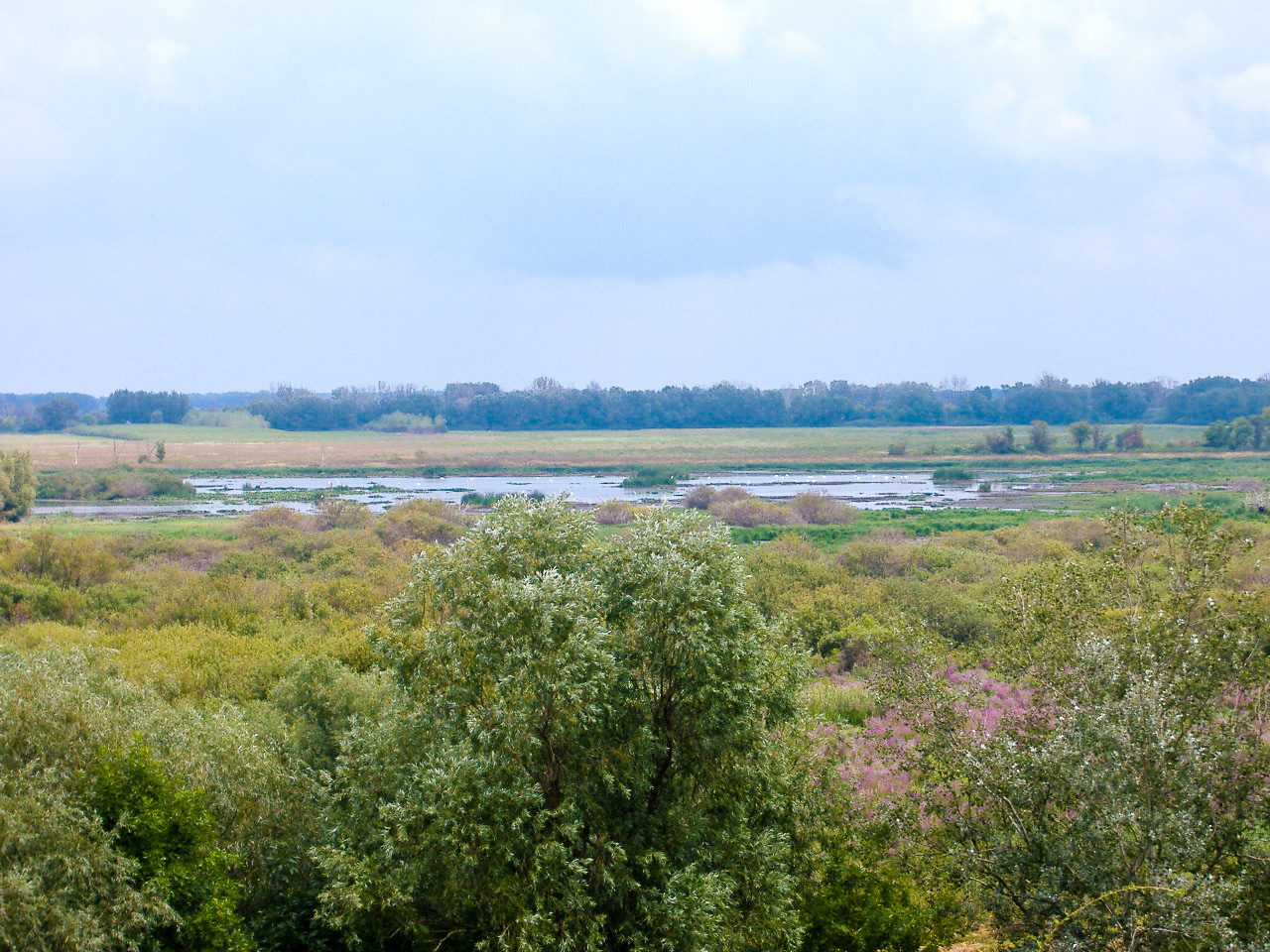
Meadow of Alpár in the national park

Kiskunság National Park (Hungarian: Kiskunsági Nemzeti Park) is a national park located in Danube–Tisza Interfluve mainly in Bács-Kiskun county, Hungary. It was created in 1975 and declared a biosphere reserve by the UNESCO. The park covers an area of 530 km^{2} and stretches across the Little Cumania (Kiskunság) region of the Great Hungarian Plain.

== Features ==
It is not a single territory, but comprises seven disjoint units, scattered throughout the area.

One of these is the Kiskunság's Puszta where annual events are held reviving the old pastoral life and cattle breeding customs.

Another is Lake Kolon near the town of Izsák. It is famous for its marsh tortoises, herons, expanses of untouched reeds and nine species of orchids which grow in the vicinity. An interesting natural phenomenon is the sand dunes in the vicinity of Fülöpháza. They are said to move under favourable wind conditions.

== Geography ==
The alkali lakes of the Little Cumania are found near Fülöpszállás and Szabadszállás. Their unique flora and fauna are of special value. Avocets, geese, and black-winged stilts nest in the area. The lakes provide a temporary home for tens of thousands of migratory birds. This ornithologist destination is also a UNESCO biosphere reserve. Lake Szelid near Kalocsa, Lake Vadkert by Soltvadkert, Lake fehér, and Lake Sós at Kiskunhalas are spots for bathing and camping. There are many tourist trails, study trails, and lookouts within the national park. The main visitor center of the Kiskunság National Park, called the 'House of Nature', is situated in Kecskemét.

== Gallery ==
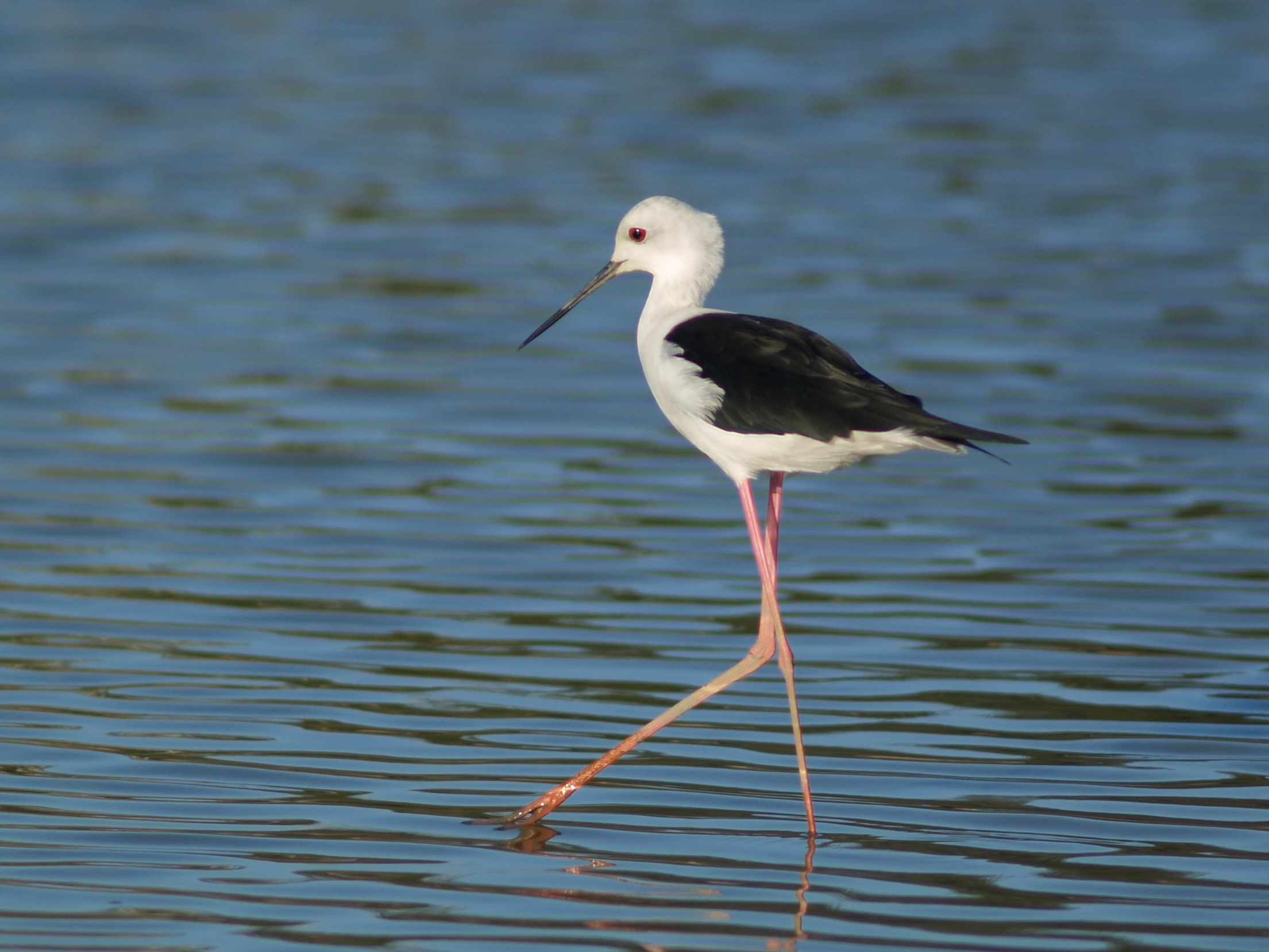
Black-winged stilt

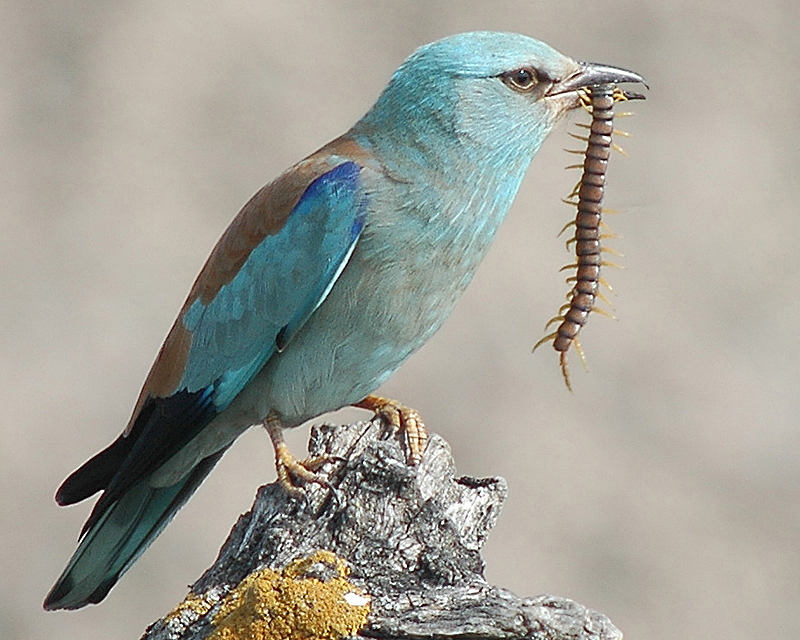
European roller

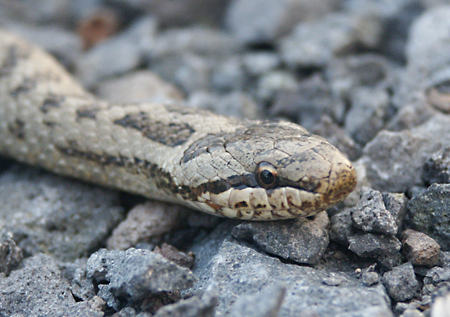
Coronella austriaca (smooth snake)

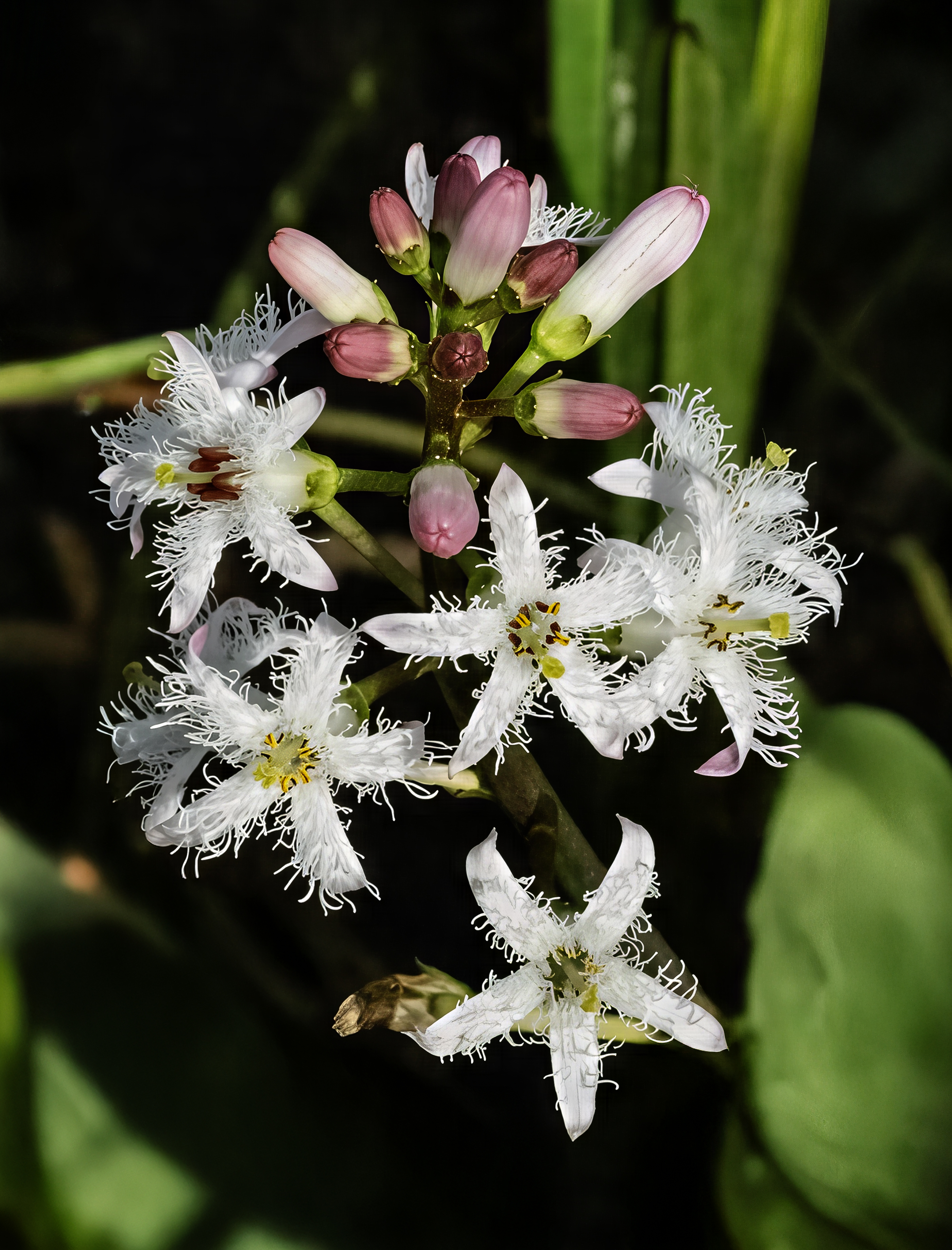
Menyanthes

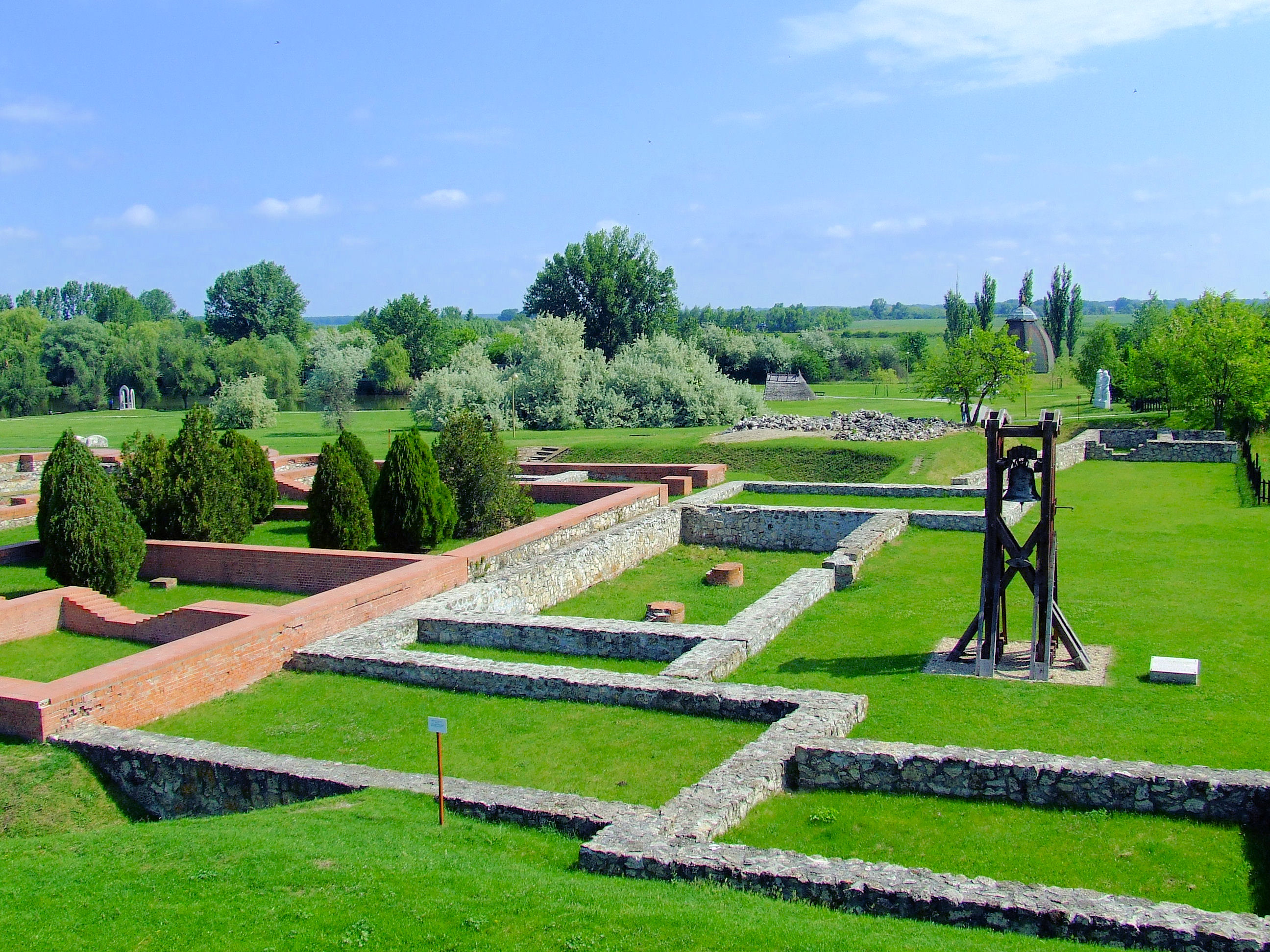
Open-air museum in Ópusztaszer

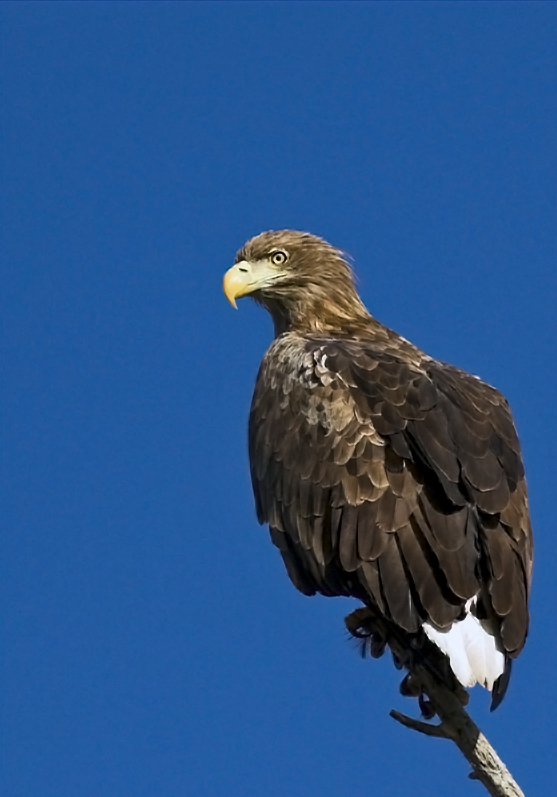
White-tailed eagle

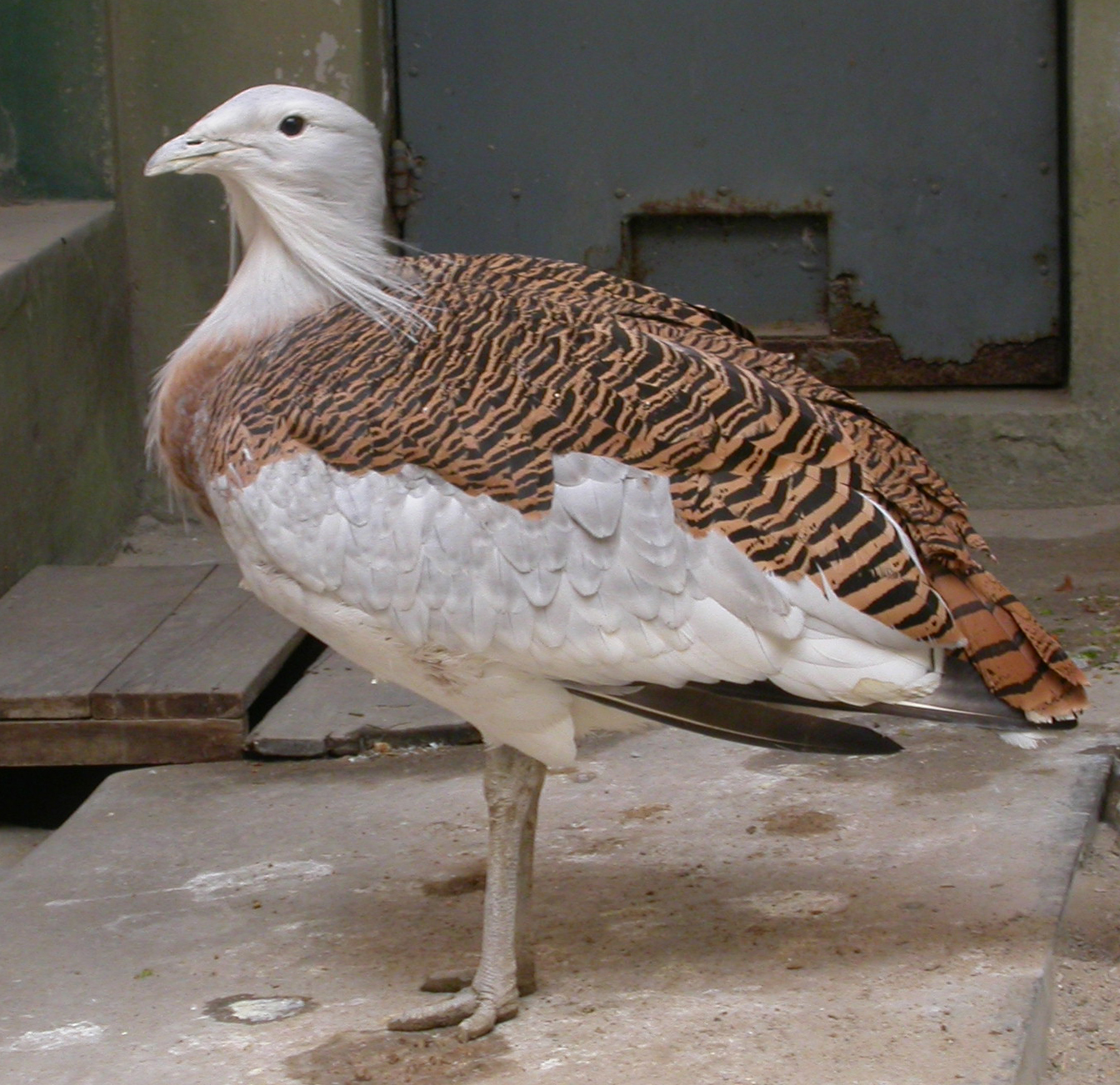
Great bustard

== See also ==
- List of national parks of Hungary
- Puszta
