= Kunszentmiklós District =

Coordinates: 47.02627209879484°N 19.124771576883848°E

Kunszentmiklós District Kunszentmiklósi járás
- Districts of Hungary
- Coat of arms

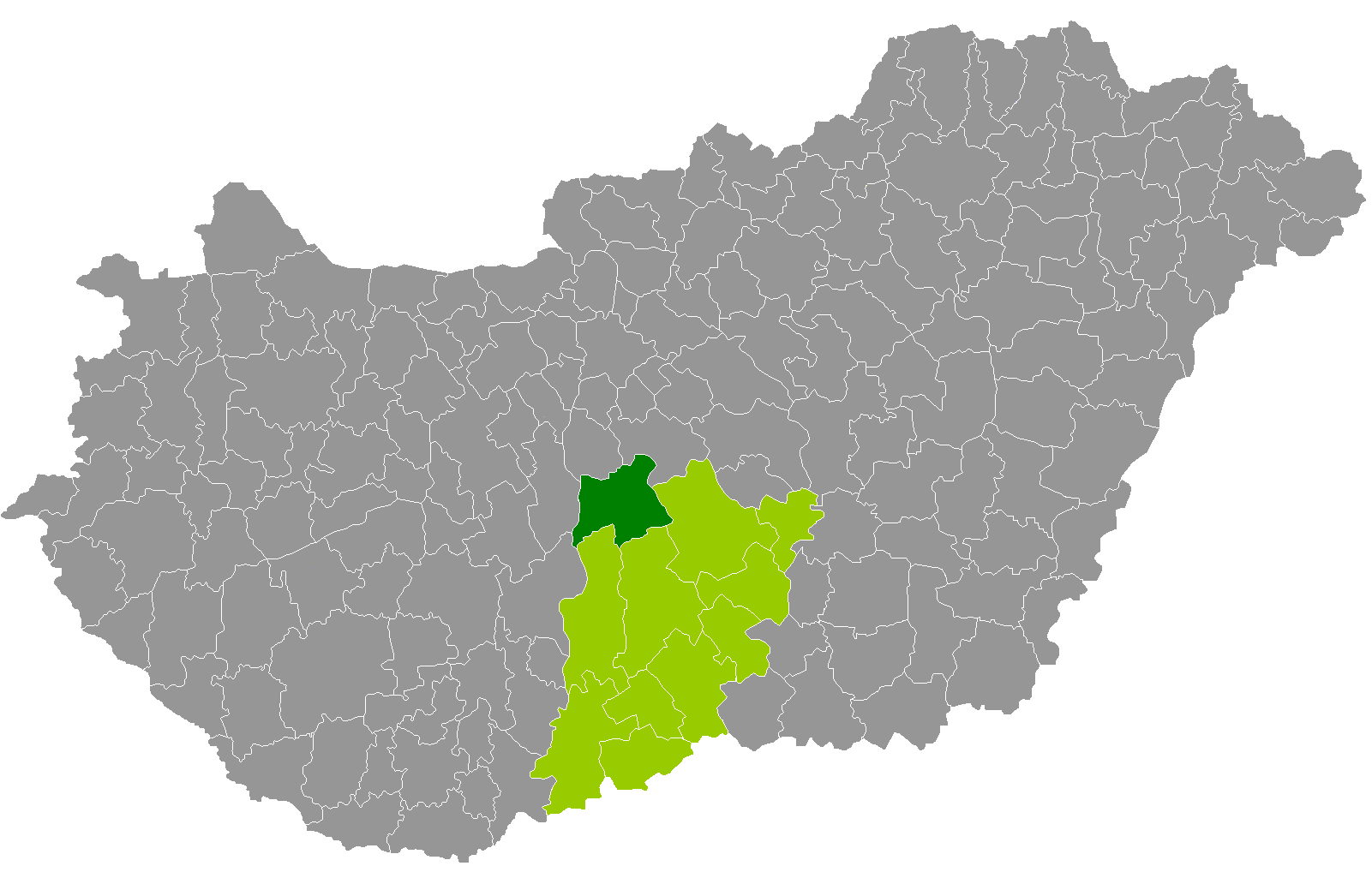
- Kunszentmiklós District within Hungary and Bács-Kiskun County.
- Country: Hungary
- County: Bács-Kiskun
- District seat: Kunszentmiklós

Area
  - Total: 769.81 km^{2} (297.23 sq mi)
  - Rank: 6th in Bács-Kiskun

Population (2011 census)
  - Total: 29,998
  - Rank: 7th in Bács-Kiskun
  - Density: 39/km^{2} (100/sq mi)

Kunszentmiklós (Hungarian: Kunszentmiklósi járás) is a district in north-western part of Bács-Kiskun County. Kunszentmiklós is also the name of the town where the district seat is found. The district is located in the Southern Great Plain Statistical Region.

== Geography ==
Kunszentmiklós District borders with Ráckeve District (Pest County) to the north, Dabas District (Pest County) to the northeast, Kecskemét District to the east, Kiskőrös District and Kalocsa District to the south, Paks District (Tolna County) and Dunaújváros District (Fejér County) to the west. The number of the inhabited places in Kunszentmiklós District is 9.

== Municipalities ==
The district has 3 towns and 6 villages. (ordered by population, as of 1 January 2012)

- Apostag (1,948)
- Dunaegyháza (1,504)
- **Dunavecse** (3,937)
- Kunadacs (1,566)
- Kunpeszér (649)
- **Kunszentmiklós** (8,515) – district seat
- **Szabadszállás** (5,896)
- Szalkszentmárton (2,827)
- Tass (2,906)

The bolded municipalities are cities.

== Demographics ==
Religion in Kunszentmiklós District (2011 census)
1. Catholic Church (31.2%)
2. Greek Catholicism (0.10%)
3. Calvinism (27.7%)
4. Lutheranism (2.20%)
5. Other religions (2.70%)
6. Non-religious (14.5%)
7. Atheists (0.60%)
8. Undeclared (21.0%)

In 2011, it had a population of 29,998 and the population density was 39/km^{2}.

Year	County population	Change
2011	29,998	n/a

=== Ethnicity ===
Besides the Hungarian majority, the main minorities are the Roma (approx. 900), Slovak (550) and German (150).

Total population (2011 census): 29,998
Ethnic groups (2011 census): Identified themselves: 28,732 persons:

- Hungarians: 26,822 (93.35%)
- Gypsies: 883 (3.07%)
- Slovaks: 555 (1.93%)
- Others and indefinable: 472 (1.64%)

Approx. 1,000 persons in Kunszentmiklós District did not declare their ethnic group at the 2011 census.

=== Religion ===
Religious adherence in the county according to 2011 census:

- Catholic – 9,401 (Roman Catholic – 9,357; Greek Catholic – 43);
- Reformed – 8,306;
- Evangelical – 656;
- other religions – 799;
- Non-religious – 4,363;
- Atheism – 186;
- Undeclared – 6,287.

== Gallery ==
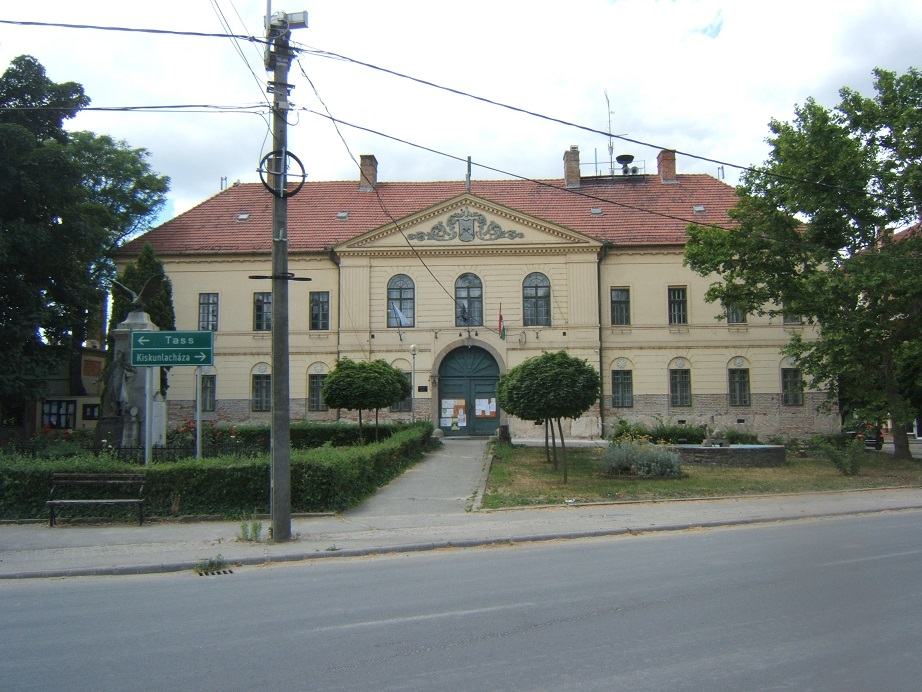
Kunszentmiklós, Town Hall

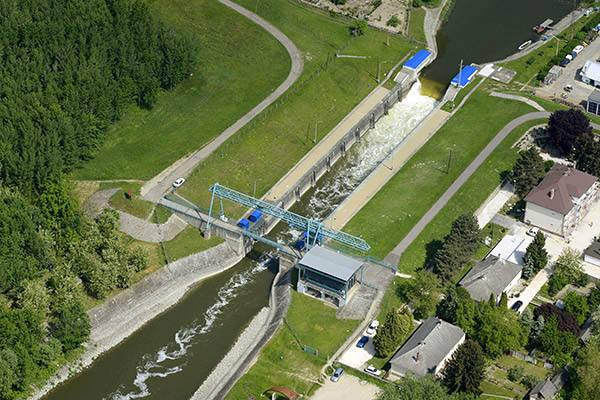
Sluice near Tass

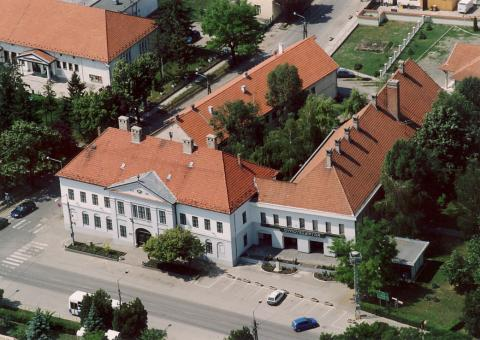
Aerial view of Szabadszállás

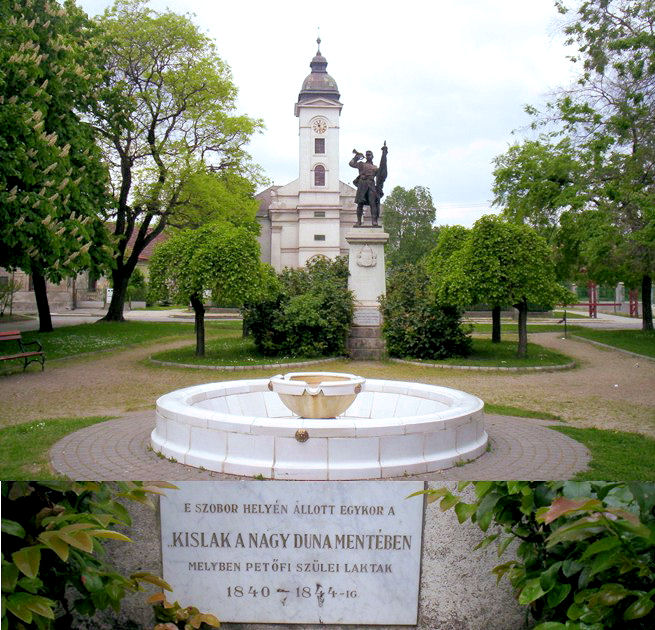
World War I Memorial and Reformed Church in Dunavecse

== See also ==
- List of cities and towns of Hungary
