= Apostag =

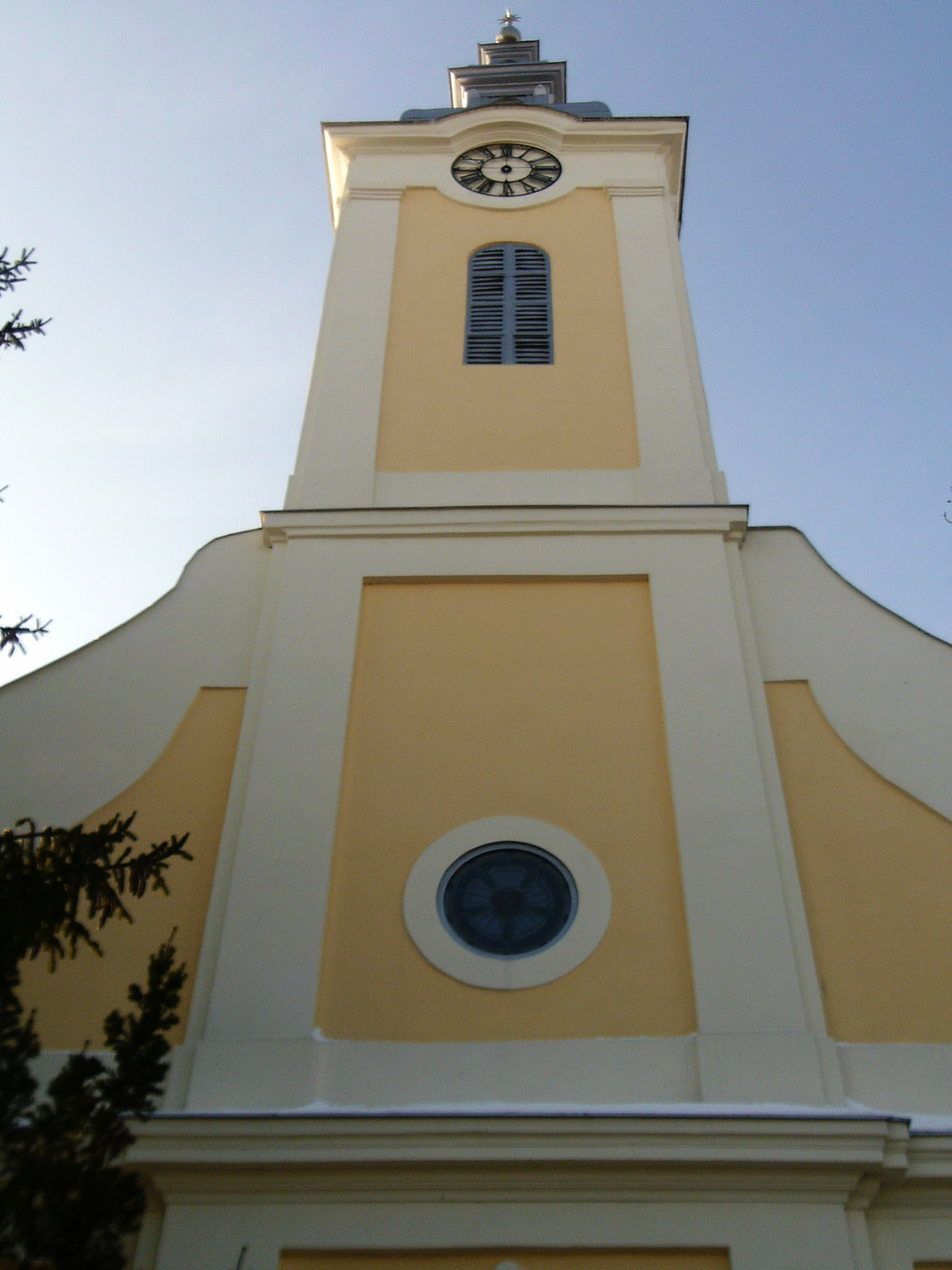

- Coat of arms

- Location of Apostag in Bács-Kiskun County Location of Apostag in Hungary
- Coordinates: 46°52′51″N 18°57′35″E
- Country: Hungary
- Region: Southern Great Plain
- County: Bács-Kiskun
- District: Kunszentmiklós

Area
  - Total: 31.94 km^{2} (12.33 sq mi)

Population (2015)
  - Total: 2,010
  - Density: 62.9/km^{2} (163/sq mi)
- Time zone: UTC+1 (CET)
  - Summer (DST): UTC+2 (CEST)
- Postal code: 6088
- Area code: 78

Apostag is a village and municipality in Bács-Kiskun county, in the Southern Great Plain region of southern Hungary.

Croats in Hungary call this village Štagara.

== Geography ==
It covers an area of 31.94 km^{2} (12 sq mi) and has a population of 2010 people (2015).

== History ==
In the medieval ages the village had a rotunda with 12 sided poligonal shape and its patrocinium was: The 12 Apostles. There was also similar patrocinium of Bény rotunda, recently in Bíňa, Slovakia.

== Gallery ==
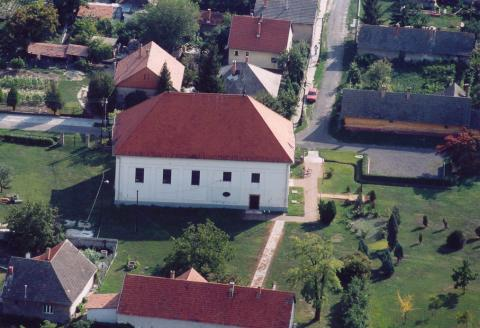

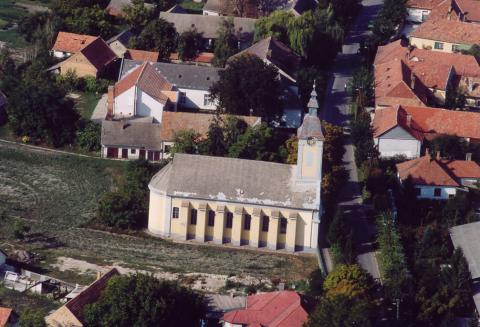

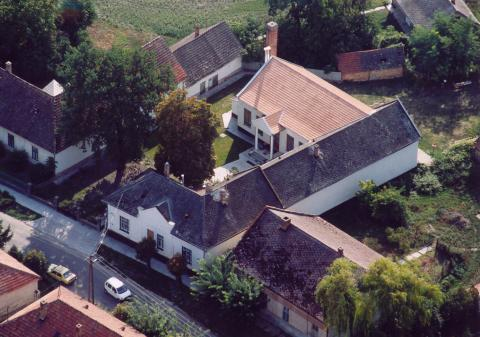
