= Dunapataj =

Village in Bács-Kiskun, Hungary

- Large village
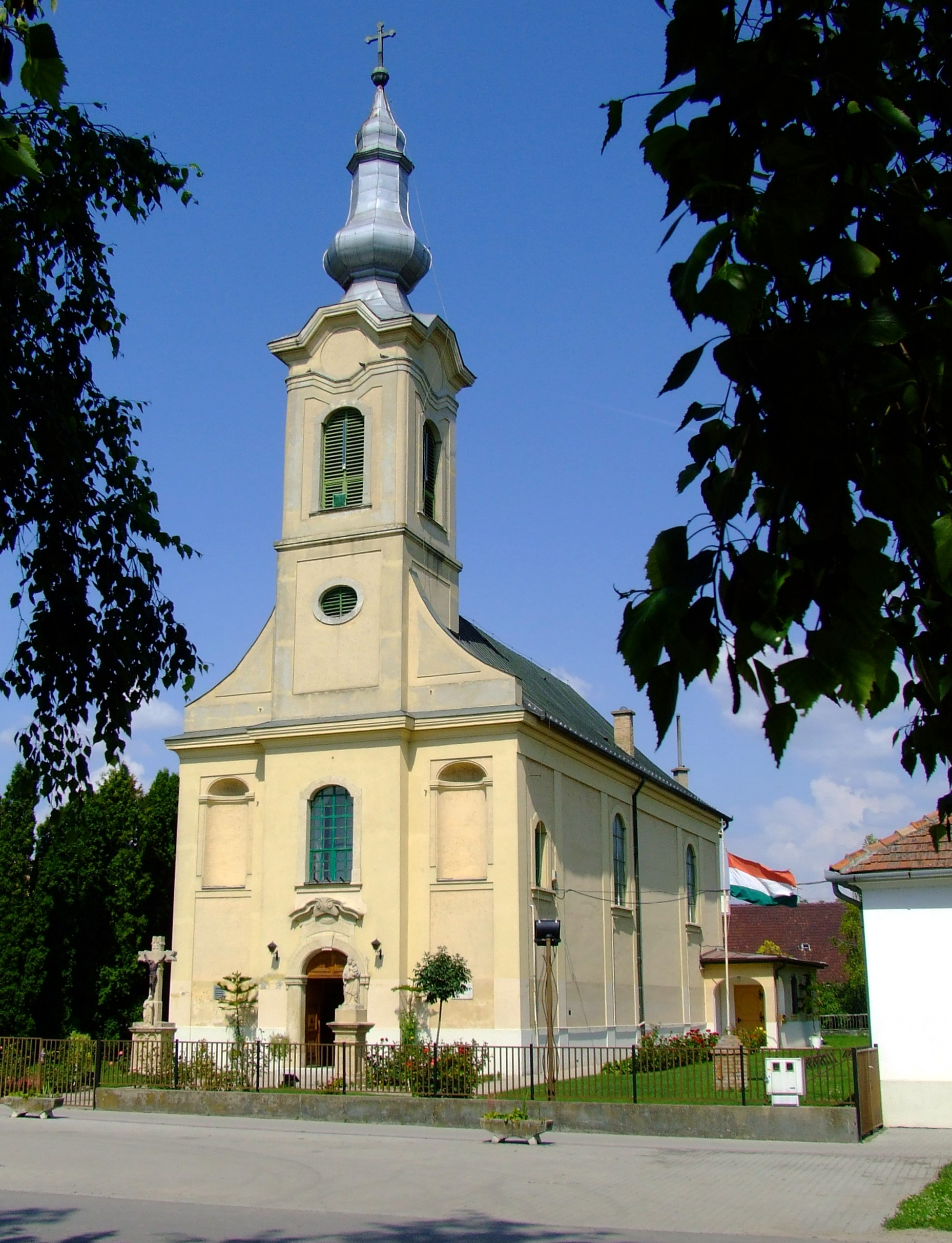
- Church of the Holy Mother of Hungary in Dunapataaj. Built in 1761 in the Copf style. The first building extension in Hungary was carried out on this church under the leadership of architect Károly Möller in 1934.

- Coat of arms

- Location of Dunapataj
- Coordinates: 46.643°N 18.996°E
- Country: Hungary
- County: Bács-Kiskun
- District: Kalocsa

Area
  - Total: 90.47 km^{2} (34.93 sq mi)

Population (2002)
  - Total: 3,735
  - Density: 41/km^{2} (110/sq mi)
- Time zone: UTC+1 (CET)
  - Summer (DST): UTC+2 (CEST)
- Postal code: 6328
- Area code: (+36) 78

Dunapataj is a large village in Bács-Kiskun county, Hungary.

It lies 10 km (6 mi) north from Kalocsa. It is the administrative headquarters of the local museum. Lake Szelidi, a holiday resort and nature reserve with unique wildlife is 4 km (2 mi) away. The Calvinist Church includes Gothic architecture remains from the 15th century and the Baroque-style Church of Saint John of Nepomuk dates from 1761. A former Transylvanian style Unitarian church, built in 1937, is located in the middle of town and houses the local history documents of the Museum of Pataj.

Festivals are held in July and August - the Szelidi Summer - and September - the Pataji Autumn.

== Politics ==
=== Partnerships ===
- Since 2004 it there a partnership with the municipality Oyten in Germany
