= Sándor Font =

Hungarian politician (born 1960)

Member of the National Assembly
- In office 18 June 1998 – 8 May 2026

Personal details
- Born: 23 November 1960 (age 65) Soltvadkert, Hungary
- Party: Fidesz (since 2005)
- Other political affiliations: MDF (1989–2004)
- Spouse: Ildikó Fontné Fehér
- Children: Sára; Orsolya; Márk
- Profession: engineer, politician

Sándor Font (born 23 November 1960 in Soltvadkert, Hungary) is a Hungarian politician, who was a member of the National Assembly of Hungary (Országgyűlés) for Kiskőrös from 1998 to 2014 and for Kalocsa from 2014 to 2026. He was elected to his first term in 1998. He is a Fidesz party member. He is married and has two daughters, Sára and Orsolya, and a son, Márk. He attends the Lutheran church in Soltvadkert.

He graduated from Budapest University of Technology and Economics in 1990, where he majored in engineering.

Font later attended Corvinus University of Budapest with a focus on economics.

Since 1989 he was a member of Hungarian Democratic Forum, than became a member of the city council in Soltvadkert. In 1994 he was running for a seat in the National Assembly of Hungary, but lost. He was elected in 1998 and became a member of the Agricultural, Budget, and Finance committees. He served as chairman of the Committee on Agriculture from 2010 to 2026 (with a brief interruption in May 2014).

He is now a member of the Fidesz party.

Font was defeated by Tisza candidate Gyula Kovács in the 2026 Hungarian parliamentary election, thus he did not secure a mandate after 28 years.

== Personal life ==
He is married. His wife is Ildikó Fontné Fehér. They have two daughters, Sára and Orsolya and a son, Márk.
