= Tass, Hungary =

Village and municipality in Hungary

Tass
- Flag Coat of arms

- Location of Tass Tass (Hungary) Tass (Europe)
- Coordinates: 47.019°N 19.029°E
- Country: Hungary
- County: Bács-Kiskun
- District: Kunszentmiklós

Area
  - Total: 74.72 km^{2} (28.85 sq mi)

Population (2025)
  - Total: 2,836
  - Density: 40/km^{2} (100/sq mi)
- Time zone: UTC+1 (CET)
  - Summer (DST): UTC+2 (CEST)
- Postal code: 6098
- Area code: 76

Tass is a village and municipality in Bács-Kiskun County, in the Southern Great Plain region of southern Hungary.

== Geography ==
It covers an area of 74.02 km^{2} (29 sq mi) and had a population of 2,836 people as of 2025.

== Population ==
Population trends between 2013 and 2025:

Number of inhabitants:	2833	2773	2704	2800	2861	2848	2834	2836
	2013	2014	2018	2021	2022	2023	2024	2025

In the 2022 census, 91.0% of the population identified themselves as Hungarian, 2.7% as Romani, 0.4% as German, and 0.1% each as Bulgarian, Ruthenian, Ukrainian, Slovak, or Romanian. Additionally, 0.9% answered "other, non-domestic nationality", and 8.9% did not wish to answer.

The religious distribution was as follows: 24.4% as Reformed Christian, 18.8% as Roman Catholic, 2.8% as other Catholic, non-denominational as 14.9% and 37.1% did not wish to answer.

== Mayors ==
=== Mayors ===
- 1990–1994: Győző Horváth
- 1994–1998: Győző Horváth
- 1998–2002: Győző Horváth
- 2002–2006: József Pálné Csík
- 2006–2010: József Csík
- 2010–2014: Gábor Németh
- 2014–2019: Gábor Németh
- 2019–2024: Gábor Németh
- 2024– : Gábor Németh

== Gallery ==
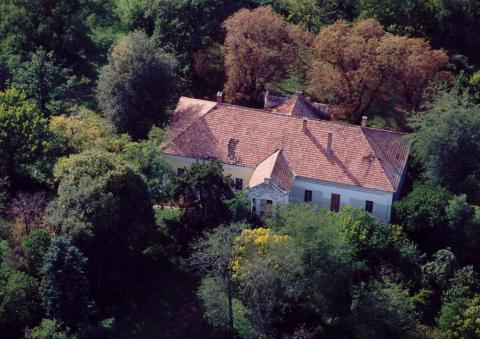
Darányi Mansion

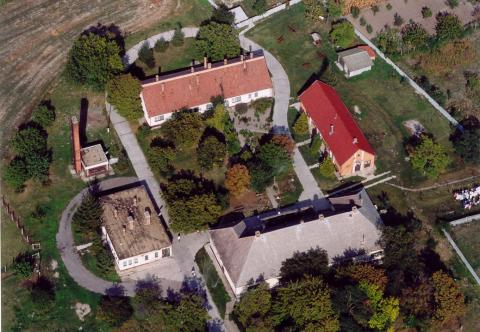
Home for Disabled People Tass

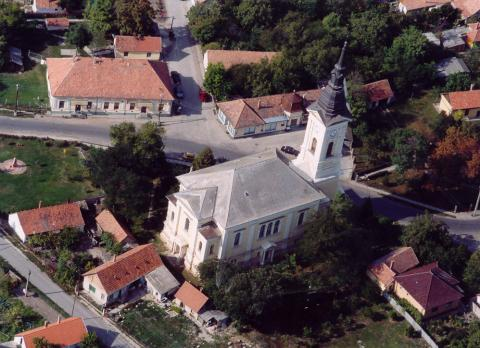
Reformed Church
