= List of mayors of Soltvadkert =

This is a list of mayors that served the city of Soltvadkert, Hungary.

- ??–?? – Gyula Havasi
- ??–1990 – Károly Nagy
- 1990–2006 – László Berkecz
- 2006–2019 – Ferencz Lehoczki
- 2019-present – Temerini Ferenc

== See also ==
- List of Hungarians#History and politics
- List of people from Bács-Kiskun
- Lists of mayors by country
