= List of people from Bács-Kiskun =

People from county of Hungary

The following are people who were either born/raised or have lived for a significant period of time in Bács-Kiskun.

== The arts ==
=== Art ===
- Ede Telcs – sculptor

=== Film ===
- Kálmán Latabár – actor, comedian

=== Literature ===
- József Katona – author
- Ferenc Móra – novelist
- Sándor Petőfi – Hungarian national poet
- Kálmán Tóth – poet

=== Music ===
- Zoltán Kodály – composer, ethnomusicologist, educator, linguist and philosopher
- Emma Sándor – composer, wife of Zoltán Kodály

== Aviation and space exploration ==
- Béla Magyari – cosmonaut

== Military ==
- András Gáspár – Hungarian general
- Lázár Mészáros – Hungary's first Minister of War
- István Türr – Giuseppe Garibaldi's general

== Public office ==
- László Berkecz – mayor of Soltvadkert
- Sándor Font – member of the National Assembly

== Science and medicine ==
- József Bayer – member of Hungarian Academy of Sciences
- Jenő Ernst – doctor, biologist, member of Hungarian Academy of Sciences
- Dénes Jánossy – mailing member of Hungarian Academy of Sciences
- Dezső Miskolczy – explorer of the mental disease, member of Hungarian Academy of Sciences

== See also ==
- List of Hungarians
