= Kunszentmiklós =

- Town
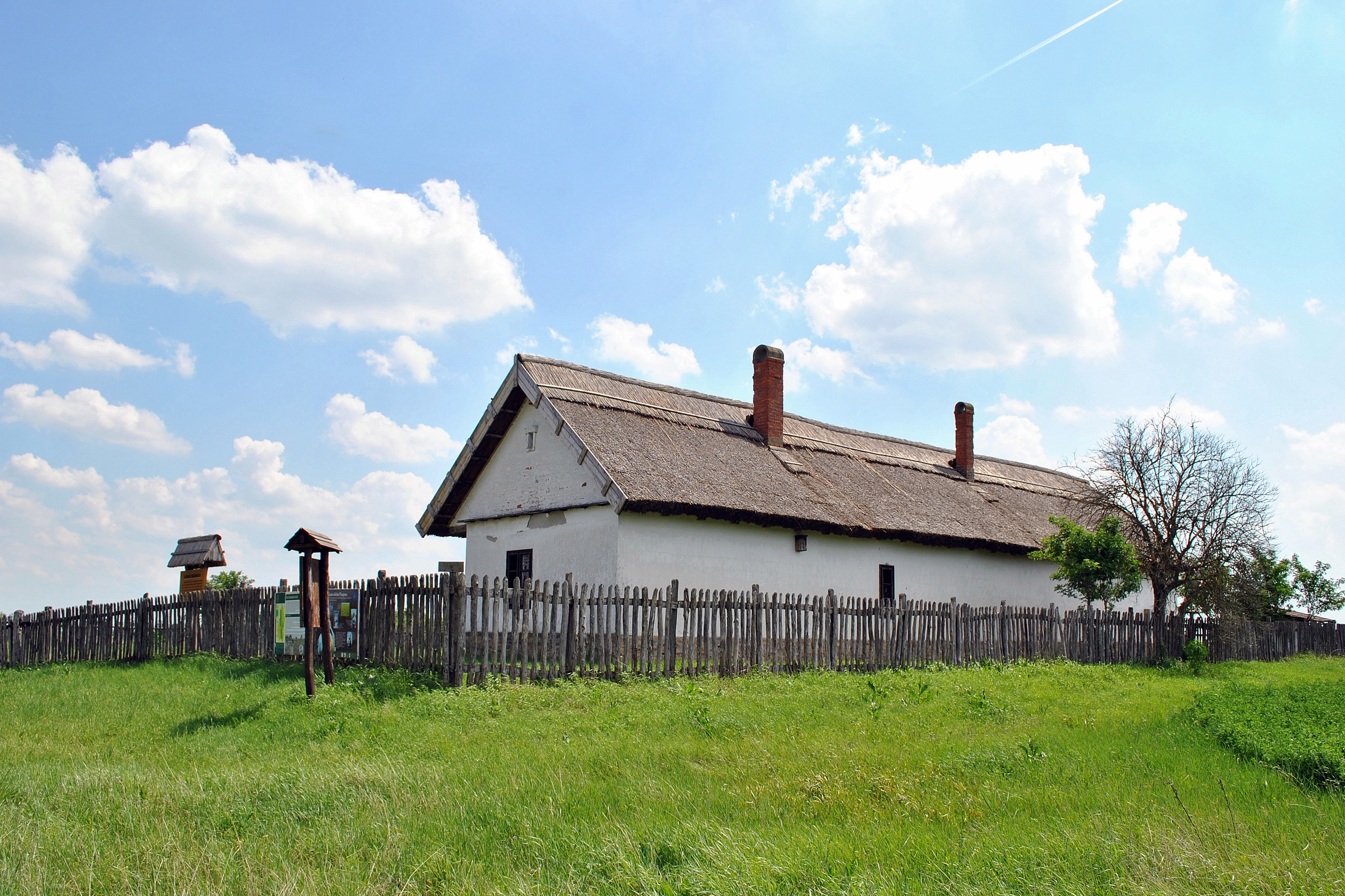

- Flag Coat of arms

- Location of Kunszentmiklós in Bács-Kiskun County Location of Kunszentmiklós in Hungary
- Coordinates: 47.02641°N 19.12278°E
- Country: Hungary
- Region: Southern Great Plain
- County: Bács-Kiskun
- District: Kunszentmiklós

Area
  - Total: 172.11 km^{2} (66.45 sq mi)

Population (2008)
  - Total: 8,793
  - Density: 52.45/km^{2} (135.8/sq mi)
- Time zone: UTC+1 (CET)
  - Summer (DST): UTC+2 (CEST)
- Postal code: 6090
- Area code: (+36) 76
- Website: www.kunszentmiklos.hu

Kunszentmiklós (German: Sankt Niklas) is a town in Bács-Kiskun county, Hungary. The name is derived from the Cumans (Kun in Hungarian).

== Twin towns – sister cities ==
Kunszentmiklós is twinned with:

- Băicoi, Romania
- Blumberg, Germany
- Chepa, Ukraine
- Cristuru Secuiesc, Romania
- Karcag, Hungary
- Miggiano, Italy
- Skorenovac (Kovin), Serbia
- Suhindol, Bulgaria
- Trzemeszno, Poland
- Xagħra, Malta
- Zadvarje, Croatia

== See also ==
Cuman people
