= Szabadszállás =

- Town
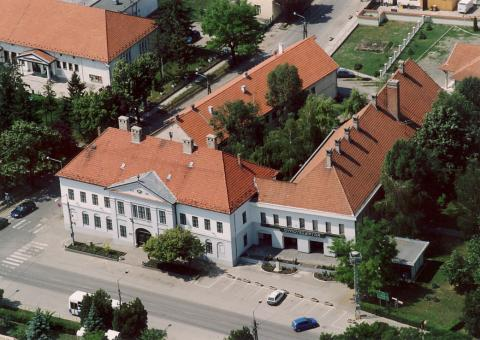
- Aerial view

- Flag Coat of arms

- Location within Hungary
- Coordinates: 46°52′N 19°13′E
- Country: Hungary
- County: Bács-Kiskun
- District: Kunszentmiklós

Area
  - Total: 164.62 km^{2} (63.56 sq mi)

Population (2015)
  - Total: 6,148
  - Density: 37.35/km^{2} (96.73/sq mi)
- Time zone: UTC+1 (CET)
  - Summer (DST): UTC+2 (CEST)
- Postal code: 6080
- Area code: (+36) 76
- Website: www.szabadszallas.hu

Szabadszállás is a town in Bács-Kiskun county, Hungary, 80 kilometres south of Budapest by rail. The town is surrounded by several areas of the Kiskunság National Park.

== Twin cities ==
- Schönenberg-Kübelberg Germany

== Gallery ==
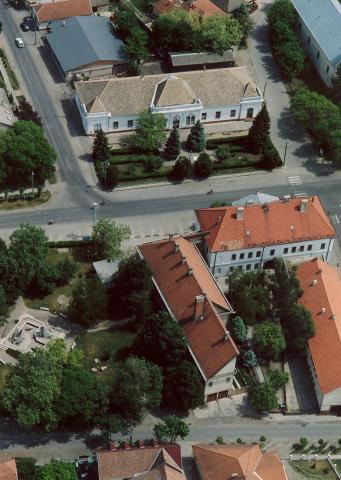

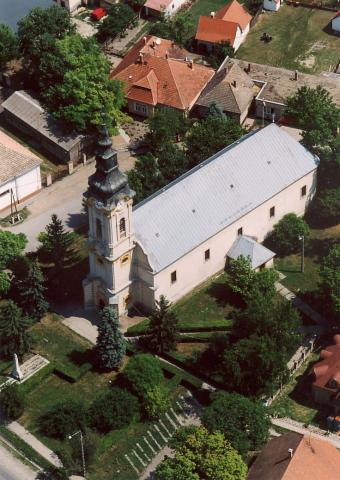

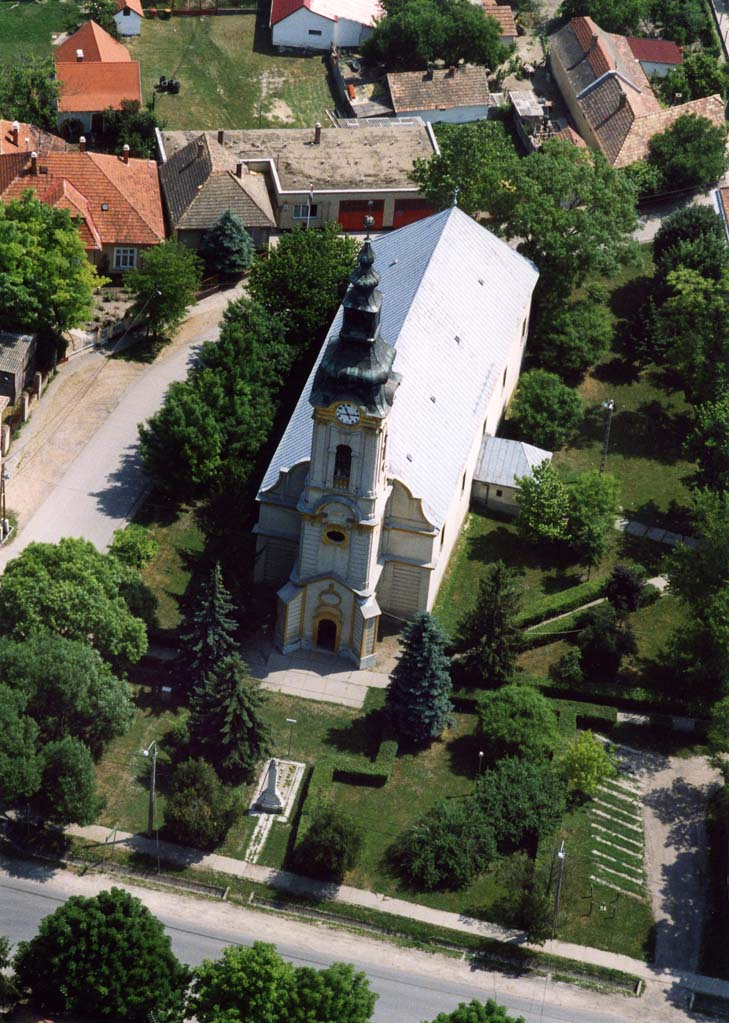
