= Dunavecse =

- Town
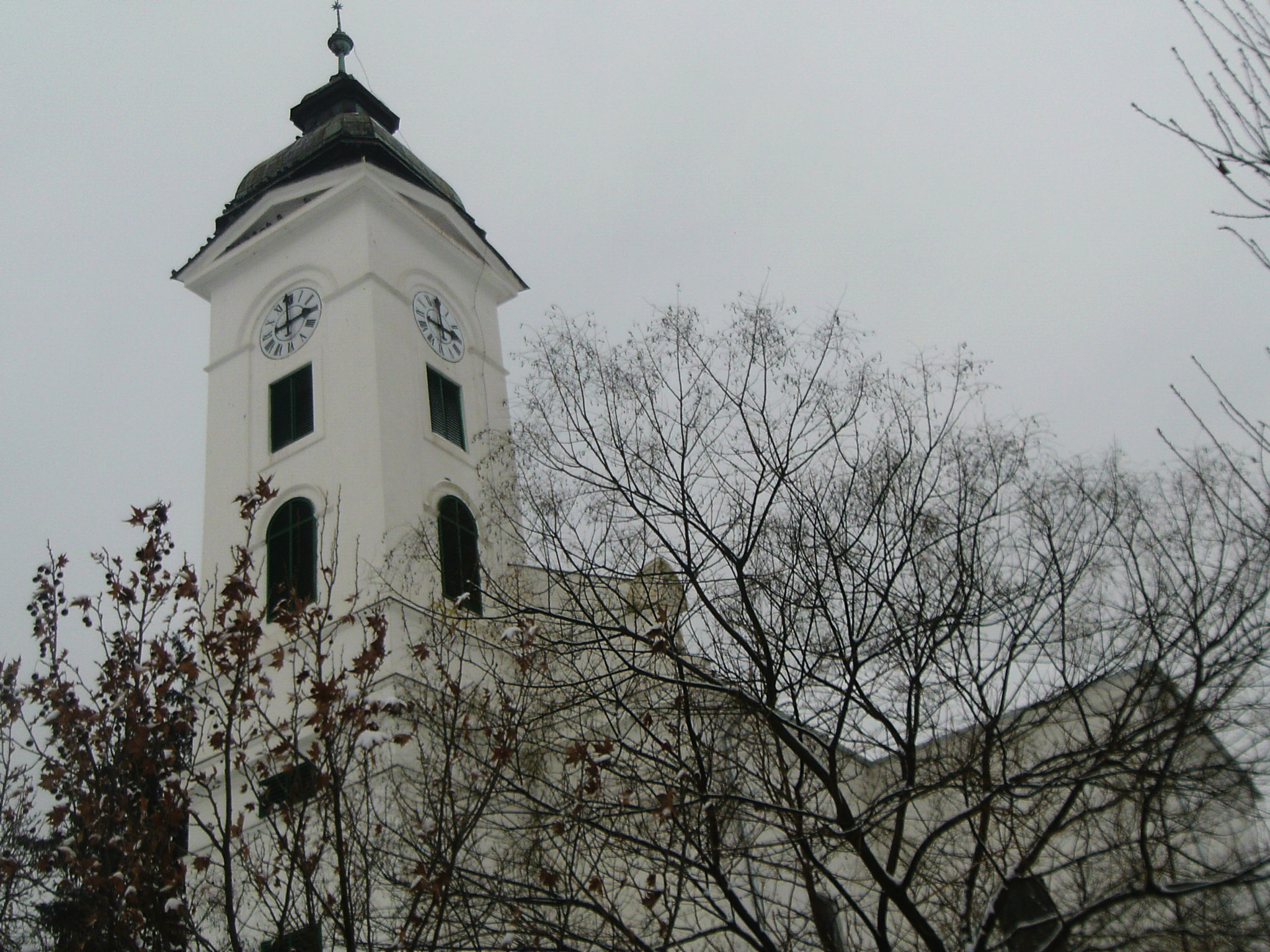

- Flag Coat of arms

- Location within Hungary
- Coordinates: 46.91375°N 18.97236°E
- Country: Hungary
- County: Bács-Kiskun
- District: Kunszentmiklós

Area
  - Total: 66.77 km^{2} (25.78 sq mi)

Population (2008)
  - Total: 4,079
  - Density: 62.1/km^{2} (161/sq mi)
- Time zone: UTC+1 (CET)
  - Summer (DST): UTC+2 (CEST)
- Postal code: 6087
- Area code: (+36) 78
- Website: www.dunavecse.hu

Dunavecse is a town and municipality in Bács-Kiskun County in southern Hungary.

Croats in Hungary call this town Večica.
