= Lake Vadkert =

Lake in Hungary

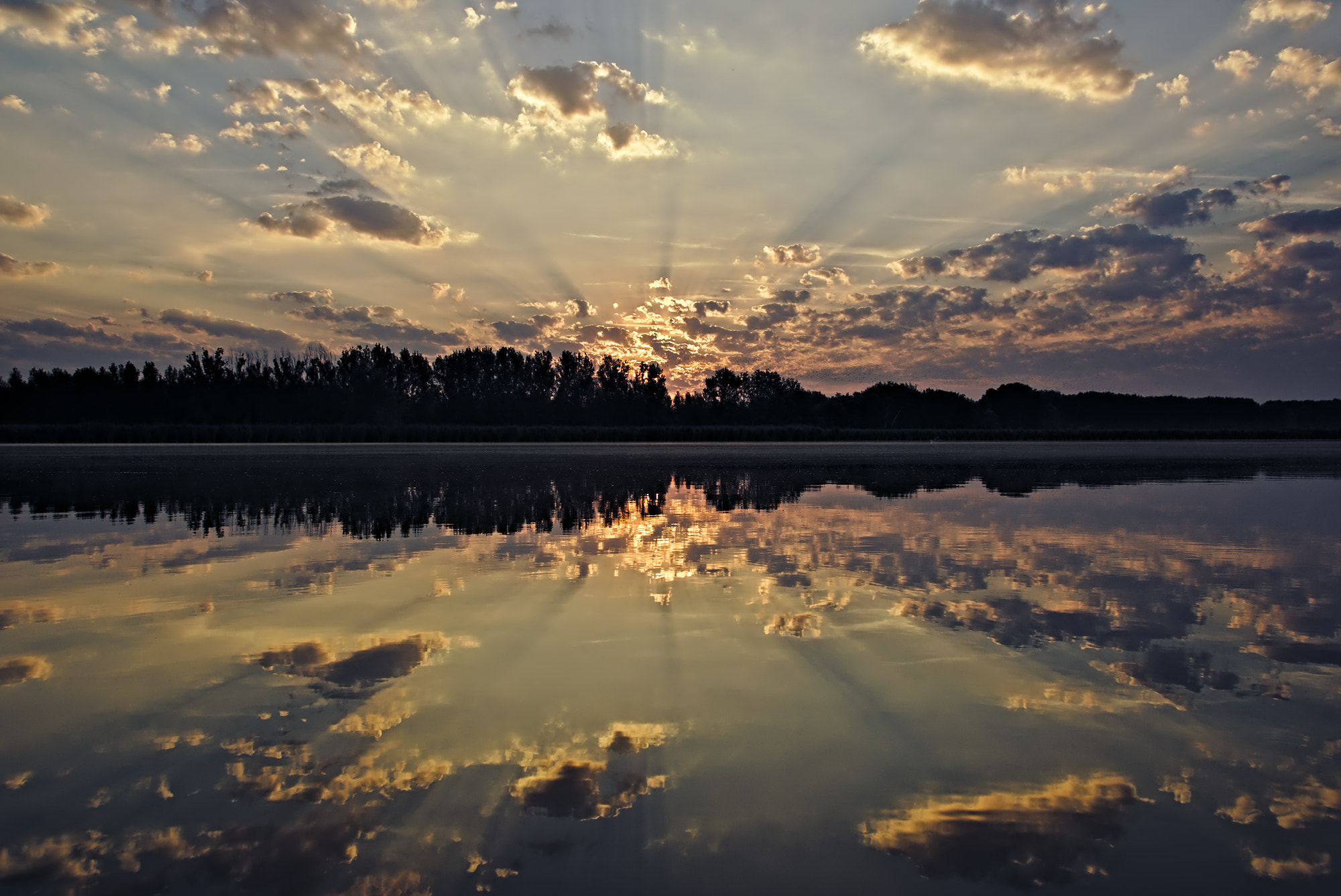

- Location within Hungary
- Location: Soltvadkert
- Coordinates: 46°36′55″N 19°23′35″E
- Basin countries: Hungary
- Surface area: 63.7 hectares (157 acres)
- Average depth: 1–2 metres (3 ft 3 in – 6 ft 7 in)
- Max. depth: 2 metres (6 ft 7 in)
- Surface elevation: 108.5 metres (356 ft)

Lake Vadkert is a saline lake located on the sand ridge of Kiskunság in Danube–Tisza Interfluve, 3 kilometres (1.9 mi) northwest of Soltvadkert.
