= Lake Szelid =

Lake in Dunapataj, Bács-Kiskun County, Hungary

- Szelidi-tó (Hungarian)
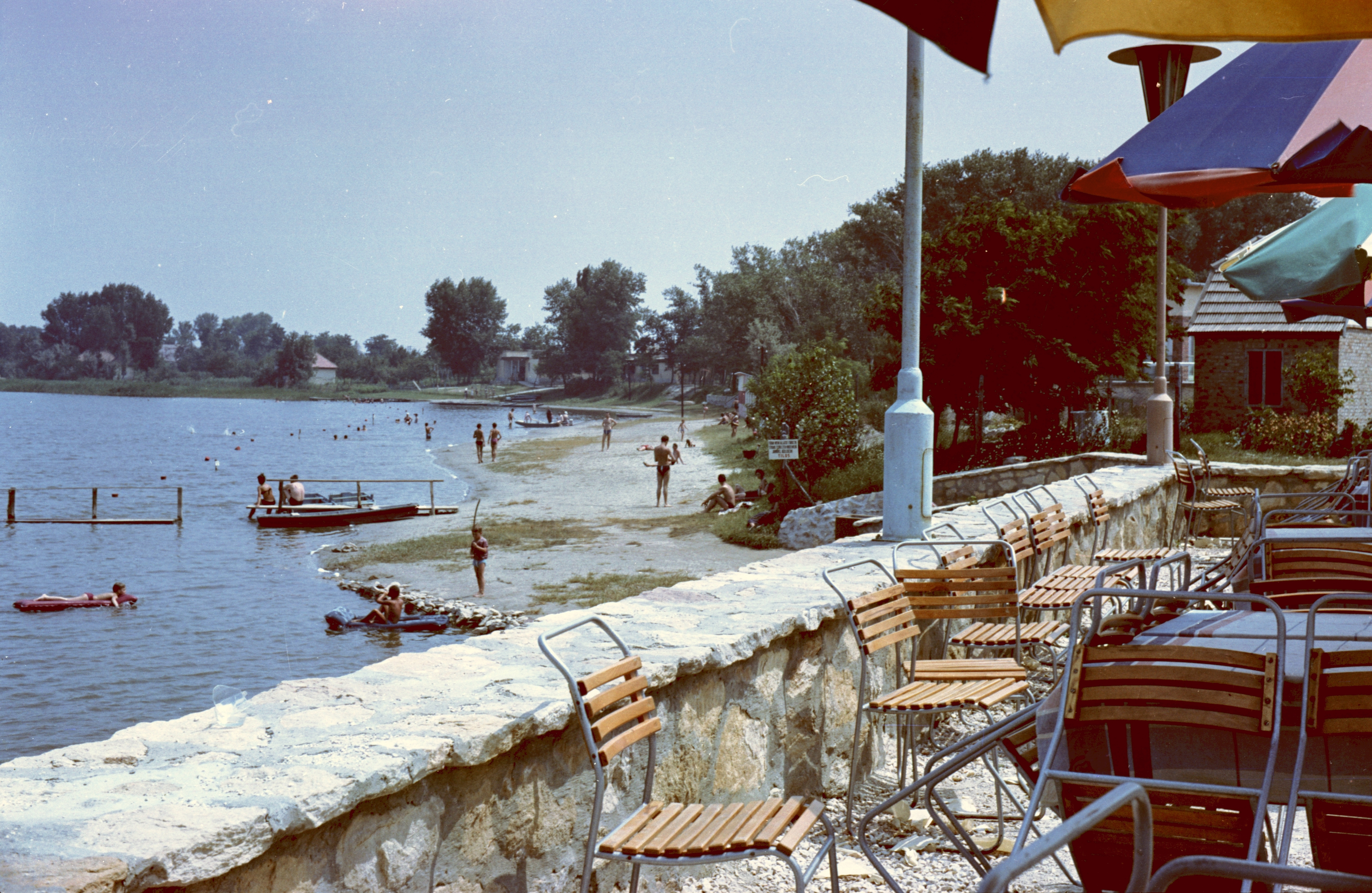
- Lake Szelid, View from the Terrace of the Lake's Restaurant

- Location within Hungary
- Location: Bács-Kiskun
- Coordinates: 46°38′48″N 19°5′36″E
- Type: salt lake
- Basin countries: Hungary
- Max. length: 4 km (2.5 mi)
- Max. width: 200 m (660 ft)
- Surface area: 0.8 km^{2} (0.31 sq mi)
- Average depth: 3 m (9.8 ft)

Lake Szelid (Hungarian: Szelidi-tó) is a lake in Bács-Kiskun county, Hungary. It contains 0.8 km^{2} (0.31 sq mi) of water.

== Geography ==
An unusual salt lake formed from an old branch of the Danube, Lake Szelid can be found 4 km southeast from Dunapataj. The lake, with a maximum width of 200 m and length of 4 km is only three meters deep on average. Thus warms quickly in the summer, sometimes reaching 28 degrees Celsius. Apart from the therapeutic effects of the medicinal salts, the lake is also used for relaxation and fishing. There is a campsite nearby and a sandy beach on the southern side.
