= Soltvadkert =

- Town
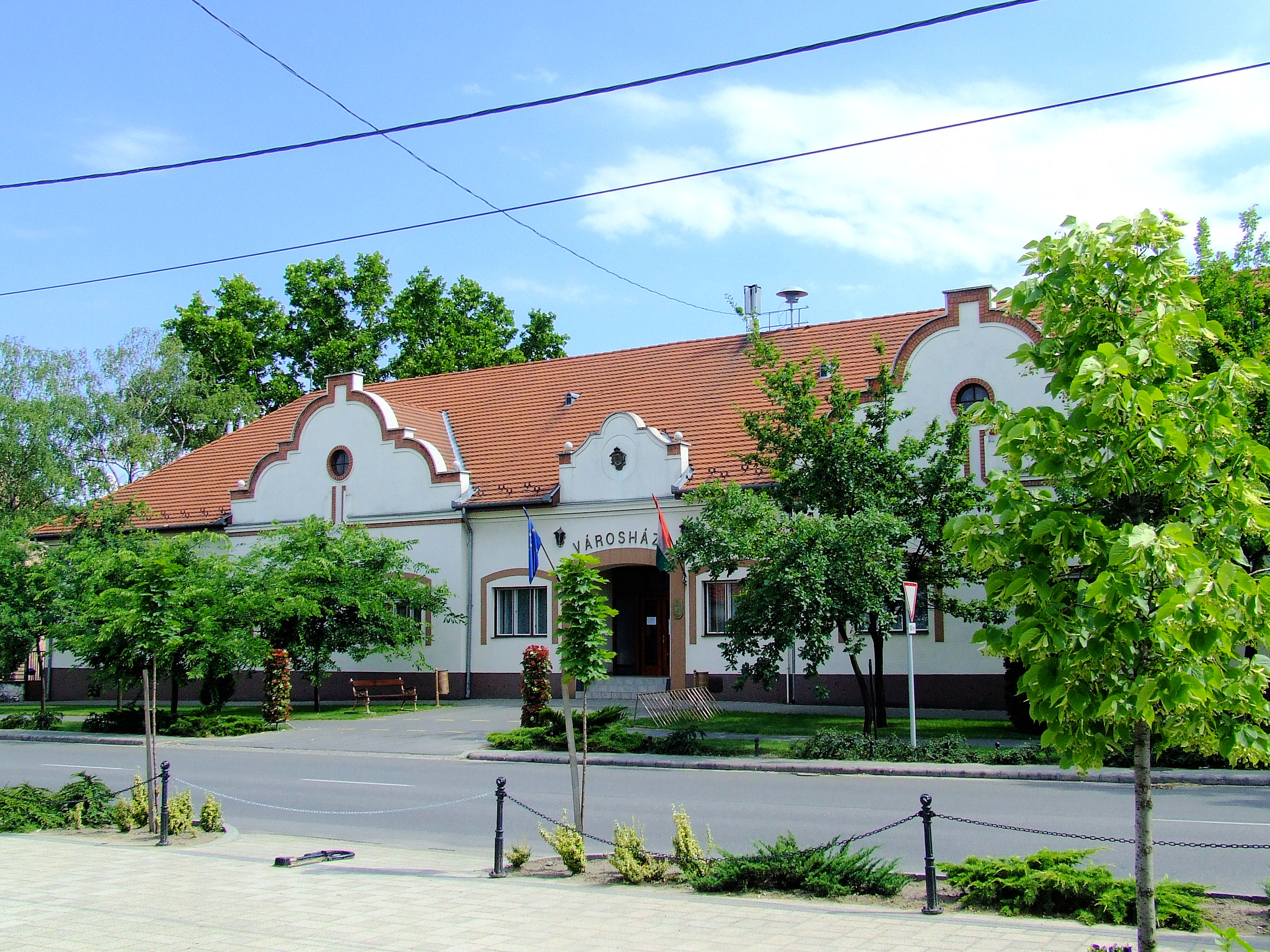
- Town Hall

- Flag Coat of arms

- Location of Soltvadkert in Hungary
- Coordinates: 46.58087°N 19.39370°E
- Country: Hungary
- County: Bács-Kiskun
- District: Kiskőrös

Government
  - Mayor: Temerini Ferenc

Area
  - Total: 108.86 km^{2} (42.03 sq mi)

Population (2008)
  - Total: 7,597
  - Density: 69.79/km^{2} (180.7/sq mi)
- Time zone: UTC+1 (CET)
  - Summer (DST): UTC+2 (CEST)
- Postal code: 6230
- Area code: +36 78
- Website: https://soltvadkert.hu/

Soltvadkert (German: Wadkert; Croatian: Vakier; Yiddish: וואדקערט), formerly known as Vadkert, is a town in Bács-Kiskun County in Hungary with approximately 8,000 inhabitants. It is surrounded by several areas of Kiskunság National Park and Lake Vadkert.

== History ==
The name Vadkert was a reference to the region's active wildlife in Hungary. Founded in 1376, the town was renamed to Soltvadkert in 1900. While Hungary was occupied by the Turkish army, Soltvadkert lost much of its population. In the beginning of the 1740s, Baron Orczy moved German settlers to Soltvadkert.

The town has quickly developed its main center of tourism in the county. Lake Vadkert (also called Büdös-tó), is nearby Soltvadkert. It attracts many tourists every year from all over Europe.

Soltvadkert is well known throughout Europe for its wine production which goes back centuries in history. Its multicultural past, present, and future mainly depends on the grape and wine industry.

According to the 1910 census, Soltvadkert had 7,836 residents. The religious make-up of the town was as follows:

- Roman Catholic: 3,176 people (41%)
- Lutheran: 2,983 people (38%)
- Calvinist: 1,220 people (16%)
- Jewish: 312 people (4%)
- Other denomination: 145 people (2%)

=== Jewish history ===
Soltvadkert was home to a thriving Orthodox Jewish community, numbering approximately 400 people before World War II. The community had a synagogue located on the main street, a cheder with one melamed and about 60 students, and a yeshiva with 20-25 students, which was bigger than the Kiskőrös yeshiva. From 1905, the Vodkerter Rav (town rabbi) was Rabbi Yeshaya Pollak (1871-1941), who was the son of Rabbi Baruch Pollak and Perl Rivka Pollak (née Grünfeld).

Rabbi Yeshaya Pollak was born in Senta and studied Torah from Rabbi Yeshaya Zilberstein (died 1930), the Chief Rabbi and rosh yeshiva of Vietzen and the Shevet Sofer. He was also the son-in-law of Rabbi Yehuda Grünfeld, the rabbi of Bűdszentmihály. He wrote and published many books by leading Torah scholars of many eras with his comments. After his death, his son, Rabbi Moshe Mordechai Pollak (1900-1949) became the town rabbi. Rabbi Moshe Mordechai Pollak's son-in-law, Rabbi Asher Anshel Katz, is the rabbi and rosh yeshiva of the Vien community in Brooklyn.

Rav Yehuda ("Reb Yiddel") Weber (1920–2006) was born in Soltvadkert to Rav Yisoscher (Berman) Weber, a descendant of the Bach, and Rebbetzin Chana, a niece of the Arugas HaBosem. After his Bar Mitzvah, Yehuda was sent to learn in Pupa under Rav Yaakov Yechezkiye Grünwald (the Vayaged Yaakov and Pupa Rebbe), who was his rebbi muvhak for 7 years. When he died at the age of 58, he was succeeded by his son, Rav Yosef Grünwald, the Vayechi Yosef. Rav Yehuda then served as mashgiach of Pupa. When the yeshiva was closed in 1944, Rav Yehuda spent 6 months in the local work camps before being deported to Bergen-Belsen. In 1946, his sister introduced him to his Rebbetzin, Batsheva. A year later, his sister, Miriam (1918-2019), who was also born in Soltvadkert, married the Rebbe, Rav Yosef Grünwald. Both families settled in Antwerp, then moved to Williamsburg, New York, in 1950. In 1952, Rav Yehuda was appointed as a Maggid Shiur in the newly established Pupa Yeshiva, first located in Queens, then in Ossining, Westchester County. Although his family stayed in Williamsburg, Reb Yiddel made the 40-mile drive for sixteen years.

By 1935, antisemitism was present in Soltvadkert. According to Jozsef Faludi, a student at the Soltvadkert yeshiva, there were often fights. The Christian children waited for Jewish students after lessons and threw rocks at them. At the end of May 1944, the Soltvadkert Jews were concentrated in the ghetto located by the market square, with 308 Soltvadkert Jews according to the Kiskőrös District chief judge's 23 May 1944 proclamation. The chief judge ordered the Jewish community to form a Judenrat consisting of three individuals and permitted leaving the ghetto for only two people and only for 2 hours each day to purchase food for the ghetto residents. In June 1944, the ghetto was liquidated, and Jews were forced to march 26 kilometers to a copper sulfide factory near Kecskemét, from where they were deported to Auschwitz. Upon arrival, one Soltvadkert resident, Isabella Bernath, was separated from her mother and sister by the infamous Josef Mengele.

After the war, Soltvadkert became home to the last active yeshiva in Hungary under Rabbi Simon Yechezkel Jakobovics's (1902–1983) leadership with about 50 students. Among the students was Rav Yitzchak Schlesinger (died 2001), who became an advocate for the preservation of Jewish cemeteries in Hungary with a blessing from the Berach Moshe, the Satmarer Rebbe. The yeshiva eventually closed in 1956 when the students and rabbis emigrated abroad. Today, the Jewish cemetery remains the only sign that Jews ever lived in Soltvadkert, which is also the resting place of rabbis Yeshaya and Moshe Mordechai Pollak.

== Geography and environment ==
Soltvadkert is located at 46°34'41" North, 19°23'45" East. The village of Selymes located south of the town towards Kiskunhalas is administratively part of Soltvadkert.

== Demographics ==
As of 2022, the town was 91% Hungarian, 1.6% German, 1.7% Romani, and 2.1% of non-European origin. The population was 29.5% Roman Catholic, 20.3% Lutheran, and 9.5% Reformed.

== Economy ==
Soltvadkert is the center of one of the biggest wine regions in Hungary. There are grapes on over 8,000 ha in the area. Soltvadkert is home to a variety of grapes. The town annually produces about 250-300 thousand hl of wine .

== Education ==
Soltvadkert is home to the Lajos Kossuth Elementary and Middle School (in Hungarian: Kossuth Lajos Általános és Művészeti Alapiskola), but does not have any high schools.

== Religion ==
Soltvadkert is among the rare Hungarian towns that have a Lutheran church in the center. This is due to the high number of German immigrants in the 18th century who built the church. Freedom of religion was, however, forbidden, and the Roman Catholic archbishop and his servants of Kalocsa have many times destroyed the church. A new Lutheran church was built in 1837, which is still in a very good shape. During the centuries, schools and other church-oriented buildings were constructed around it. The church currently has three bells in use. Inside the church there is a historical Rieger organ, which was installed in 1908. On the side of the church wall is a German sign which states: "Dies ist der Denckstein der evangelica Kirche in Vadkert" (This is the cornerstone of the Lutheran church of Vadkert). Even after 40 years of persecution, the Lutheran community is still active in Soltvadkert.

The Roman Catholic Church has been represented in Soltvadkert since 1737. It is currently the biggest Christian denomination in town by population. The first church was built in the 18th century for Baron Lőrinc Orczy. Since 1908, a larger church has also been in use.

In 1722, seven Calvinist families moved to Vadkert from Germany. Others followed them in the 1740s. After years of religious persecution, they were finally allowed to build a church, which was finished at noon on September 26, 1794.

The Baptist mission started in 1891 in Soltvadkert. As of 2000, there are over 200 followers of the church.

The history of the Pentecostal church in Soltvadkert goes back to 1935. The Pentecostal movement, which started in 1900 in the United States, reached Soltvadkert after World War I.

== Government ==
The city of Soltvadkert is managed by the city council. After the 2019 election, its members include:

- Temerini Ferencz, Mayor of Soltvadkert, FIDESZ 2,063 votes (67.84%)
- Galántai Norbert, FIDESZ,
- Kárász András, FIDESZ,
- Lantosné Dr. Mayer Zsuzsanna, FIDESZ,
- Medgyes Attila Jenő, independent representative
- Dr. Pozsgai Boglárka, FIDESZ
- Weppert Sándor, independent representative
- Zsikla Győző, independent representative
- Zsikla Tamás, FIDESZ

== Tourism ==
Soltvadkert is one of Hungary's most visited towns. The city center has numerous specialty shops and restaurants that offer fine food. The town center is home to a nationally renowned confectionery and coffee shop, famous for housing the "National Cake of the Year" competition every year, held on August 20, Hungary's King Day. Soltvadkert also offers a variety of community programs every month and hosts a number of concerts and festivals in the summer.

The nearby Lake Vadkert is visited by many people all year long.

== Sports ==
Vadkert FC is a professional football team from Soltvadkert. They are widely known in the region and their games attract many fans. Soltvadkert is the hometown of retired tennis player Ágnes Szávay.

== Twin towns ==
- Bodelshausen, Germany
- Sărmășag, Romania

== See also ==
- List of mayors of Soltvadkert
