= List of palaces and mansions in Hungary =

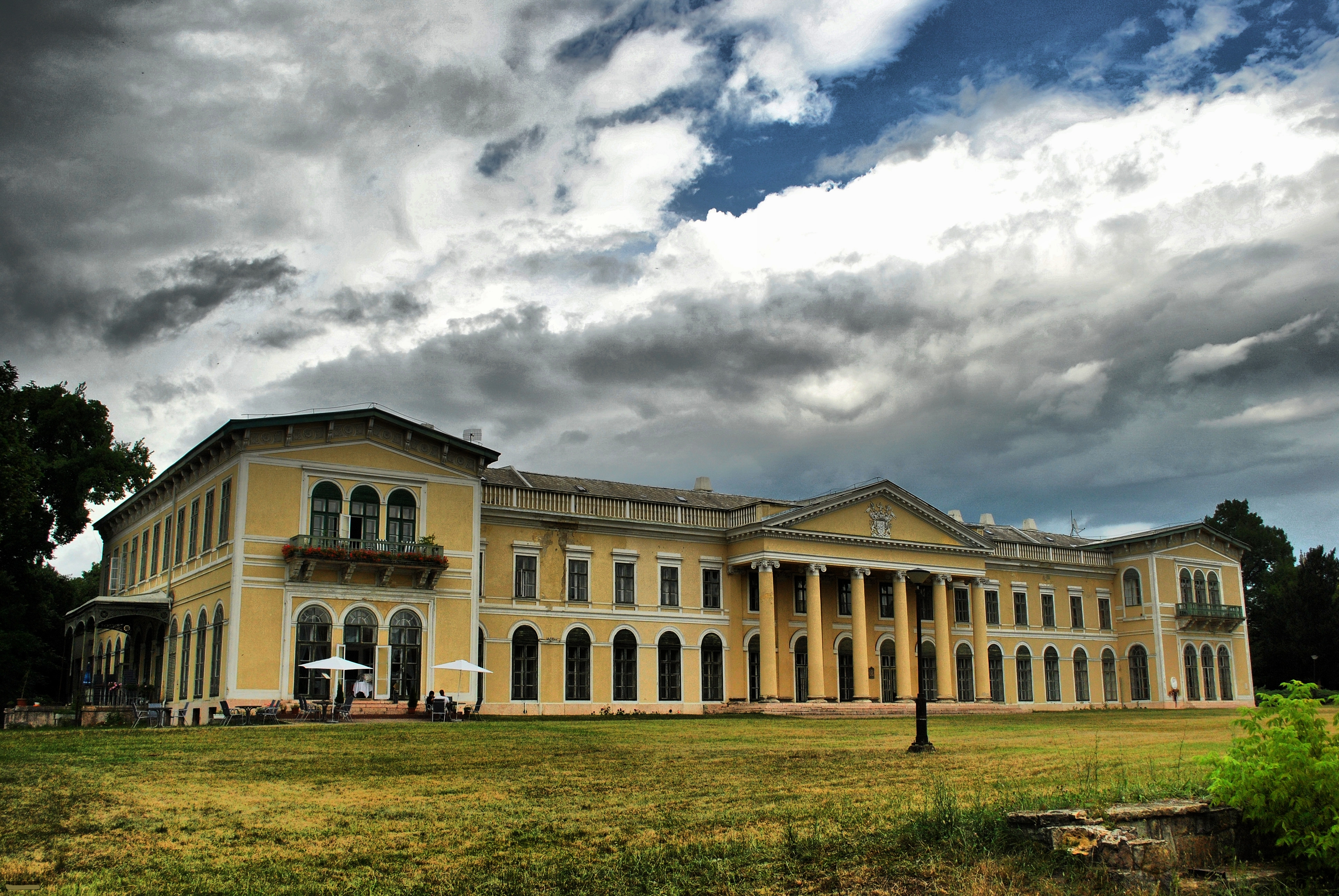
Károlyi Palace in Fót, Pest County

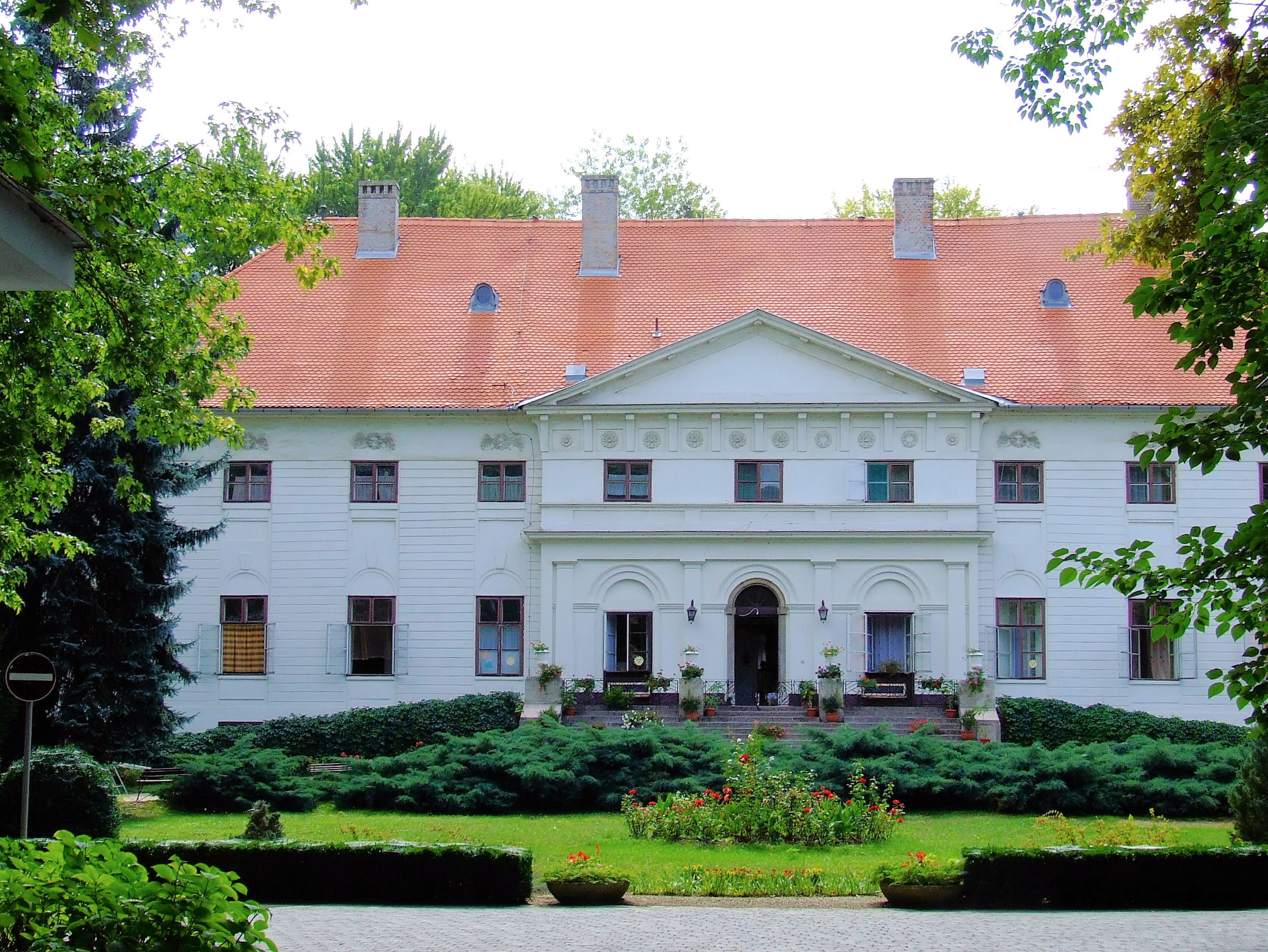
Batthyány Palace in Bóly

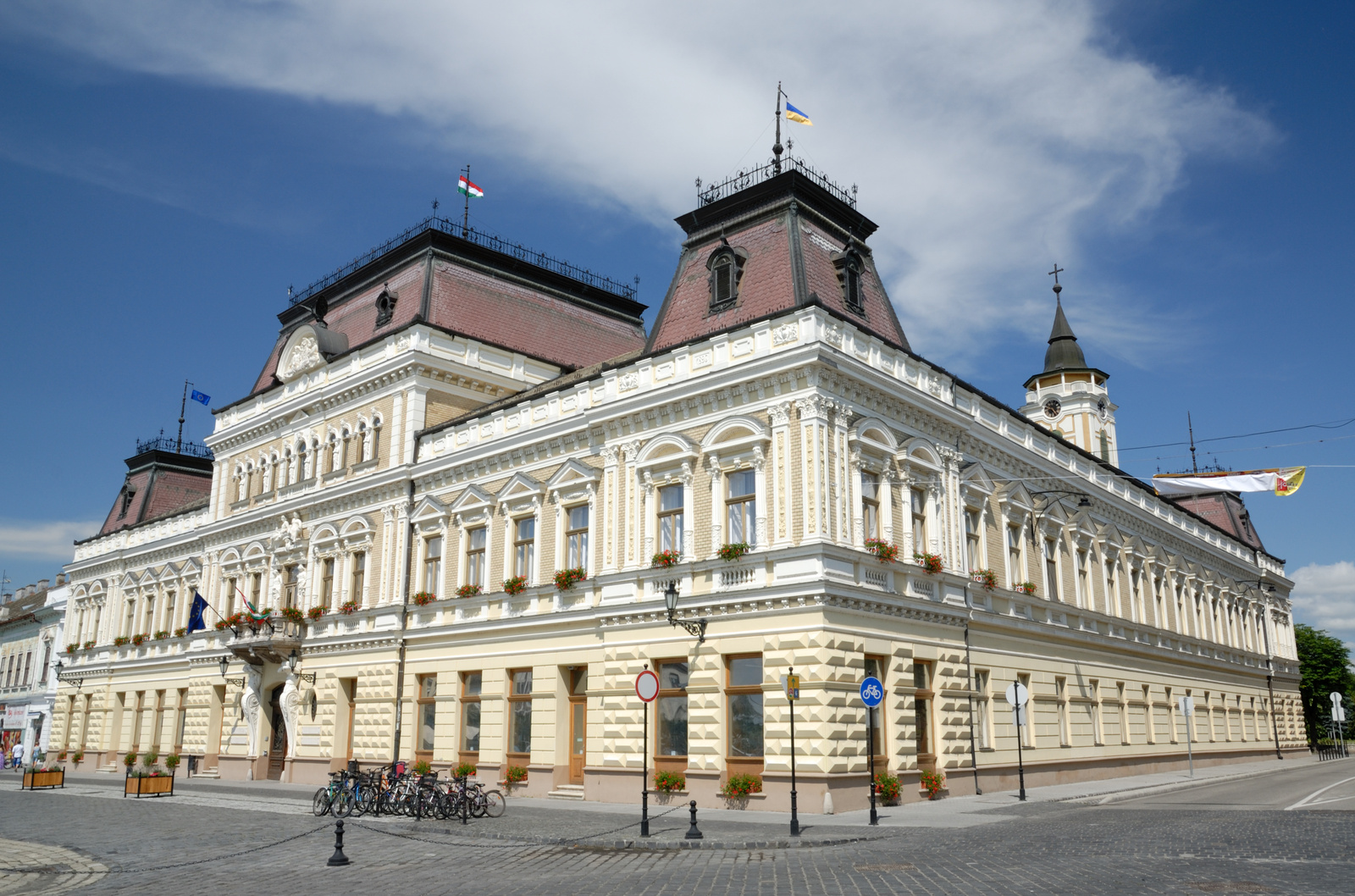
Patasich–Grassalkovich–Viczay–Zichy-Ferraris Palace Baja

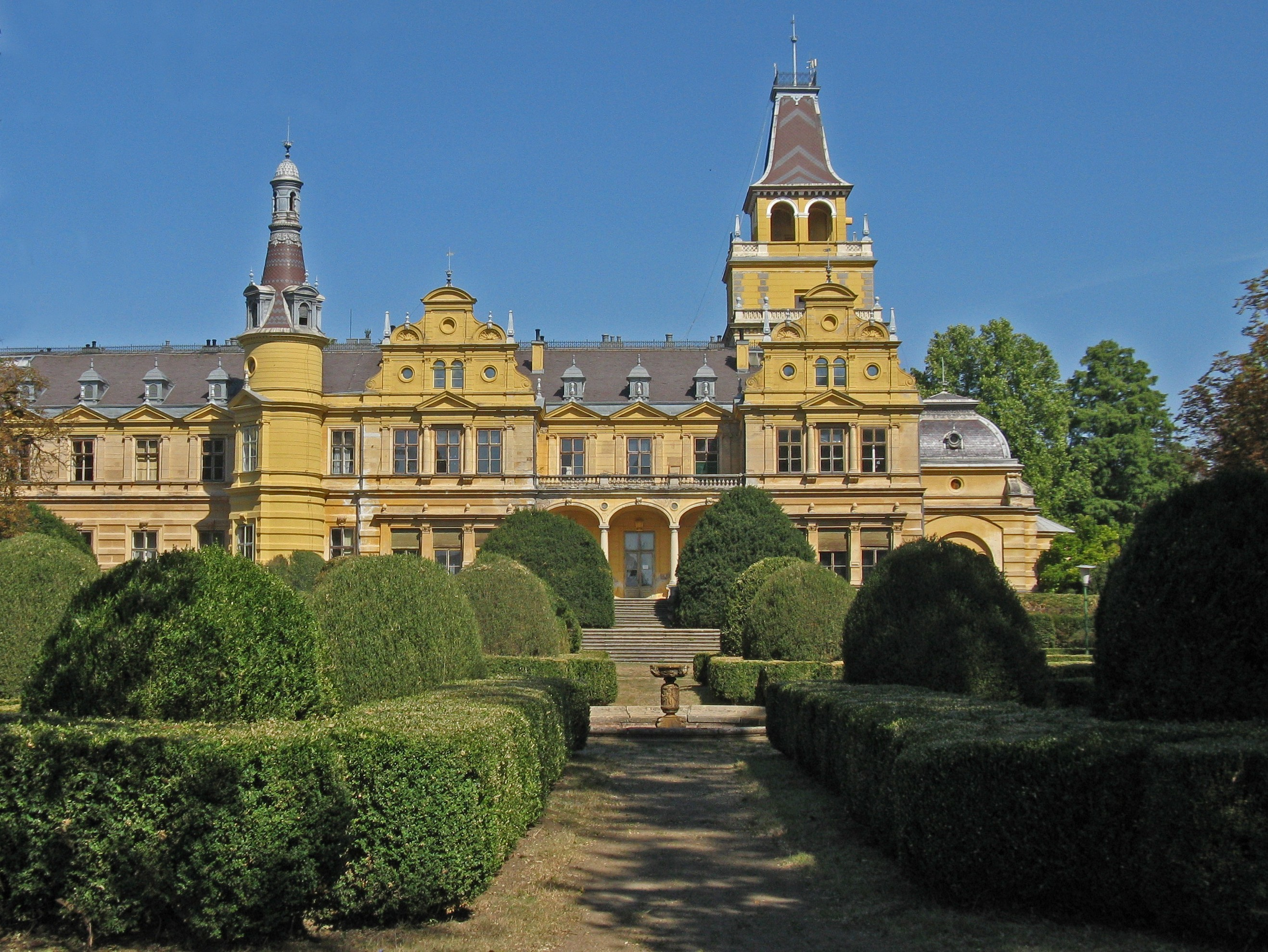
Wenckheim Palace in Szabadkígyós

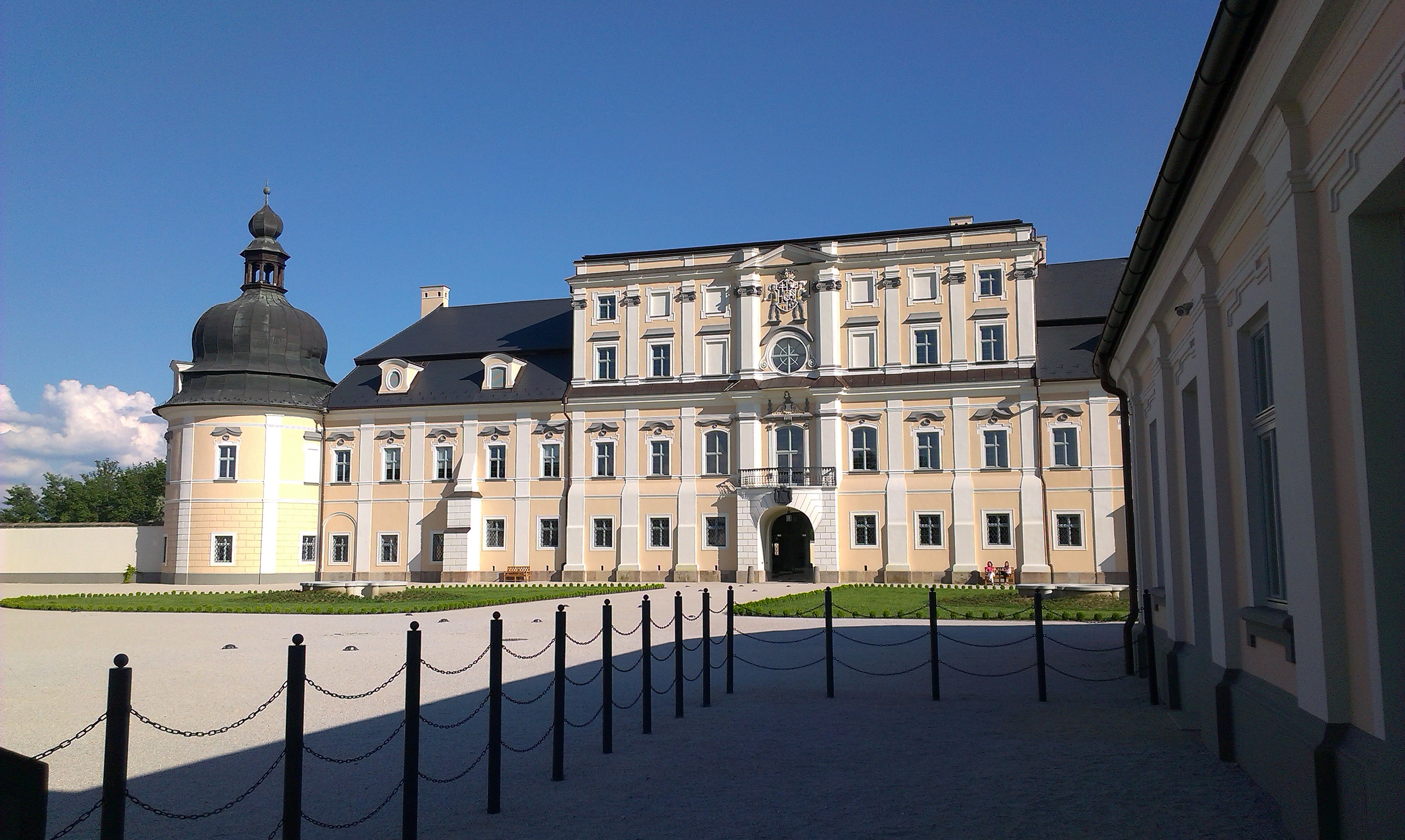
L'Huillier-Coburg Palace in Edelény

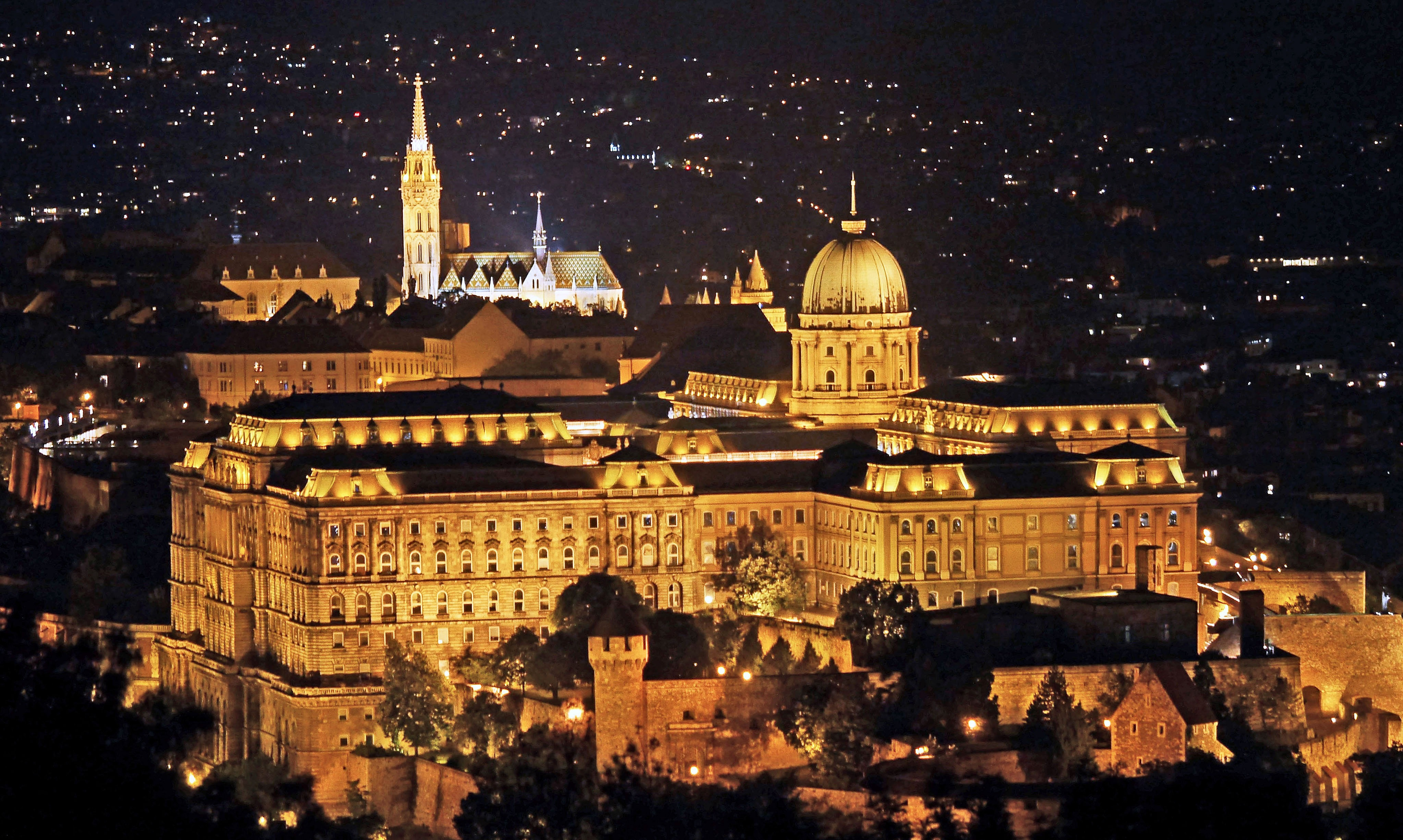
Royal Palace of Buda in Budapest

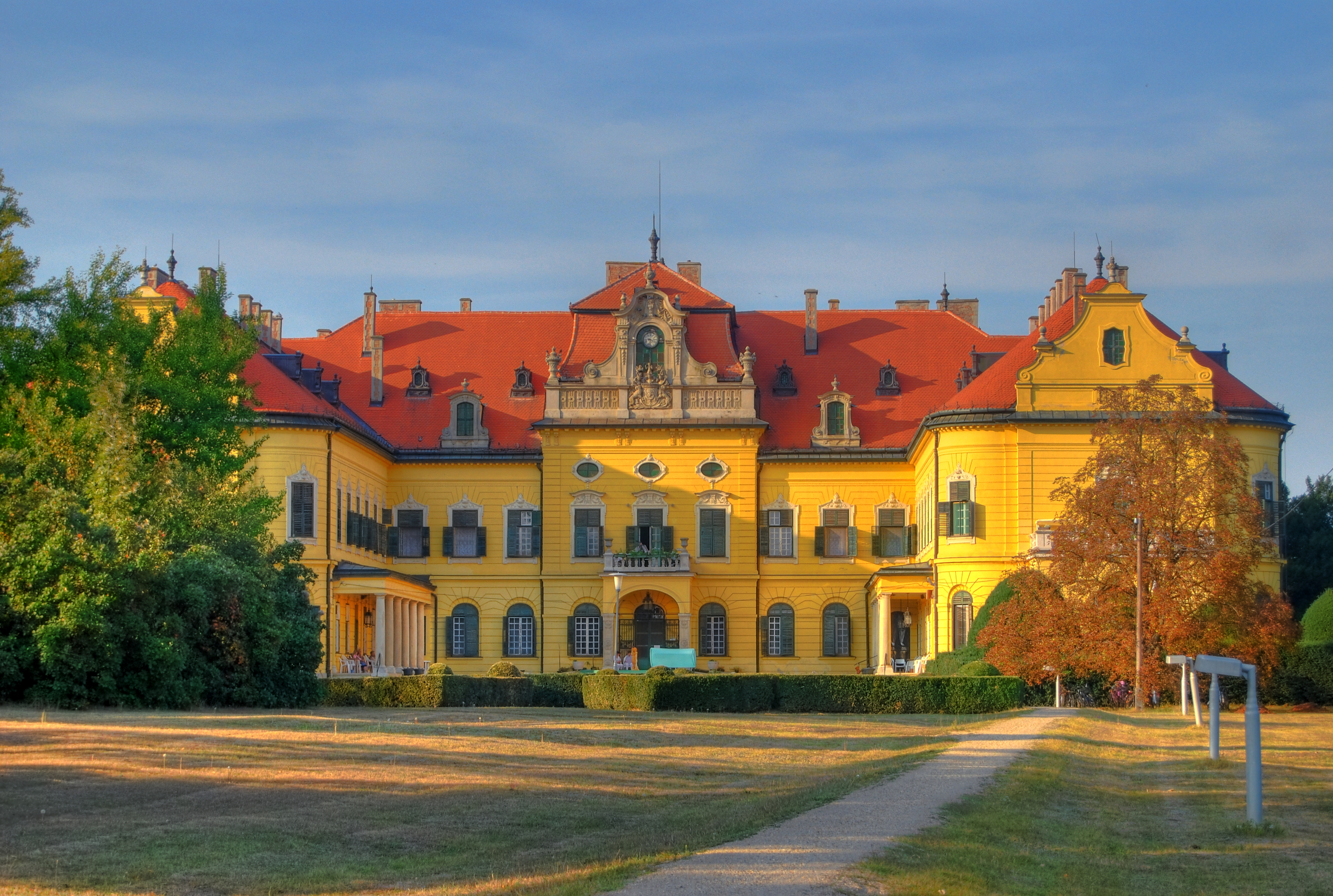
Károlyi Palace in Nagymágocs

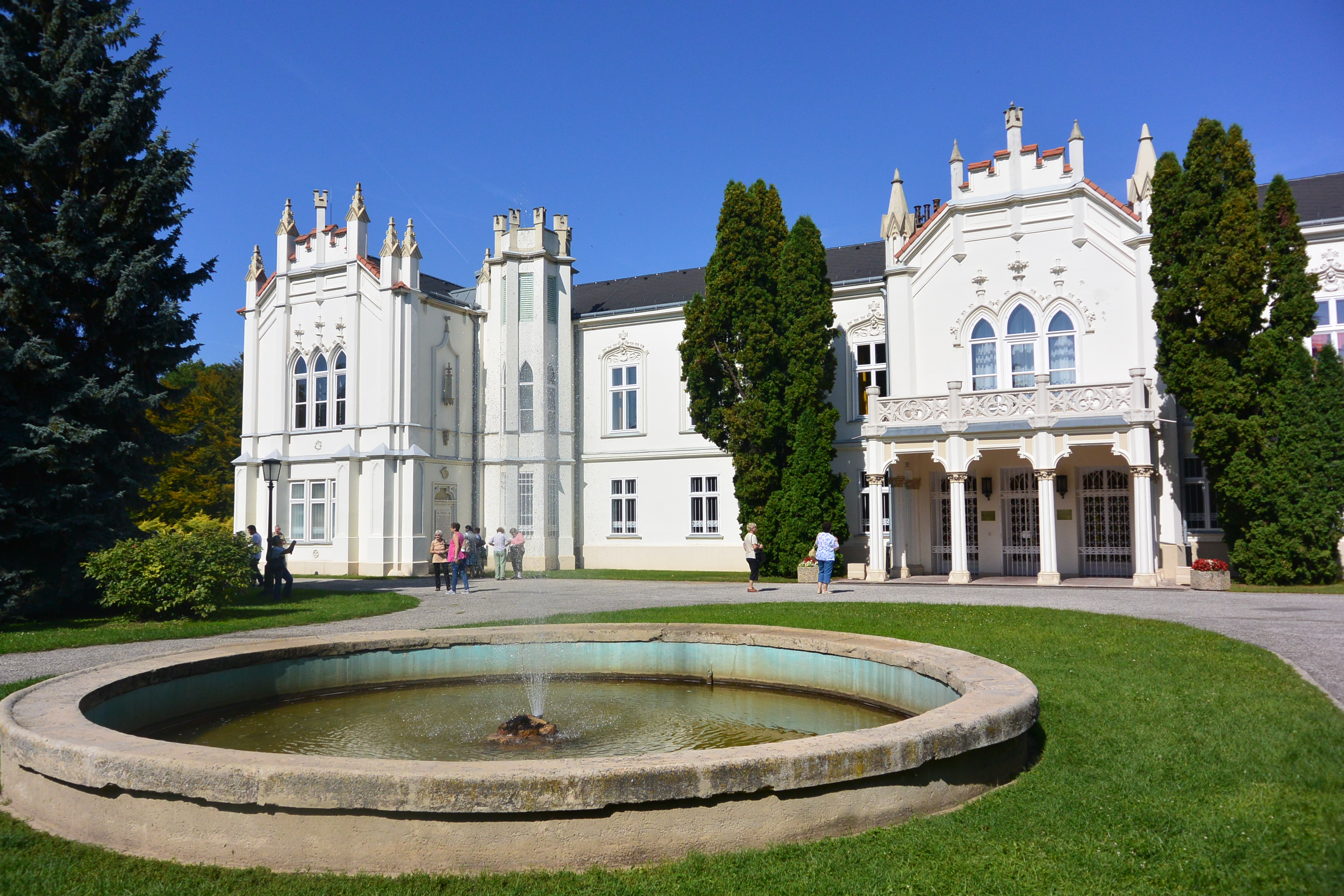
Brunszvik Mansion in Martonvásár

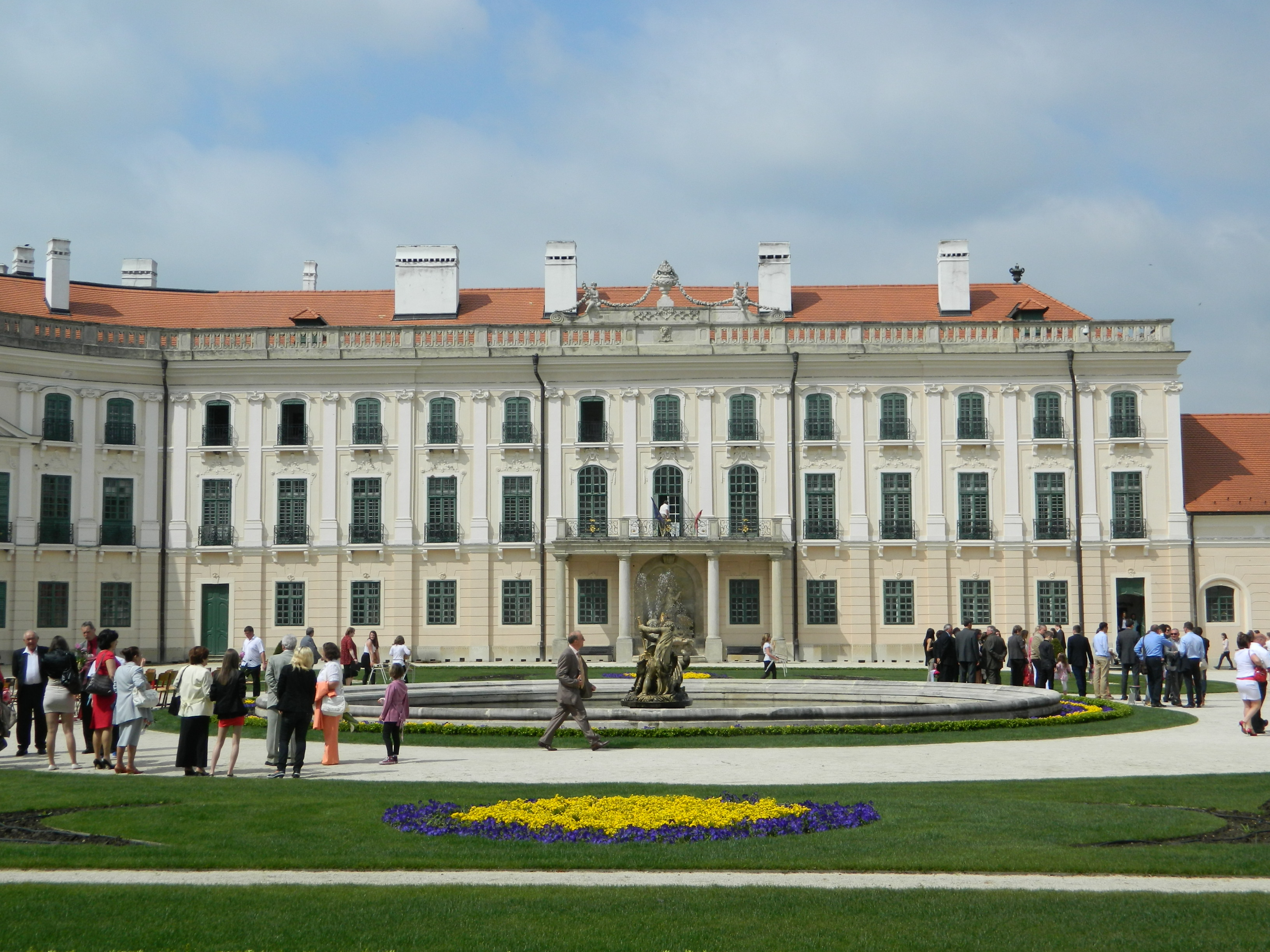
Eszterházy Palace in Eszterháza

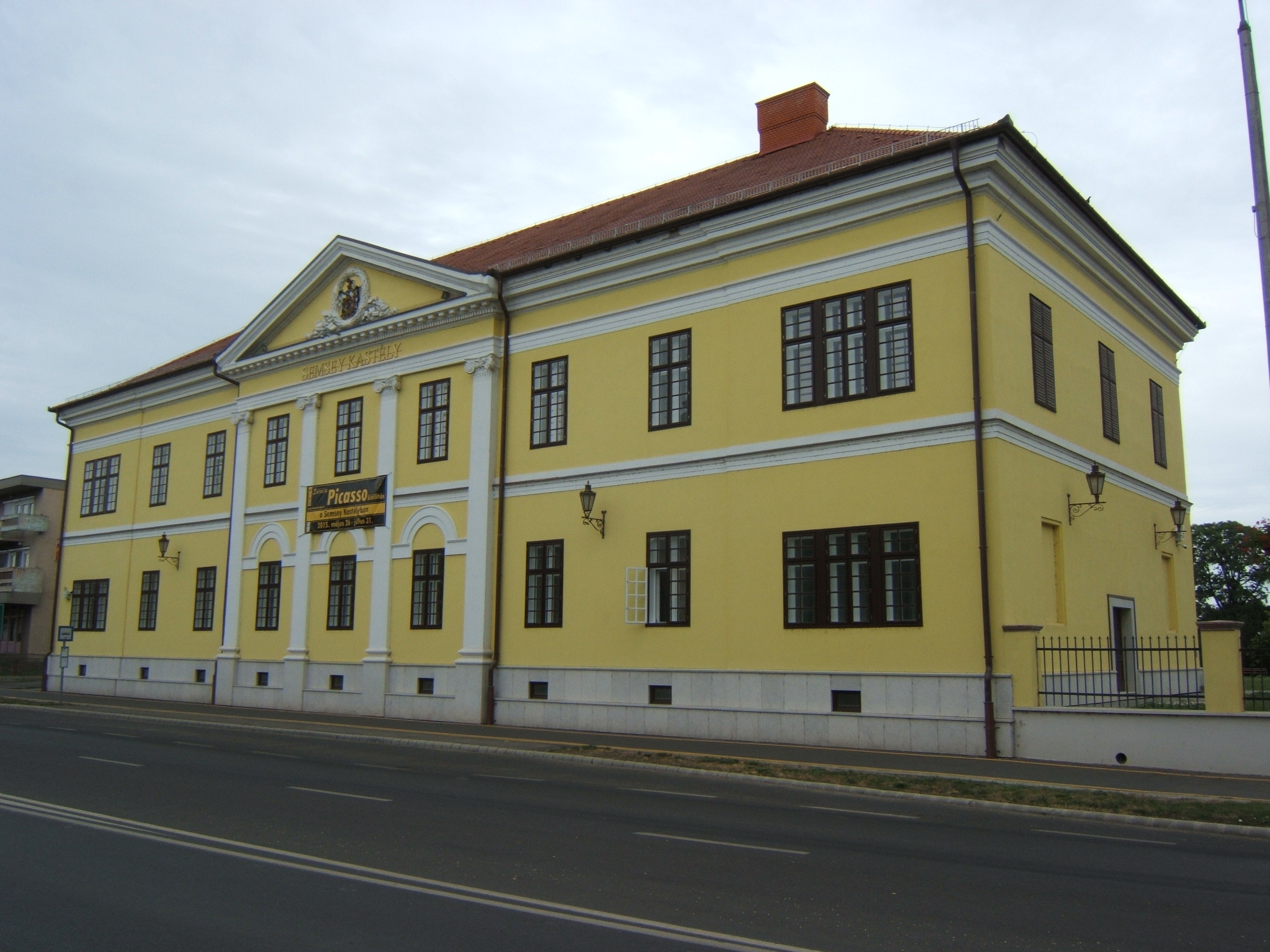
Semsey Mansion in Balmazújváros

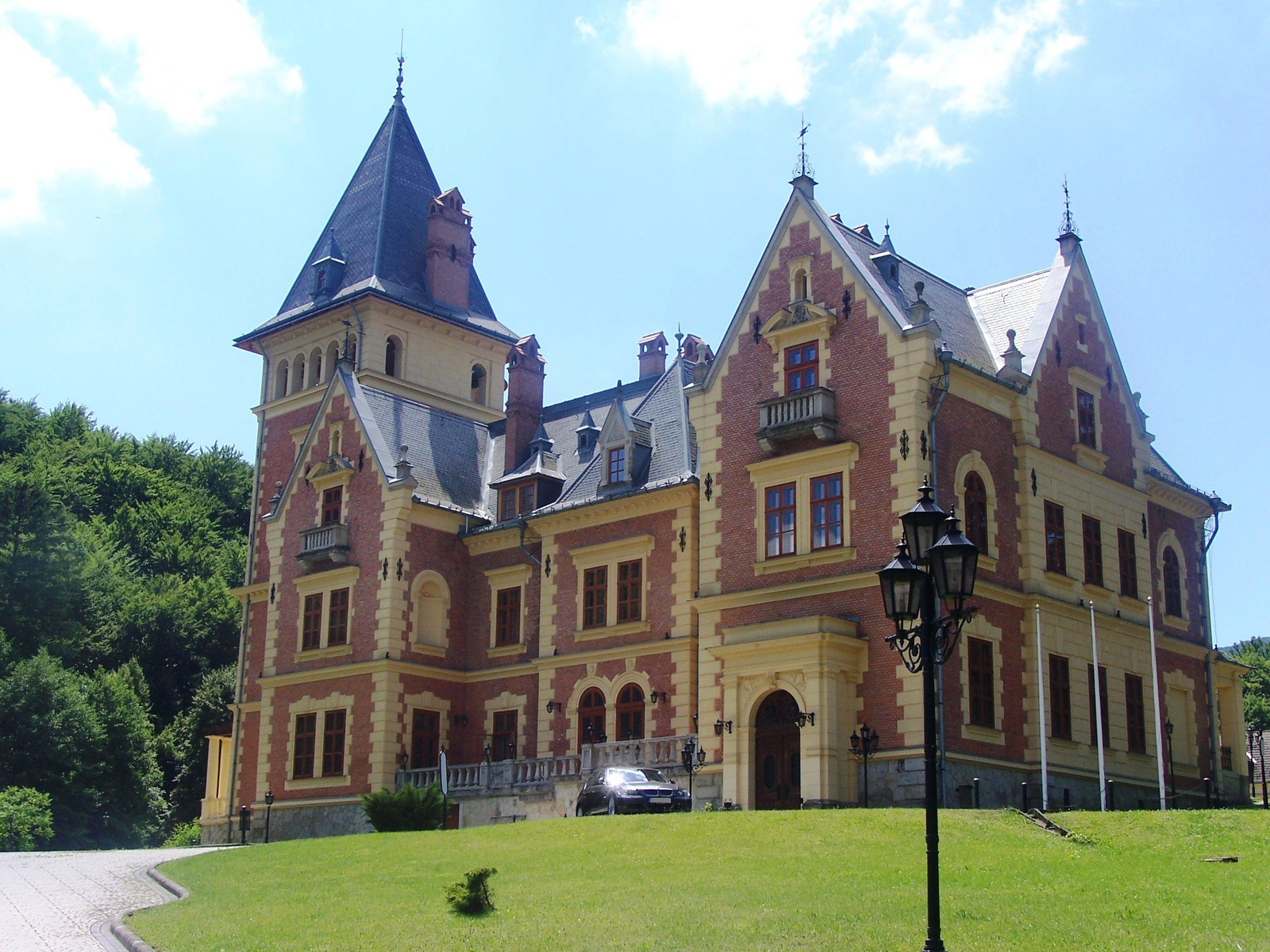
Károlyi Mansion in Parádsasvár

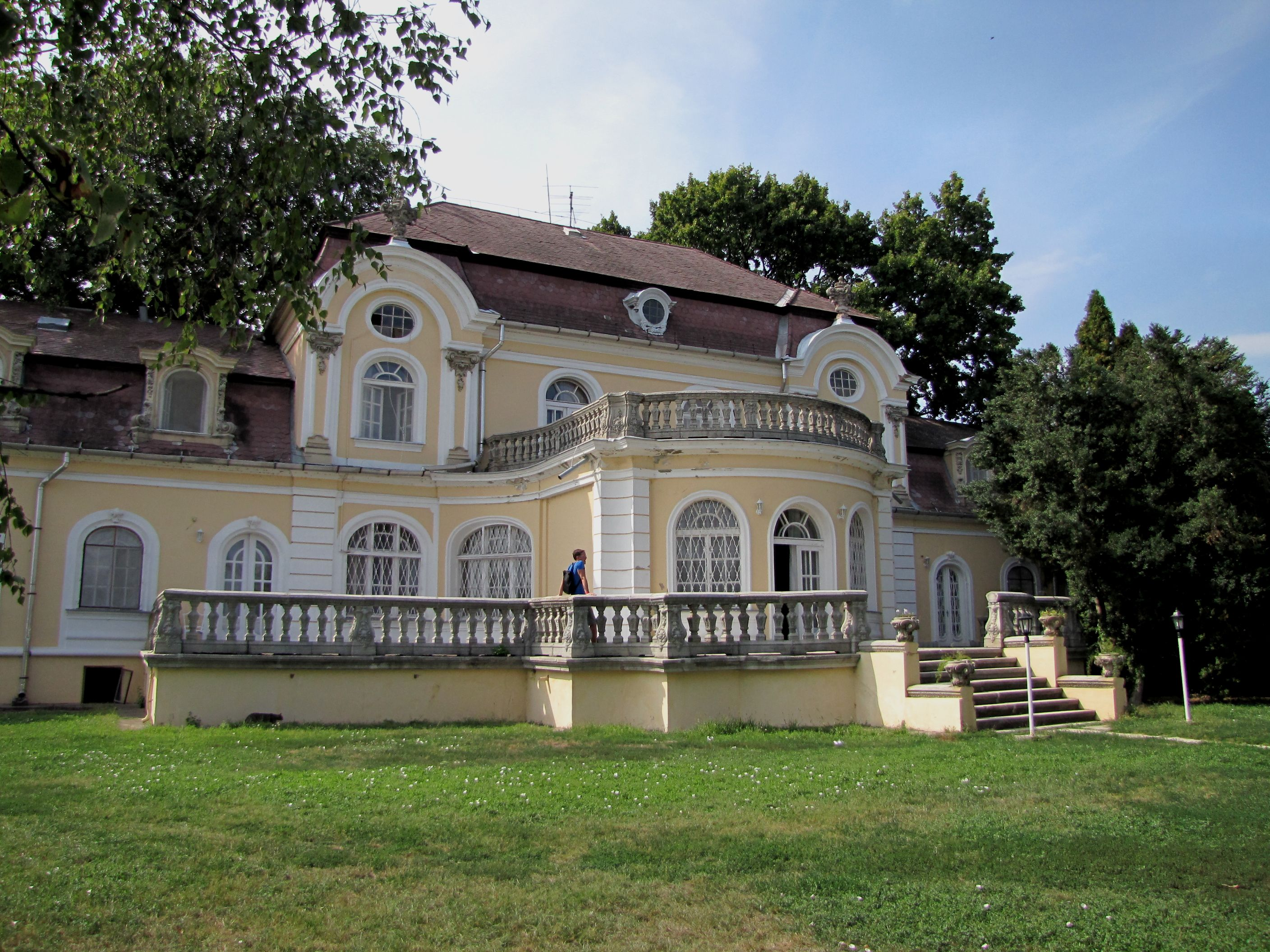
Horthy Mansion in Kenderes

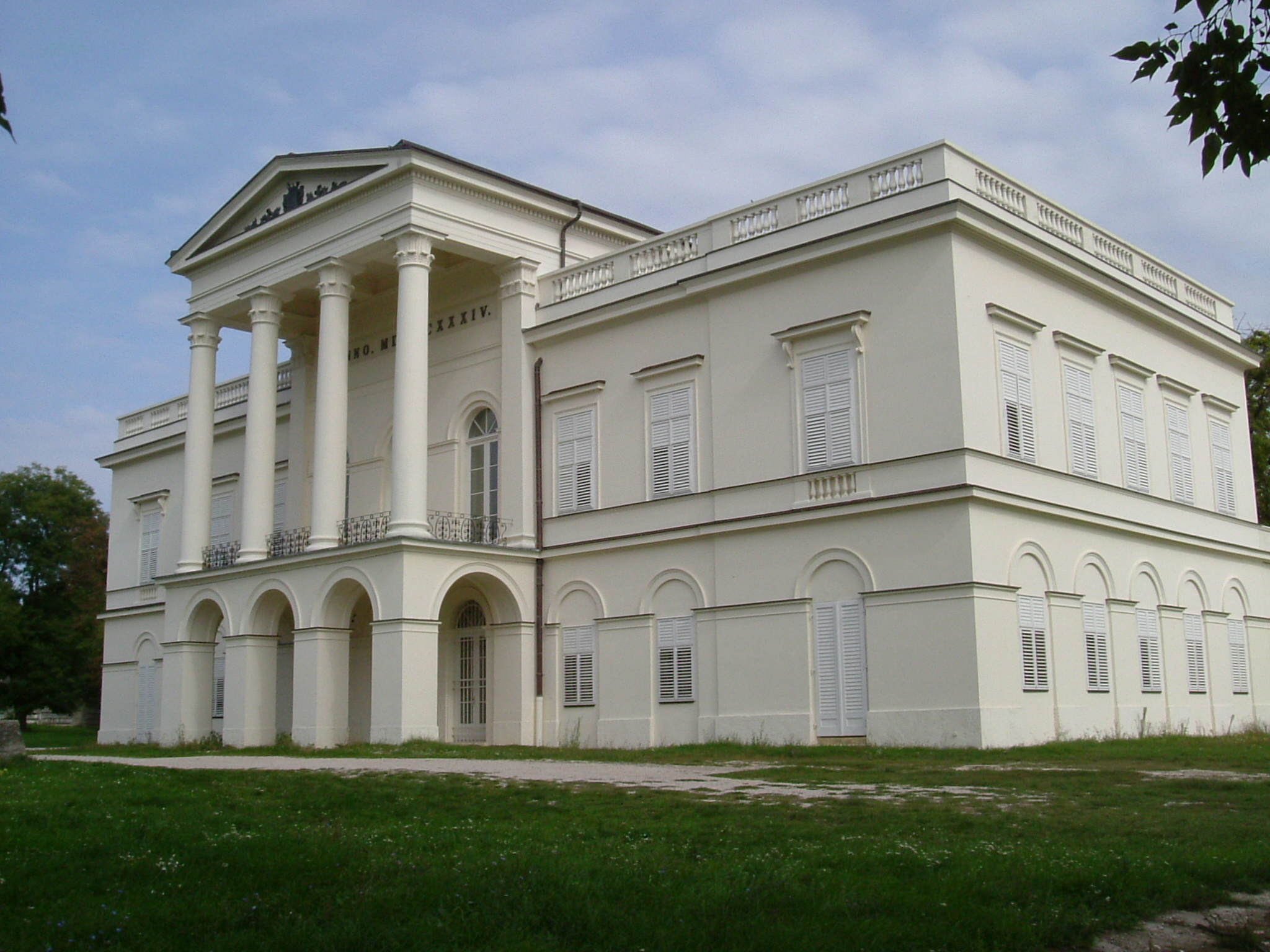
Sándor-Metternich Mansion in Bajna

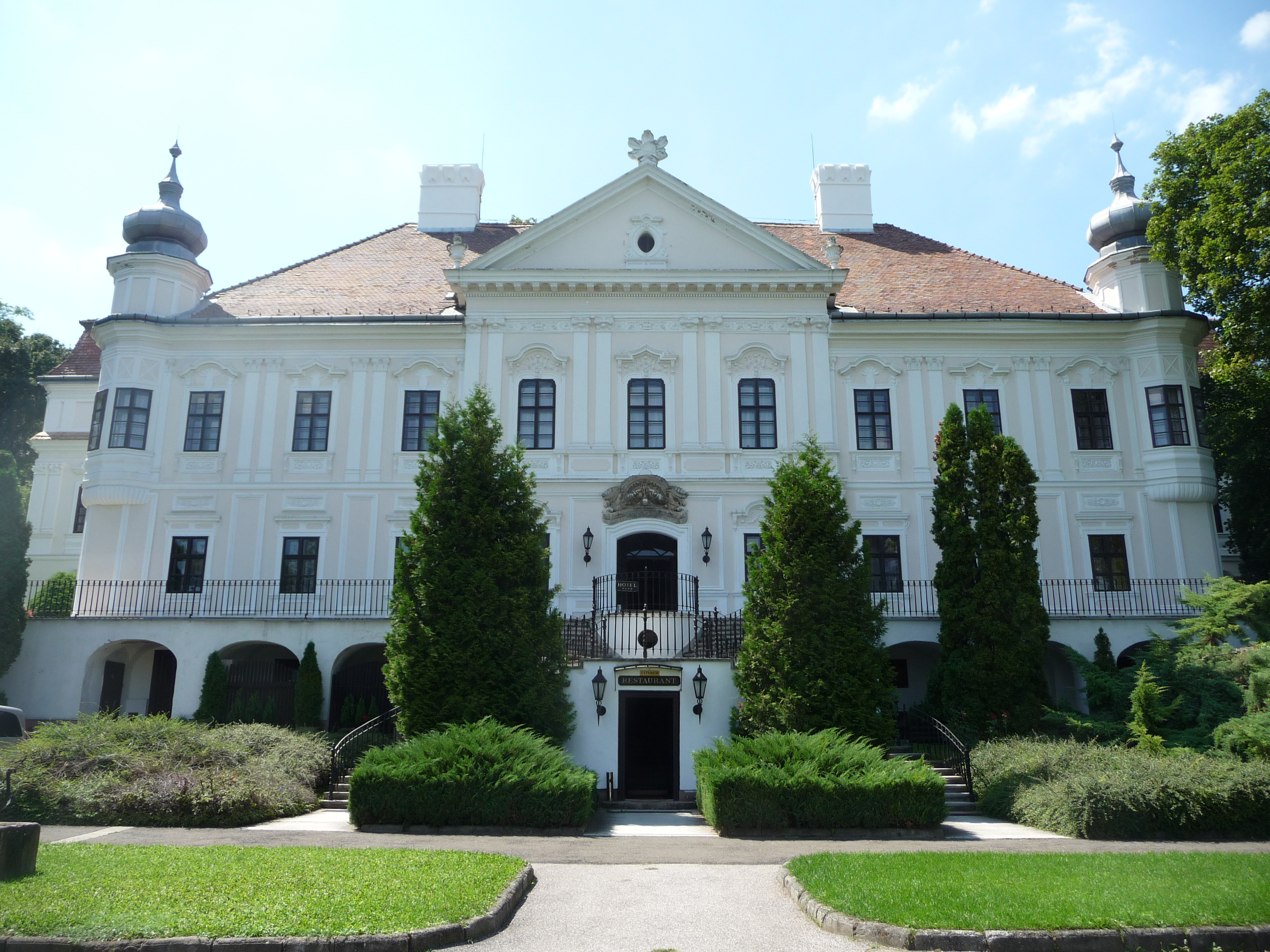
Teleki Palace in Szirák

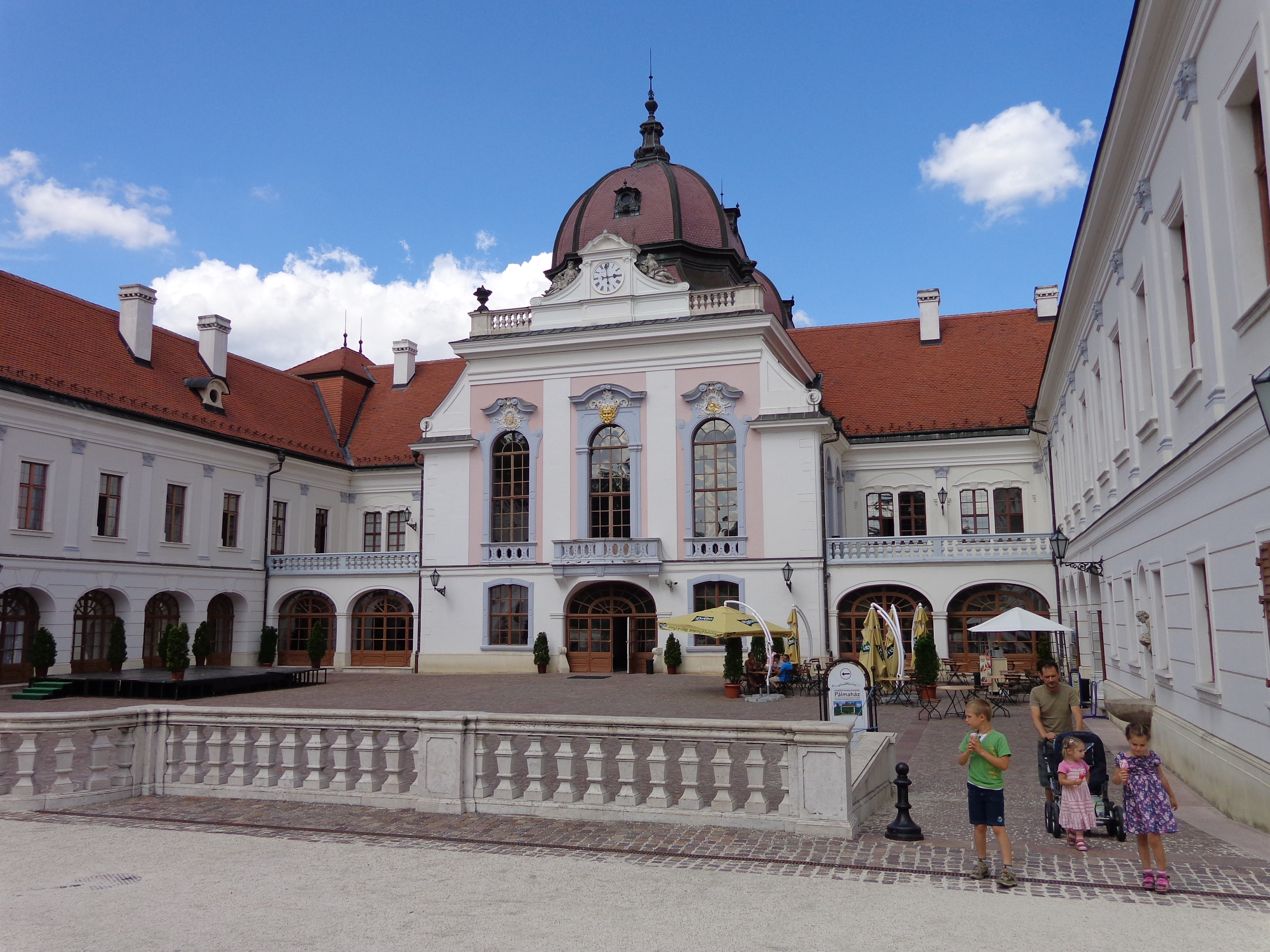
Royal Palace of Gödöllő

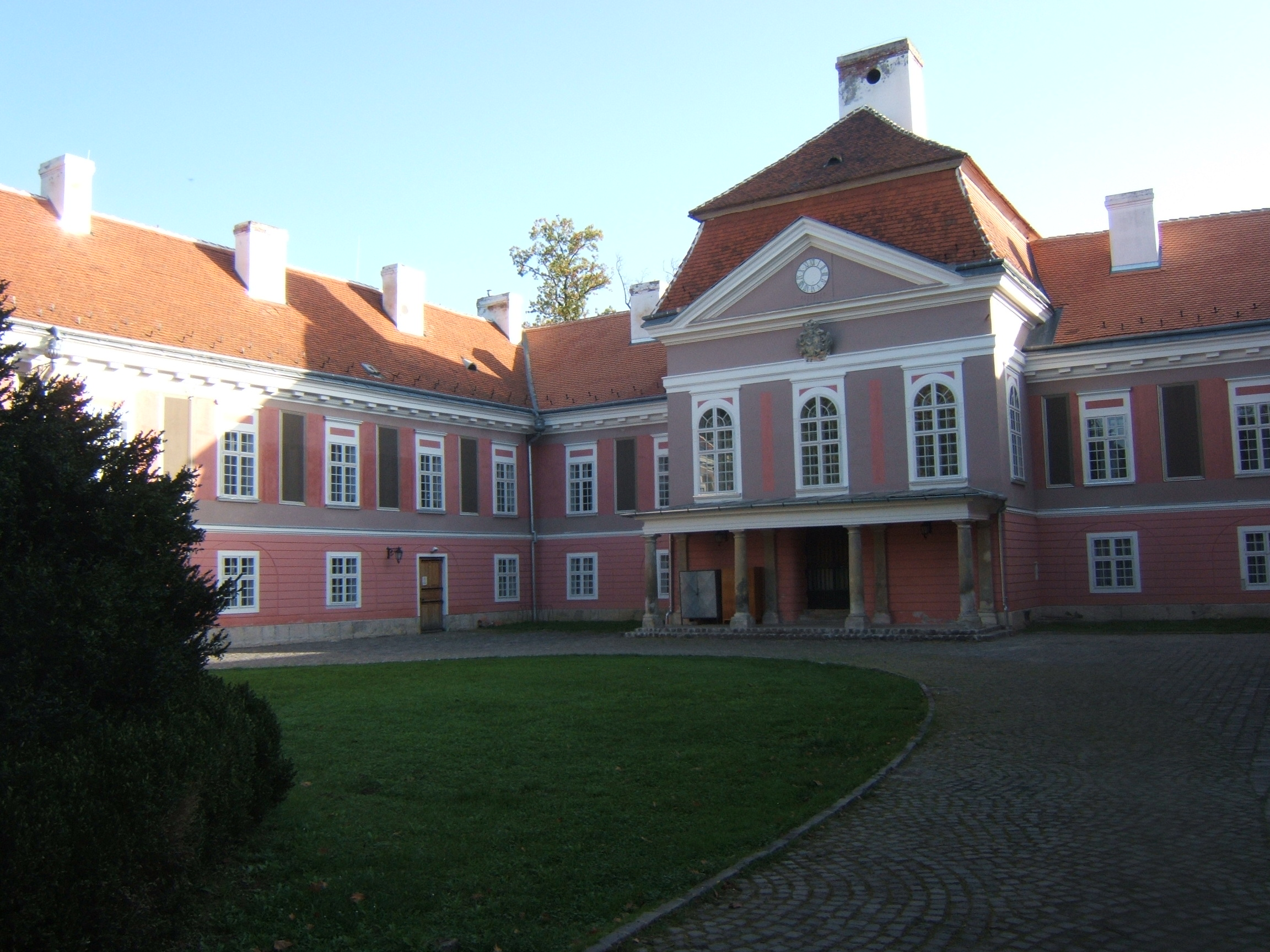
Inkey Palace in Iharosberény

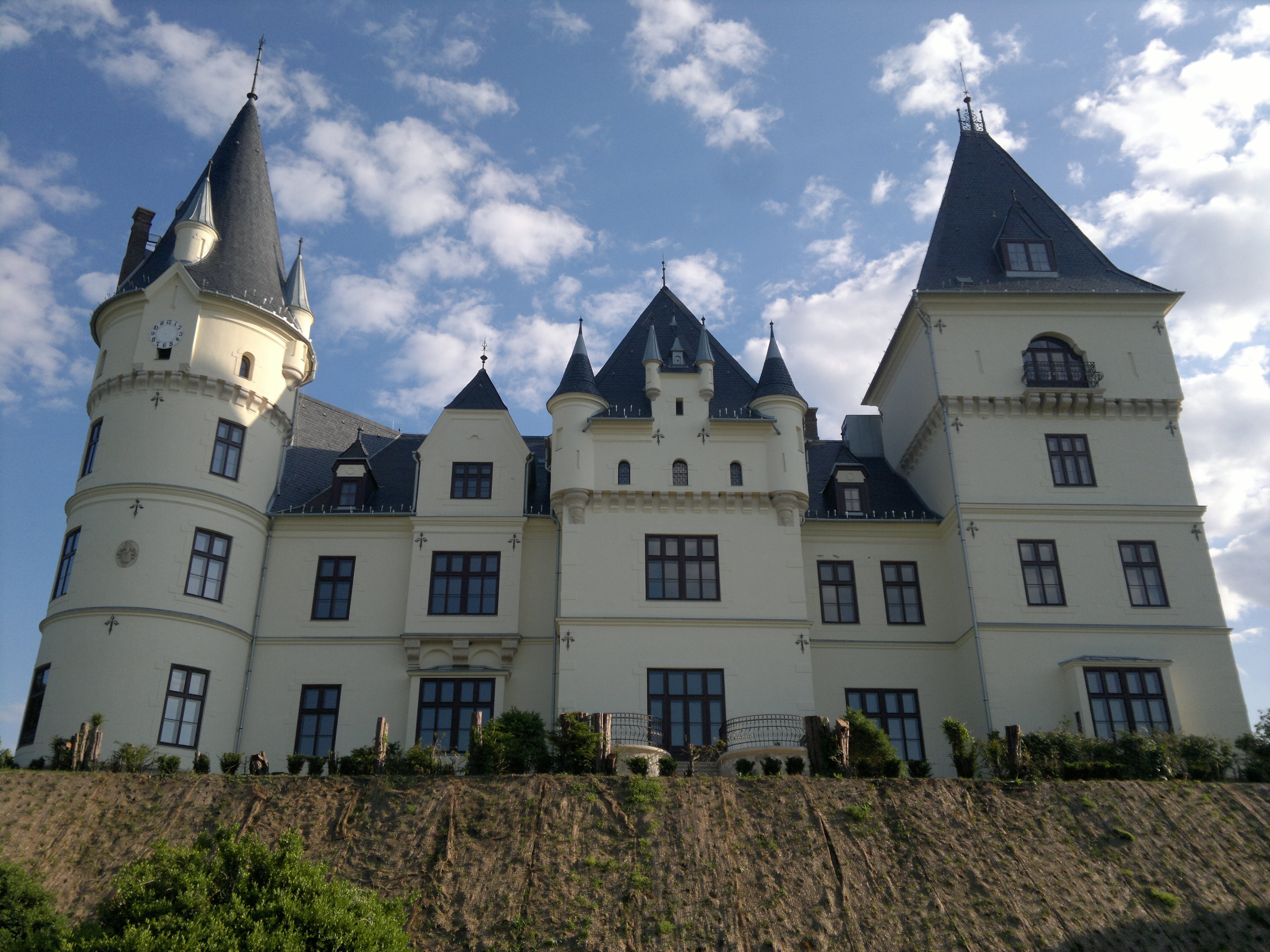
Andrássy Palace in Tiszadob

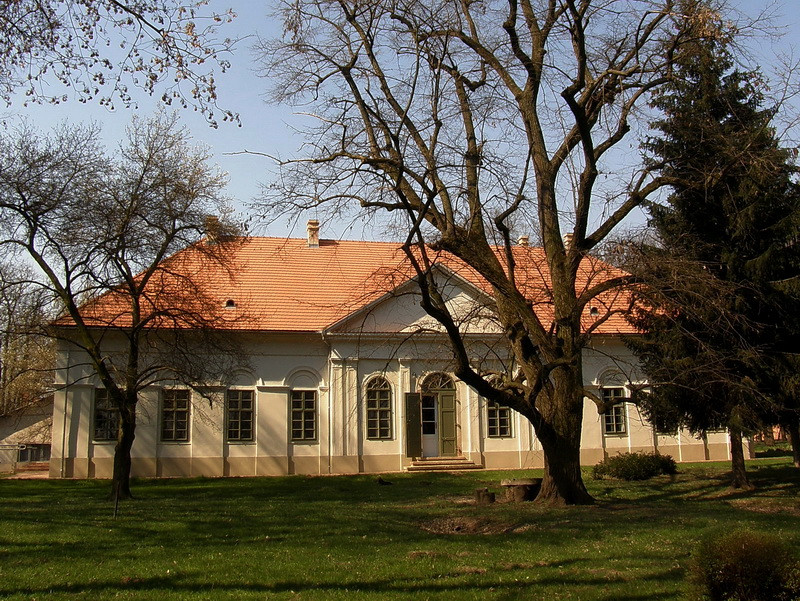
Gindly-Benyovszky Mansion in Tengelic

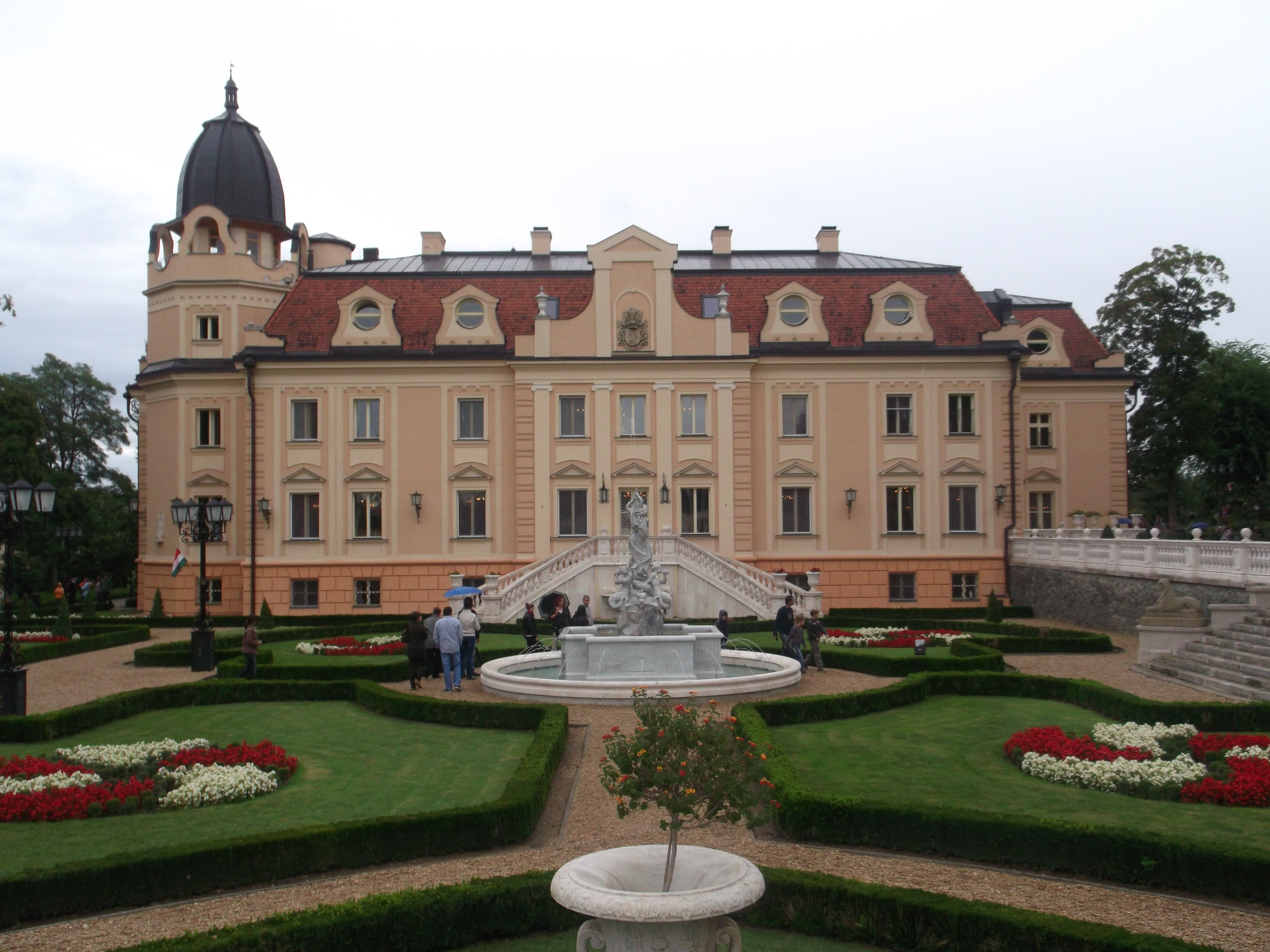
Szapáry Palace in Sorokpolány

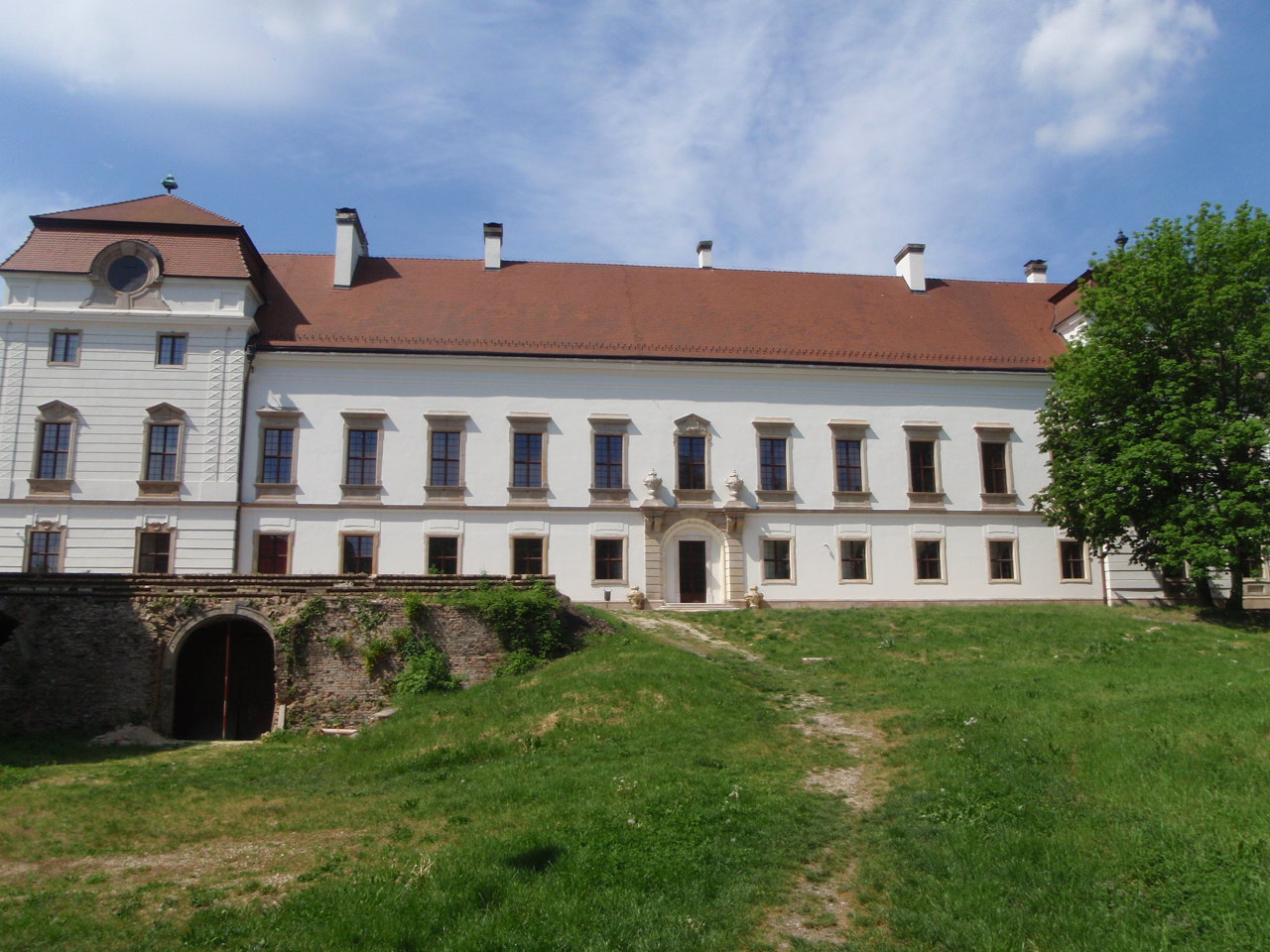
Eszterházy Palace in Pápa

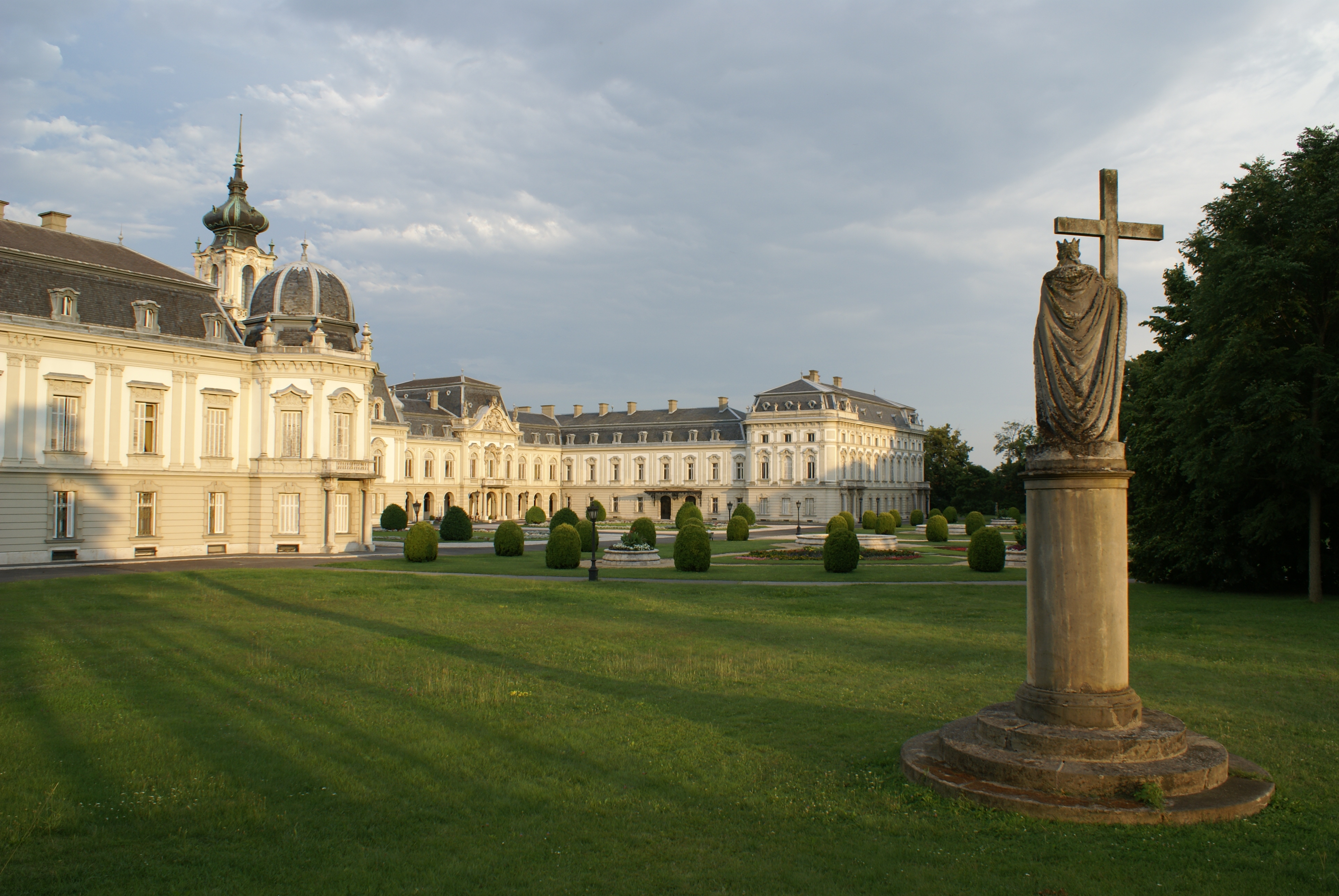
Festetics Palace in Keszthely

There are more than 2,000 palaces and mansions today in Hungary, with about 700 of them under protection. Palace construction thrived during the politically tranquil 18th century, which became one of the most important periods of construction in the history of the cultural development of the country. The style of these palaces and mansions varies according to age and region, but invariably they show their uniquely Hungarian character. In spite of being modeled sometimes on foreign examples and built by foreign masters, they still bear the stamp of a style rooted in the Hungarian way of life.

== History ==
=== 18th century ===
Throughout the Middle Ages, while the country struggled to survive wars followed by 150 years of Turkish occupation, most of the existing castles were destroyed and very few new were built. During the reign of Maria Theresa of Austria (ruled 1740 to 1780), the replacement of the destroyed or derelict castles and forts did not start in earnest before the end of the 18th century.

The wealth of Hungarian noble families like Eszterházy, Grassalkovich, Festetics, Batthyány, Pállfy, Károlyi and Erdődy grew during this period. Many aristocratic families used their wealth to develop their property through architecture. No longer desiring to live in the out-of-date forts built on top of hills, they chose the flat lands for their estates as locales for their splendid palaces.

The nobility loved arts and sciences and lived within fine social norms; this had significant influence on the building of the palaces. There are a lot of similar features in these buildings, which are now considered as Hungarian characteristics.

The picture of Hungarian palaces would not be complete without mentioning the surrounding gardens. Hungarian nobles planned their gardens after the parks of French palaces, the characteristics of which were orderliness, well arranged but with great variety. The baroque garden strove for order and union. Because of the narrower financial possibilities, Hungarian baroque parks are much more modest than foreign ones, and as the art of garden-building is the most fleeting art, today we can hardly find anything of the old splendor of these parks.

=== 19th century ===
The 19th century brought a new way of thinking. The English example can be felt in the social and political life of the country, and their influence is seen in the palaces of the nobility as well. Above all, the taste of the 19th century changed the style of the gardens; the natural beauty of the trees and bushes were back in fashion. Botanical interest came into prominence; it was fashionable to collect special and rare plants. After the monopoly of the baroque, the gardens reflected the idea of "back to nature", which warmly surround these Greek-style pure palaces.

=== Modern era ===
After the second World War the palaces, mansions and their beautiful gardens became mainly state or co-operative property. Most of them functions today as museums, houses of culture, schools, hotels, sanatoriums, or other public buildings.

== List of palaces and mansions in Hungary ==
This list of palaces (Hungarian: kastélyok, paloták) and mansions (Hungarian: kúriák, kiskastélyok) is ordered by county.

=== Győr–Moson–Sopron County ===
- Eszterházy Palace in Eszterháza

=== Hajdú–Bihar County ===
- Semsey Mansion in Balmazújváros

=== Heves County ===
- Károlyi Mansion in Parádsasvár

=== Jász-Nagykun-Szolnok County ===
- Horthy Mansion in Kenderes

=== Komárom-Esztergom County ===
- Sándor-Metternich Mansion in Bajna, Hungary

=== Nógrád County ===
- Teleki Palace in Szirák

=== Pest County ===
- Royal Palace of Gödöllő

=== Szabolcs-Szatmár-Bereg County ===
- Andrássy Palace in Tiszadob

=== Tolna County ===
- Gindly-Benyovszky Mansion in Tengelic

=== Vas County ===
- Szapáry Palace in Sorokpolány

=== Veszprém County ===
- Eszterházy Palace in Pápa

=== Zala County ===
- Festetics Palace in Keszthely

== See also ==
- List of castles in Hungary
