= Tengelic =

- Location of Tolna county in Hungary

- Location of Tengelic
- Coordinates: 46.52890°N 18.70930°E
- Country: Hungary
- County: Tolna

Area
  - Total: 70.93 km^{2} (27.39 sq mi)

Population (2004)
  - Total: 2,494
  - Density: 35.16/km^{2} (91.1/sq mi)
- Time zone: UTC+1 (CET)
  - Summer (DST): UTC+2 (CEST)
- Postal code: 7054
- Area code: 74

Tengelic is a village in Tolna County, Hungary.

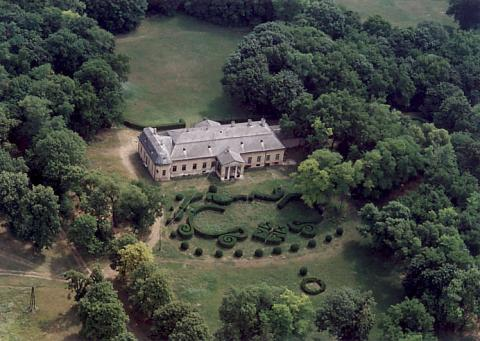
Aerial photography in Tengelic of de Benyó family Hunting Lodge
