= Sorokpolány =

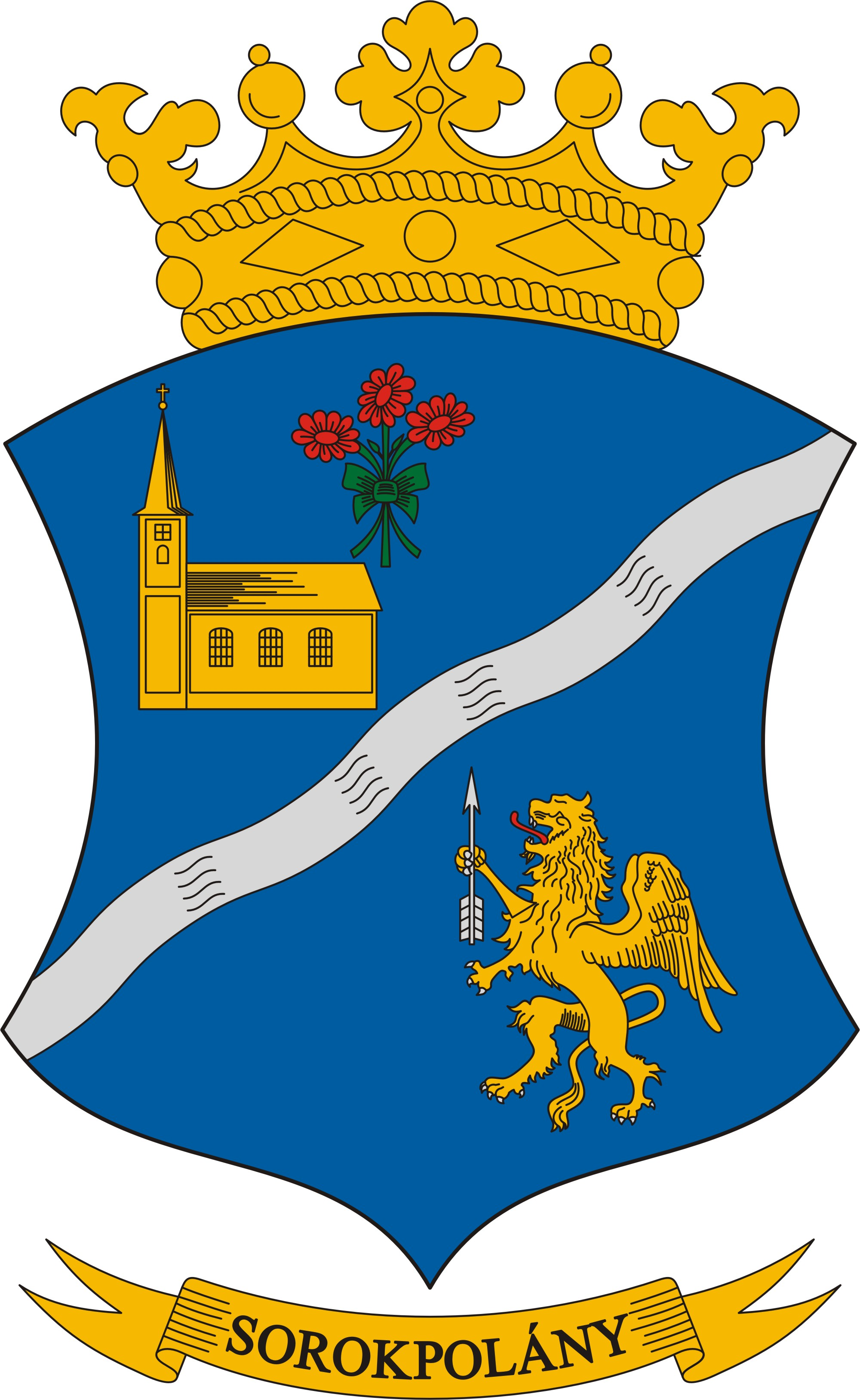
- Coat of arms

- Location of Sorokpolány in Hungary
- Coordinates: 47°08′10″N 16°40′18″E
- Country: Hungary
- Region: Western Transdanubia
- County: Vas
- Subregion: Szombathelyi
- Rank: Village

Area
  - Total: 13.29 km^{2} (5.13 sq mi)

Population (1 January 2008)
  - Total: 868
  - Density: 65.3/km^{2} (169/sq mi)
- Time zone: UTC+1 (CET)
  - Summer (DST): UTC+2 (CEST)
- Postal code: 9773
- Area code: +36 94
- KSH code: 29692
- Website: www.sorokpolany.hu

Sorokpolány is a village in Vas county, Hungary.
