= List of populated places in Hungary (J) =

This is a list of cities, towns and villages of Hungary

KEY: T = Town ; V = Village

Name	Rank	County	District	Population	Post code
Jágónak	V	Tolna	Dombóvári	301	7362
Ják	V	Vas	Szombathelyi	2,442	9798
Jakabszállás	V	Bács-Kiskun	Kecskeméti	2,619	6078
Jákfa	V	Vas	Sárvári	545	9643
Jákfalva	V	Borsod-Abaúj-Zemplén	Kazincbarcikai	465	3721
Jákó	V	Somogy	Kaposvári	687	7525
Jánd	V	Szabolcs-Szatmár-Bereg	Vásárosnaményi	851	4841
Jánkmajtis	V	Szabolcs-Szatmár-Bereg	Fehérgyarmati	1,732	4741
Jánoshalma	T	Bács-Kiskun	Jánoshalmi	9,784	6440
Jánosháza	T	Vas	Celldömölki	2,750	9545
Jánoshida	V	Jász-Nagykun-Szolnok	Jászberényi	2,725	5143
Jánossomorja	V	Gyor-Moson-Sopron	Mosonmagyaróvári	6,001	9241
Járdánháza	V	Borsod-Abaúj-Zemplén	Ózdi	1,942	3664
Jármi	V	Szabolcs-Szatmár-Bereg	Mátészalkai	1,350	4337
Jásd	V	Veszprém	Zirci	839	8424
Jászágó	V	Jász-Nagykun-Szolnok	Jászberényi	776	5124
Jászalsószentgyörgy	V	Jász-Nagykun-Szolnok	Jászberényi	3,801	5054
Jászapáti	T	Jász-Nagykun-Szolnok	Jászberényi	9,913	5130
Jászárokszállás	T	Jász-Nagykun-Szolnok	Jászberényi	8,267	5123
Jászberény	T	Jász-Nagykun-Szolnok	Jászberényi	28,078	5100
Jászboldogháza	V	Jász-Nagykun-Szolnok	Jászberényi	1,830	5144
Jászdózsa	V	Jász-Nagykun-Szolnok	Jászberényi	2,286	5122
Jászfelsoszentgyörgy	V	Jász-Nagykun-Szolnok	Jászberényi	1,821	5111
Jászfényszaru	T	Jász-Nagykun-Szolnok	Jászberényi	5,887	5126
Jászivány	V	Jász-Nagykun-Szolnok	Jászberényi	429	5135
Jászjákóhalma	V	Jász-Nagykun-Szolnok	Jászberényi	3,125	5121
Jászkarajeno	V	Pest	Ceglédi	2,972	2746
Jászkisér	V	Jász-Nagykun-Szolnok	Jászberényi	5,773	5137
Jászladány	V	Jász-Nagykun-Szolnok	Jászberényi	6,296	5055
Jászszentandrás	V	Jász-Nagykun-Szolnok	Jászberényi	2,688	5136
Jászszentlászló	V	Bács-Kiskun	Kiskunfélegyházi	2,629	6133
Jásztelek	V	Jász-Nagykun-Szolnok	Jászberényi	1,770	5141
Jéke	V	Szabolcs-Szatmár-Bereg	Kisvárdai	734	4611
Jenő	V	Fejér	Székesfehérvári	1,302	8146
Jobaháza	V	Gyor-Moson-Sopron	Csornai	567	9323
Jobbágyi	V	Nógrád	Pásztói	2,401	3063
Jósvafo	V	Borsod-Abaúj-Zemplén	Edelényi	322	3758
Juta	V	Somogy	Kaposvári	1,161	7431

== Notes ==
- Cities marked with * have several different post codes, the one here is only the most general one.
