= Jászság =

Historical Jassic region of east-central Hungary

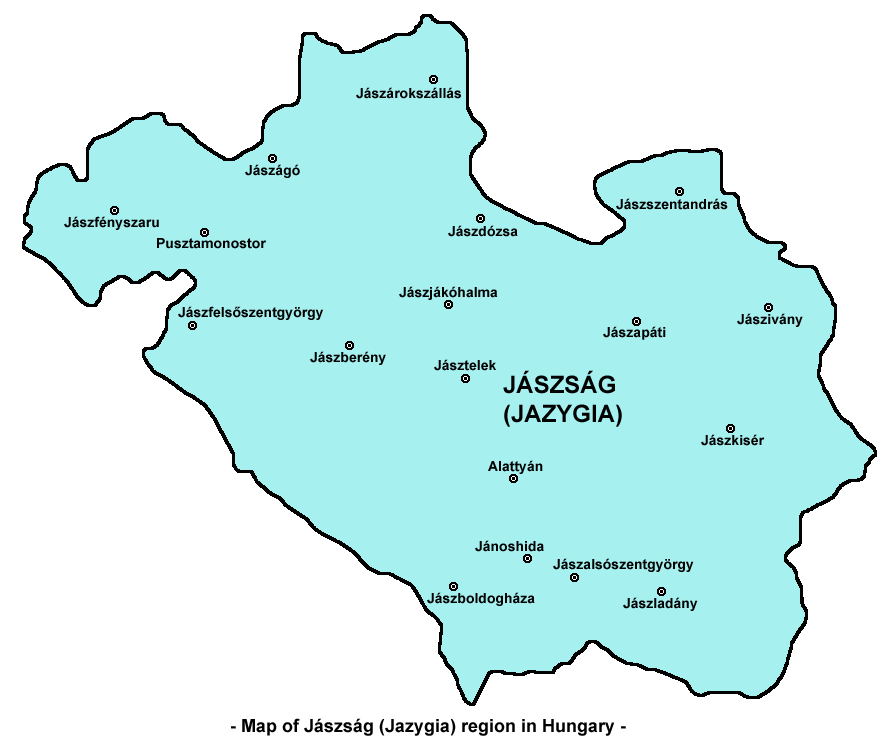
Map of Jászság

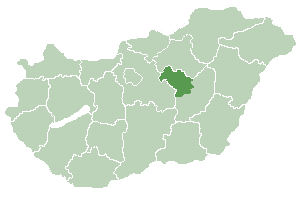
Jászság within modern Hungary

Jászság ("Jaszygia", Latin: Jazigia) is a historical, ethnographical and geographical region in Hungary. Its 1,161 km^{2} (448 sq mi) territory is situated in the north-western part of the Jász-Nagykun-Szolnok county. The main town in the region is Jászberény. Jászság is inhabited by the Jassic people, an Iranian ethnic group whose linguistic base is preserved by the Ossetians. The population of the region is around 85,000.

== Name ==
Jászság means "Province of the Jász" (i.e. Province of the Jassic people).

== History ==
In ancient times, this area was settled by Celts, Dacians, Sarmatians, and Germanic peoples. It was part of the Dacian Kingdom of Burebista in the first century BC. In the 1st century AD, a Sarmatian tribe known as the Iazyges settled in this region. In the early Middle Ages, the territory of present-day Jászság was mainly populated by Slavic people and was part of the Hun Empire, the Kingdom of the Gepids and the Kingdom of the Avars. At the end of the 9th century, the area was settled by the Hungarians and was subsequently included into the medieval Kingdom of Hungary. In the 11th century, the territory of present-day Jászság was part of the Újvár County, while in the 12th century, it was divided between Hevesújvár and Pest counties.

Jászság (in orange) and the two other components of Jászkunság district, ca. 1800: Little Cumania in dark green, Greater Cumania in lime

The Mongol invasions of the 13th century and Tamerlane's wars in the 14th century proved fatal to the Alan state and a group of Alans migrated with the Qipchaqs (Comani, Cumans) into Central Europe, settling in the medieval Kingdom of Hungary in the 13th century. The territory where they settled is to this day called Jászság — "the province of the Ossetians". They preserved their Iranian language and ethnic identity until the 15th century, but gradually adopted the Hungarian language and became assimilated into Hungarians. However, they preserved their Jassic identity and their regional autonomy.

Until the Ottoman conquest in the 16th century, Jászság was an autonomous territory of the Kingdom of Hungary. Following the Battle of Mohács (1526) the region was included in the Eastern Hungarian Kingdom and later was annexed by the Ottoman Empire. During Ottoman administration in the 16th-17th centuries, the territory of present-day Jászság was initially part of the Budin Eyalet and later part of the Eğri Eyalet. At the end of the 17th century, the Ottoman Empire ceded the area to the Habsburg monarchy and an autonomous region of Jászság was restored within the Habsburg Kingdom of Hungary. The region preserved its regional autonomy until 1876, when it was included into Jász-Nagykun-Szolnok County. After the dissolution of the Habsburg monarchy in 1918, the region of Jászság became part of an independent Hungary.

== Settlements ==
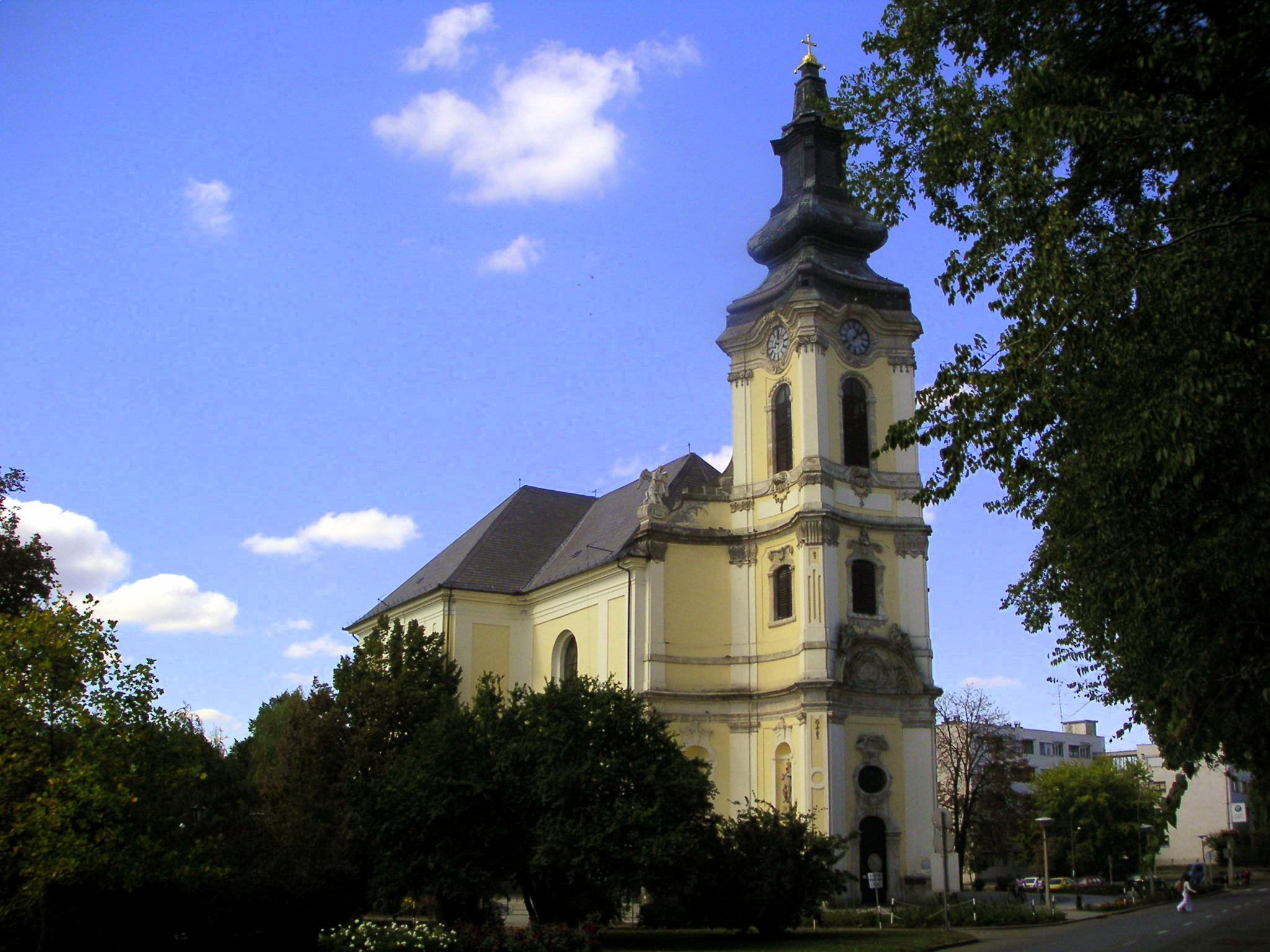
The main church in the center of Jászberény

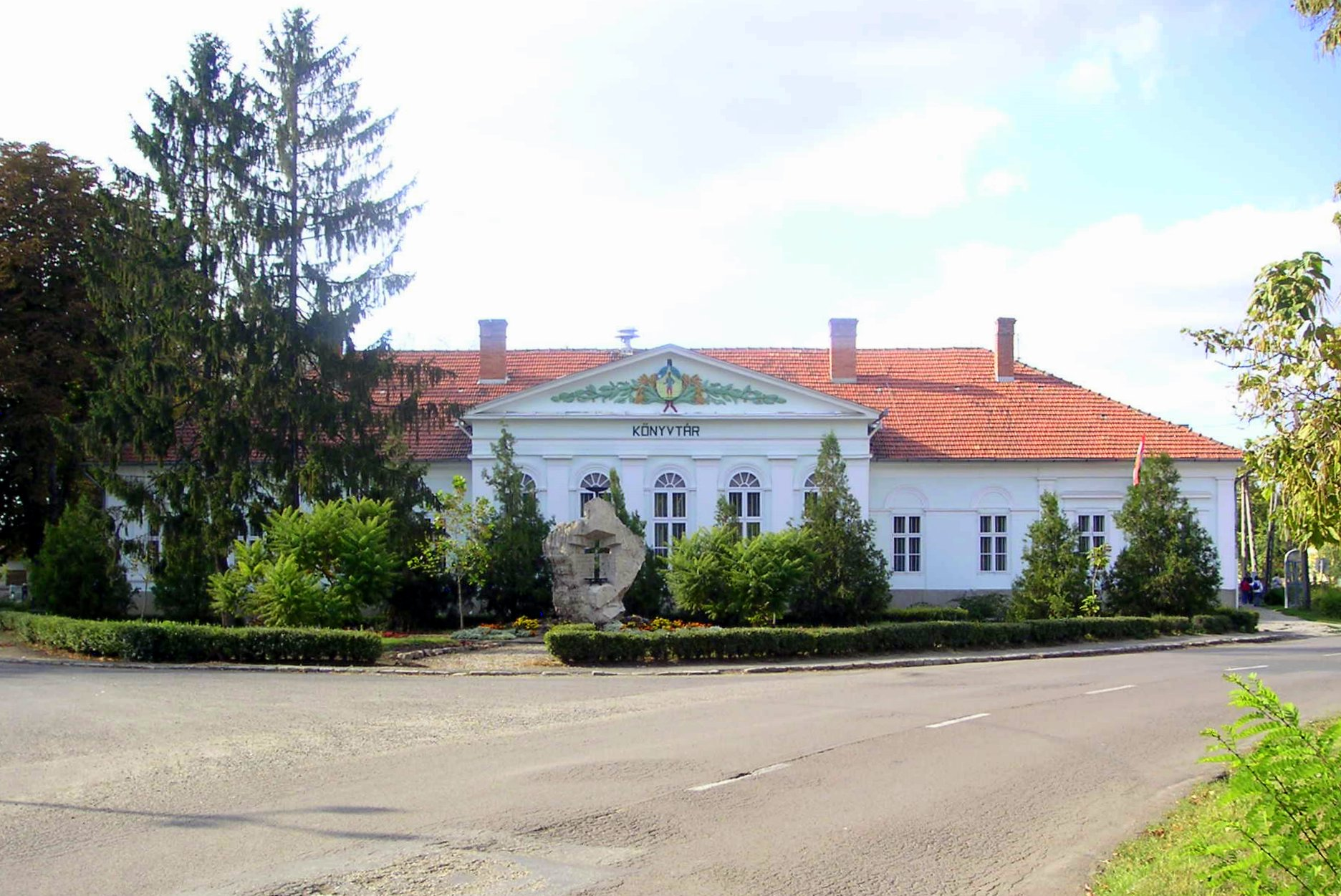
Jászapáti library

There are 18 settlements in Jászság:

- Jászberény (cultural and economic center)
- Jászapáti
- Jászárokszállás
- Jászfényszaru
- Jászladány
- Jászkisér
- Jászalsószentgyörgy
- Jászfelsőszentgyörgy
- Jászboldogháza
- Jászdózsa
- Jászjákóhalma
- Jásztelek
- Jászszentandrás
- Jászágó
- Jászivány
- Alattyán
- Jánoshida
- Pusztamonostor

== See also ==
- Kunság
