= Béla Bodonyi =

Hungarian footballer

Personal information
- Date of birth: 14 December 1956 (age 69)
- Place of birth: Jászdózsa, Hungary
- Height: 1.71 m (5 ft 7 1/2 in)
- Position: Striker

Senior career*
Years	Team	Apps	(Gls)
1974–1976	Debrecen		
1976–1987	Budapest Honvéd		
1987–1988	Debrecen		
1988–1993	FC Bulle		
1993–1994	FC Fribourg		
1994–2000	FC Bulle		

International career
1979–1985	Hungary	27	(5)
- * Club domestic league appearances and goals

Béla Bodonyi (born 14 December 1956) is a Hungarian former footballer who played at both professional and international levels as a striker.

== Career ==
Born in Jászdózsa, Bodonyi played club football in both Hungary and Switzerland for Debrecen, Budapest Honvéd and FC Bulle.

He also earned 27 caps for the Hungary national team between 1979 and 1985, representing them at the 1982 FIFA World Cup.
