= Jászapáti District =

Coordinates: 47.51280047728824°N 20.141272998134898°E

Jászapáti District Jászapáti járás
- Districts of Hungary
- Coat of arms

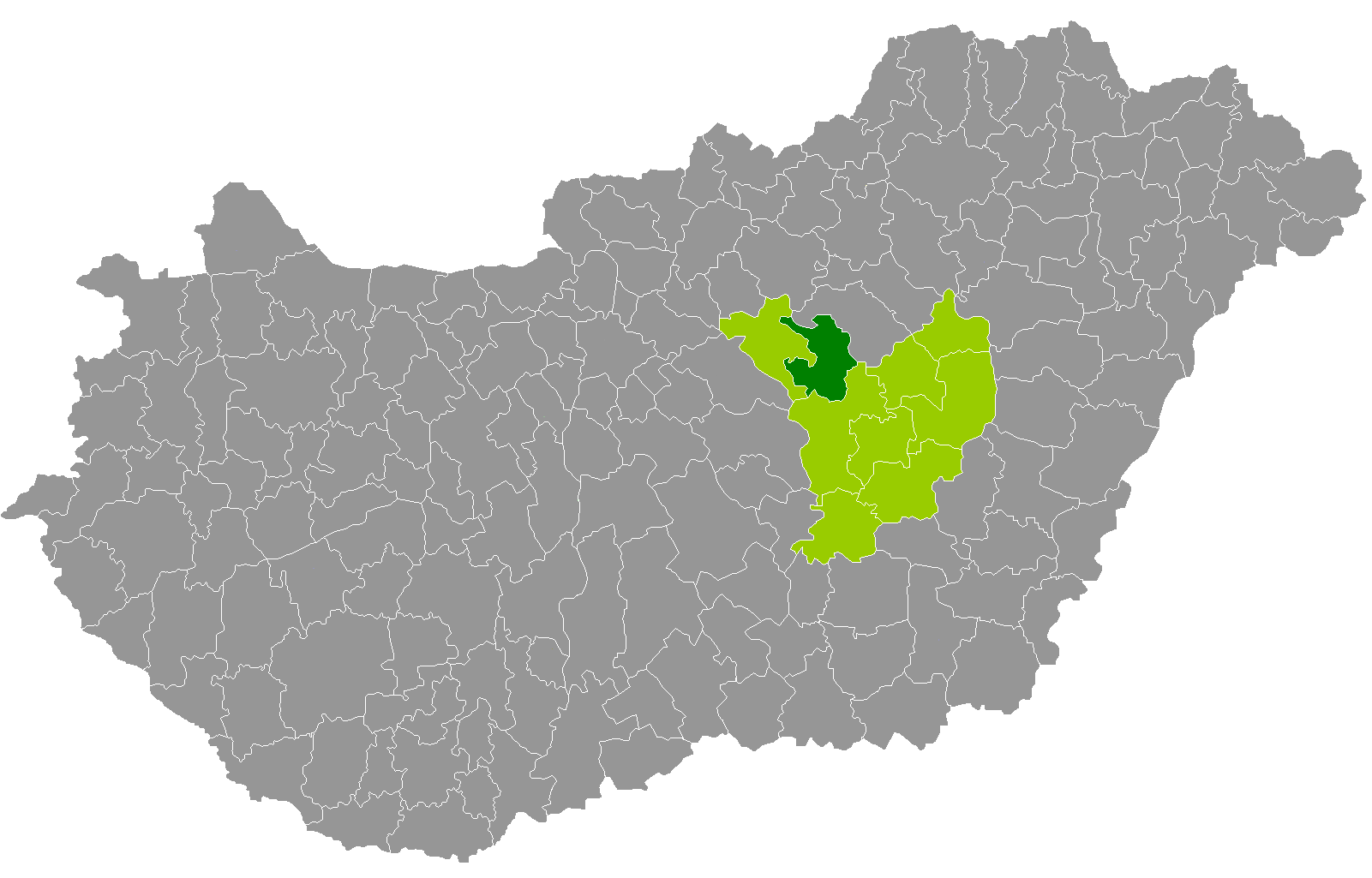
- Jászapáti District within Hungary and Jász-Nagykun-Szolnok County.
- Country: Hungary
- County: Jász-Nagykun-Szolnok
- District seat: Jászapáti

Area
  - Total: 544.45 km^{2} (210.21 sq mi)
  - Rank: 6th in Jász-Nagykun-Szolnok

Population (2011 census)
  - Total: 33,172
  - Rank: 6th in Jász-Nagykun-Szolnok
  - Density: 61/km^{2} (160/sq mi)

Jászapáti (Hungarian: Jászapáti járás) is a district in north-western part of Jász-Nagykun-Szolnok County. Jászapáti is also the name of the town where the district seat is found. The district is located in the Northern Great Plain Statistical Region. This district is a part of Jászság historical, ethnographical and geographical region.

== Geography ==
Jászapáti District borders with Heves District (Heves County) to the northeast, Szolnok District to the east and south, Jászberény District to the west. The number of the inhabited places in Jászapáti District is 9.

== History ==
The Jászapáti District existed before the cessation of the districts in 1983, known as the Lower Jászság District since the 1950s. It was headquartered in Jászapáti and was closed in 1961, when its territory was divided between mainly Jászberény and Szolnok Districts.

== Municipalities ==
The district has 2 towns, 1 large village and 6 villages. (ordered by population, as of 1 January 2012)

- Alattyán (2,101)
- Jánoshida (2,424)
- Jászalsószentgyörgy (3,432)
- **Jászapáti** (8,947) – district seat
- Jászdózsa (2,110)
- Jászivány (405)
- **Jászkisér** (5,165)
- Jászladány (5,717)
- Jászszentandrás (2,435)

The bolded municipalities are cities, italics municipality is large village.

== Demographics ==
Religion in Jászapáti District (2011 census)
1. Catholic Church (58.4%)
2. Greek Catholicism (0.20%)
3. Calvinism (5.30%)
4. Lutheranism (0.20%)
5. Other religions (1.40%)
6. Non-religious (11.5%)
7. Atheists (0.50%)
8. Undeclared (22.6%)

In 2011, it had a population of 33,172 and the population density was 61/km^{2}.

Year	County population	Change
2011	33,172	n/a

=== Ethnicity ===
Besides the Hungarian majority, the main minorities are the Roma (approx. 3,000) and German (100).

Total population (2011 census): 33,172
Ethnic groups (2011 census): Identified themselves: 32,580 persons:

- Hungarians: 29,293 (89.12%)
- Gypsies: 3,142 (9.64%)
- Others and indefinable: 145 (0.45%)

Approx. 500 persons in Jászapáti District did not declare their ethnic group at the 2011 census.

=== Religion ===
Religious adherence in the county according to 2011 census:

- Catholic – 19,433 (Roman Catholic – 19,370; Greek Catholic – 61);
- Reformed – 1,751;
- Evangelical – 56;
- other religions – 472;
- Non-religious – 3,807;
- Atheism – 153;
- Undeclared – 7,500.

== Transport ==
=== Road network ===
- Main road (W→E): Budapest... – **Jászapáti District** (1 municipality: Jászapáti) – ...Dormánd
- Main road (NW→SE): Hatvan... – **Jászapáti District** (2 municipalities: Alattyán, Jászalsószentgyörgy) – ...Szolnok

=== Railway network ===
- Line 86 (N→S): Vámosgyörk (80, 85)... – **Jászapáti District** (4 municipalities: Jászdózsa, Jászapáti, Jászkisér, Jászladány) – ...Újszász (82, 120)

== Gallery ==
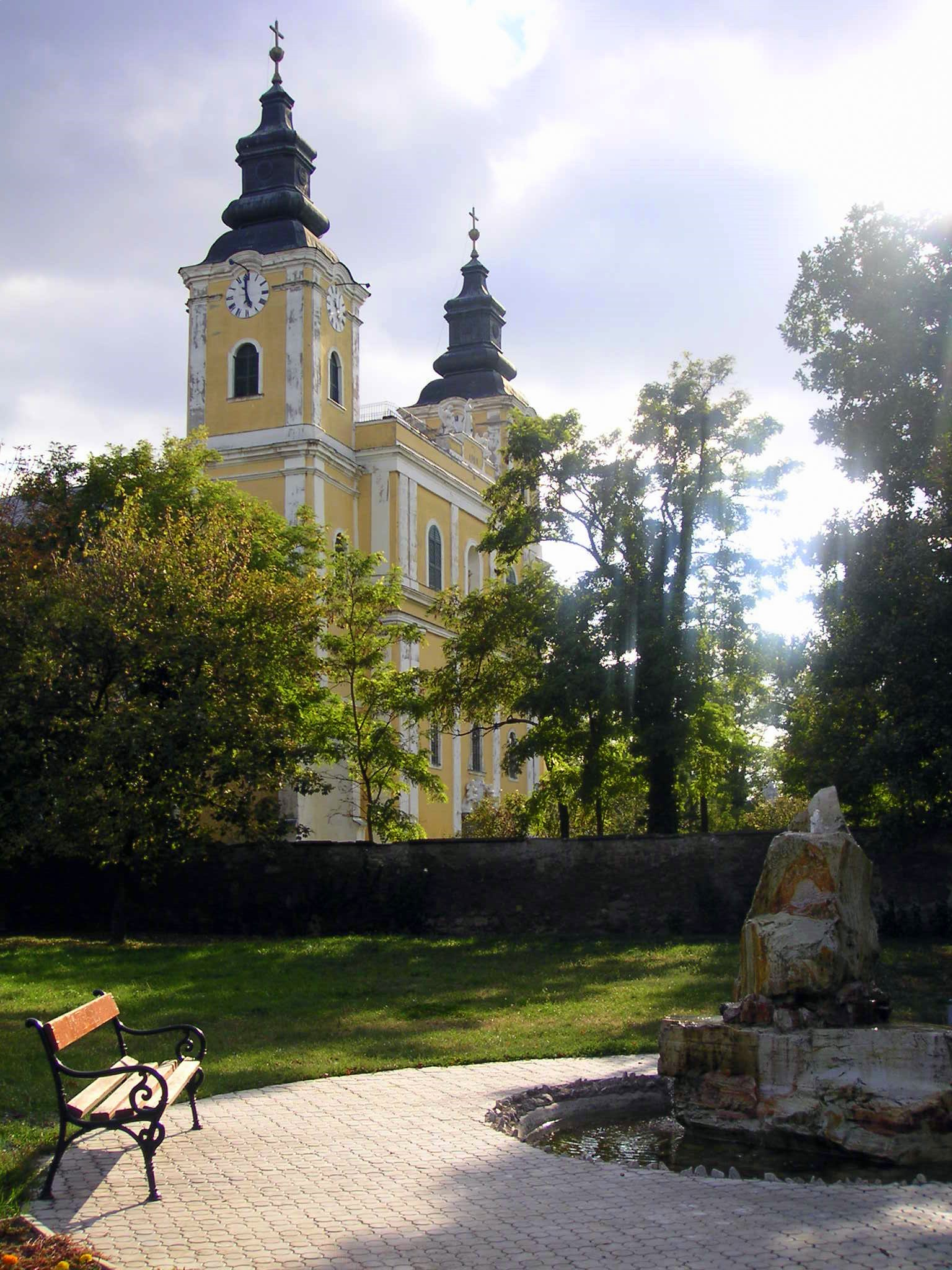
Jászapáti, the district seat

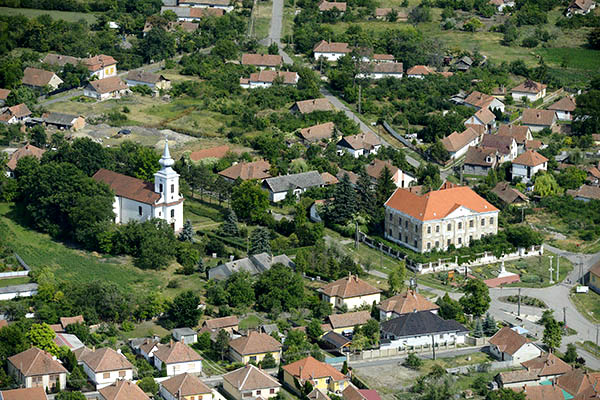
Aerial view of Jánoshida

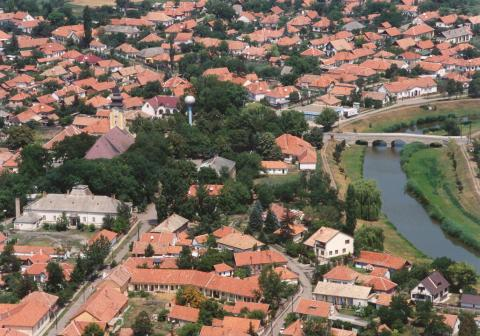
Aerial view of Jászdózsa

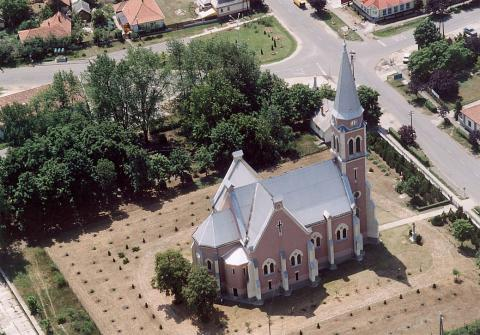
Church of the Exaltation of the Holy Cross in Jászszentandrás

== See also ==
- List of cities and towns of Hungary
