= Jász–Nagykun–Szolnok County =

County of Hungary

Coordinates: 47°15′N 20°30′E

Jász–Nagykun–Szolnok County Jász-Nagykun-Szolnok megye
- County
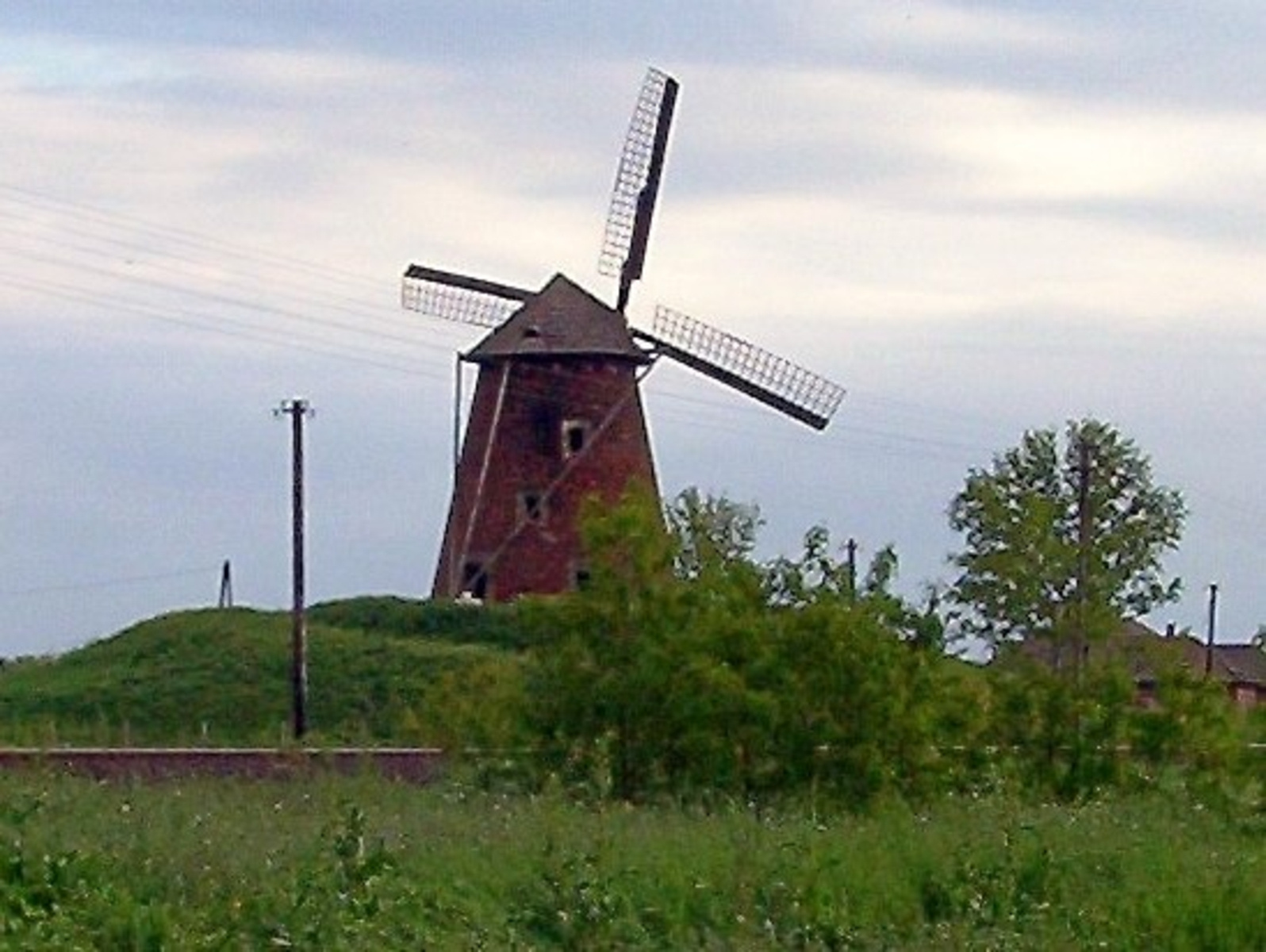
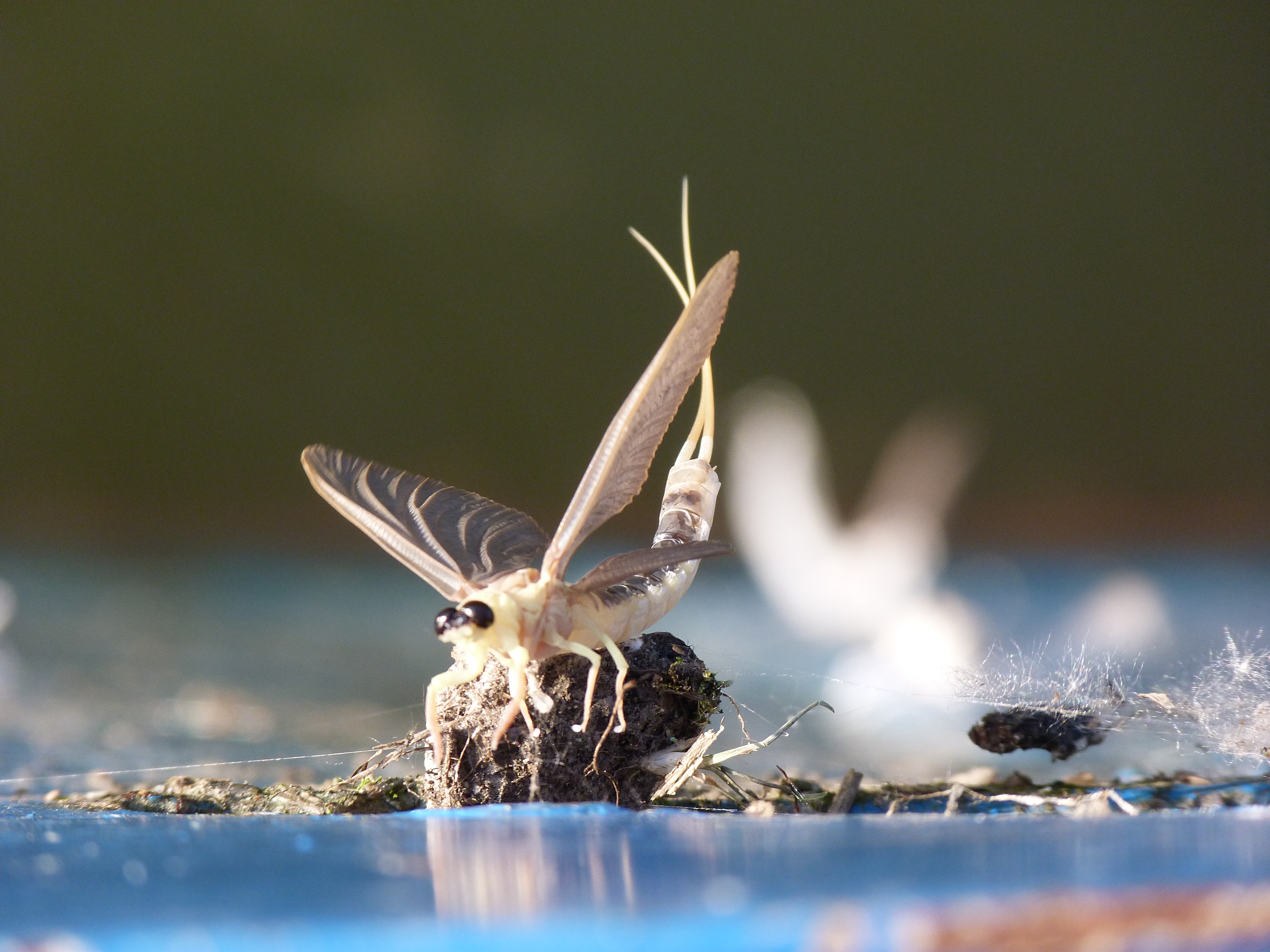
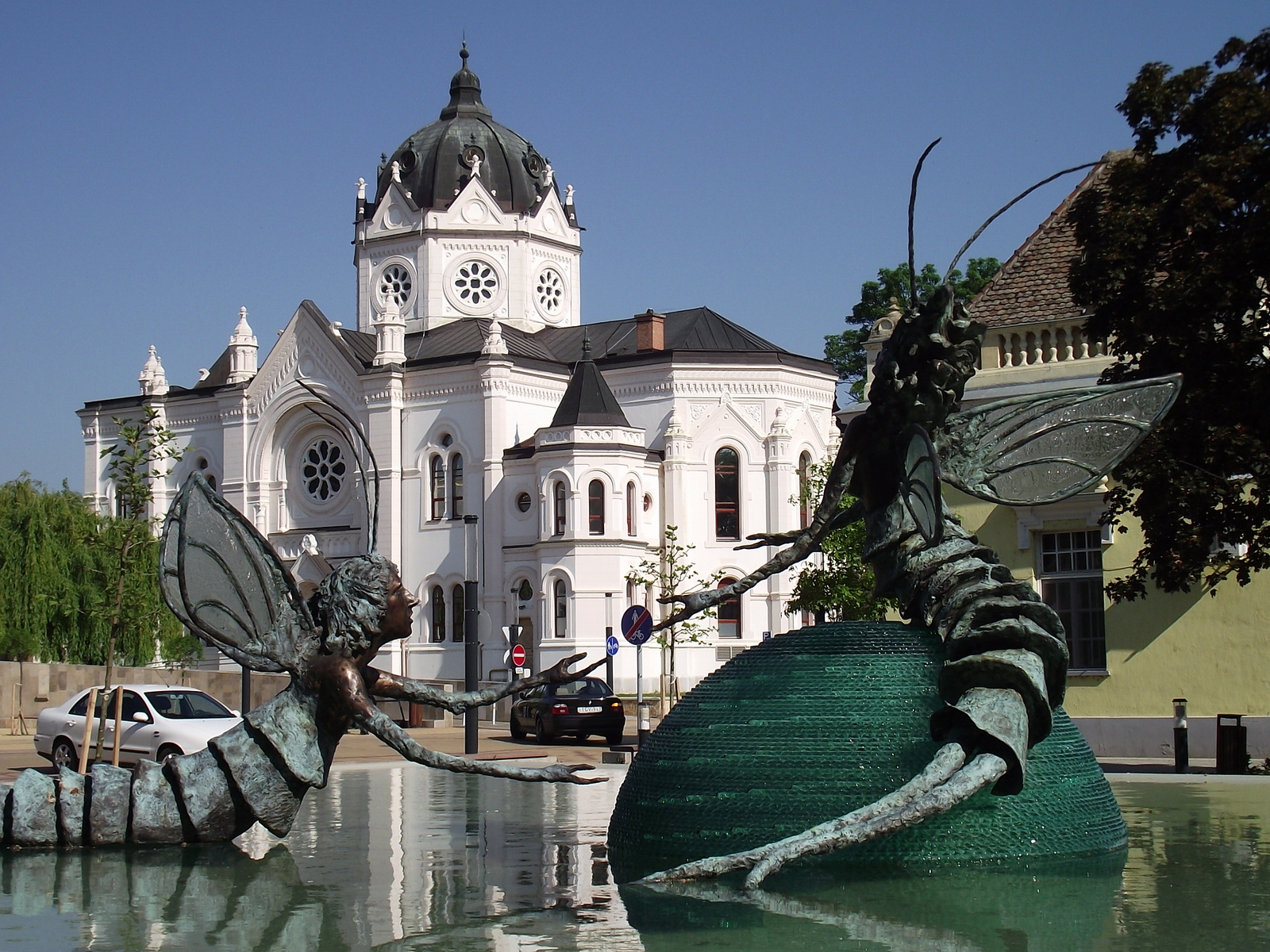
- Descending, from top: Windmill near Kengyel, A mayfly is hatching on Tisza, and Gallery of Szolnok

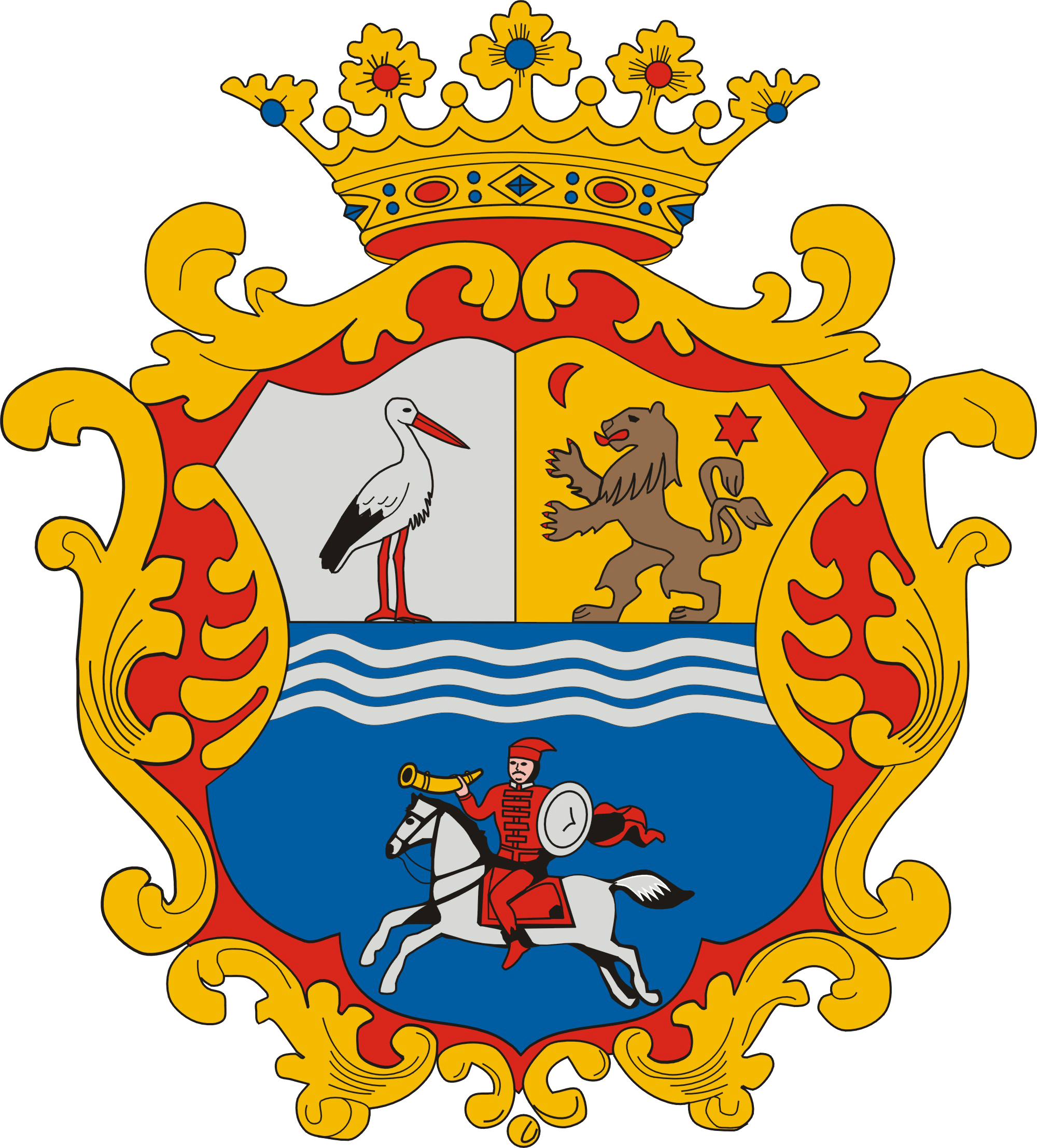
- Flag Coat of arms

- Jász–Nagykun–Szolnok County within Hungary
- Country: Hungary
- Region: Northern Great Plain
- County seat: Szolnok
- Districts: 9 districts: Jászapáti District; Jászberény District; Karcag District; Kunhegyes District; Kunszentmárton District; Mezőtúr District; Szolnok District; Tiszafüred District; Törökszentmiklós District

Government
  - President of the General Assembly: Dr. Sándor Kovács (Fidesz-KDNP)

Area
  - Total: 5,581.61 km^{2} (2,155.07 sq mi)
  - Rank: 8th in Hungary

Population (2018)
  - Total: 371,271
  - Rank: 9th in Hungary
  - Density: 66.5168/km^{2} (172.278/sq mi)

GDP
  - Total: HUF 883 billion €2.836 billion (2016)
- Postal code: 50xx – 54xx
- Area code(s): (+36) 56, 57, 59
- ISO 3166 code: HU-JN
- Website: jnszm.hu

Jász–Nagykun–Szolnok (Hungarian: Jász-Nagykun-Szolnok megye, pronounced [ˈjaːs ˈnɒckun ˈsolnok]) is an administrative county (comitatus or megye) in Hungary. It lies in central Hungary and shares borders with the Hungarian counties Pest, Heves, Borsod–Abaúj–Zemplén, Hajdú–Bihar, Békés, Csongrád, and Bács–Kiskun. The rivers Tisza and Körös flow through the county. The capital of Jász–Nagykun–Szolnok county is Szolnok. Its area is 5,582 km^{2} (2,155 sq mi). The county is named after the Ossetians (Jasz) and Cumans (Kun) who settled there, along with Szolnok. The county was part of the Danube–Criș–Mureș–Tisa Euroregion between 1997 and 2004.

== Geography ==
This county has a total area of 5,582 km^{2} (2,155 sq mi) – 6.00% of Hungary.

=== Neighbouring counties ===
- Heves and Borsod–Abaúj–Zemplén County in the North.
- Hajdú–Bihar and Békés County in the East.
- Csongrád-Csanád County in the South.
- Bács–Kiskun and Pest County in the West.

== Symbols ==
=== Coat of arms and flag ===
The county's coat of arms was recreated in 1991 from the coats of arms of the former Jászkun periphery, with the crown and frame decoration on it. It consists of the unification of the coat of arms of Jászság, Nagykunság and former Exterior-Szolnok County. The upper part is divided into two equally spaced vertices from top to bottom.

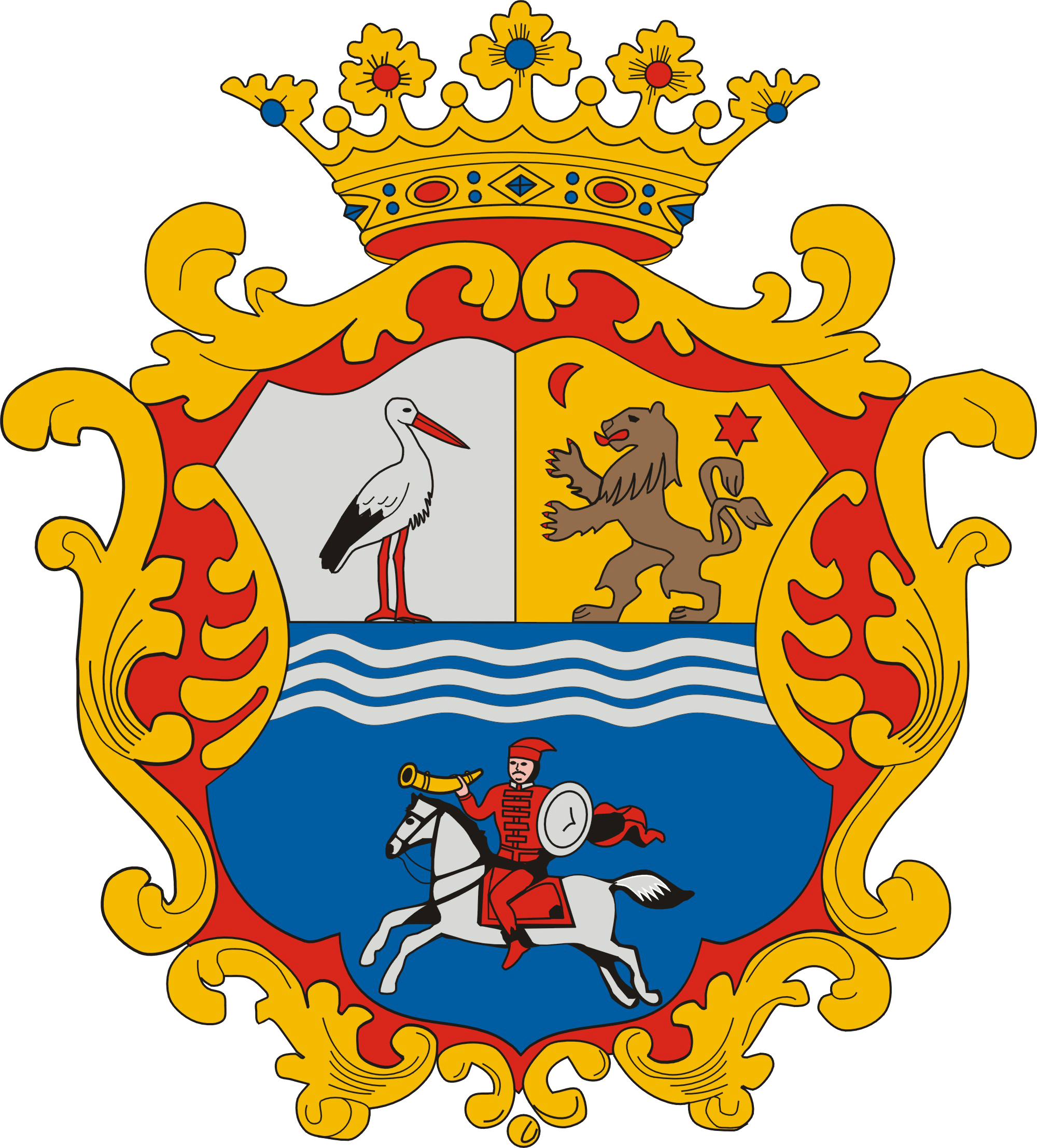

- The upper-left field is a natural colored stork, on a silver (white) background. It means the formerly Exterior–Szolnok County.
- The top-right coat of arms shows a dark brown lion, with red crescent and star above it, on a gold (yellow) background. It means the Nagykunság.
- Bottom, with the coat of arms is divided into two parts and it is divided into a lower part in a blue box on a white-knight fighter, his right hand with the Lehel's horn, his left hand holding a shield. It symbolizes the Jászság.
- Above the rider, three wavy silver bars represent the three rivers (Tisza, Zagyva and Körös) of Jász-Nagykun-Szolnok County.

The flag is vertically divided into two equal sections (blue and white), with the coat of arms on it, and the county's name embroidered with gold thread under the coat of arms. Its ratio is 2:1. The use of both coat of arms and flag is regulated by the county council.

== Demographics ==
In 2015, it had a population of 379,897 and the population density was 68/km^{2}.

Historical population

Year	Pop.	±%
1870	276,760	—
1880	298,655	+7.9%
1890	341,335	+14.3%
1900	375,134	+9.9%
1910	399,153	+6.4%
1920	413,593	+3.6%

Year	Pop.	±%
1930	440,808	+6.6%
1941	453,038	+2.8%
1949	449,551	−0.8%
1960	461,307	+2.6%
1970	437,879	−5.1%
1980	445,624	+1.8%

Year	Pop.	±%
1990	425,583	−4.5%
2001	415,917	−2.3%
2011	386,594	−7.1%
2022	355,809	−8.0%

Source: Censuses

=== Ethnicity ===
Religion in Jász-Nagykun-Szolnok County (2022 census – of those who declared their religion (59.4%)
1. Roman Catholic (37.1%)
2. Greek Catholic (0.70%)
3. Calvinistic (14.8%)
4. Other Christian denomination (3.90%)
5. Other religion (0.40%)
6. Not religious (43.1%)

Besides the Hungarian majority, the main minorities are the Roma (approx. 19,000), German and Romanian (500).

Total population (2011 census): 386,594
Ethnic groups (2011 census): Identified themselves: 344,488 persons:

- Hungarians: 323,293 (93.85%)
- Roma: 18,935 (5.50%)
- Others and indefinable: 2,260 (0.66%)

Approx. 56,000 persons in Jász-Nagykun-Szolnok County did not declare their ethnic group at the 2011 census.

=== Religion ===
Religious adherence in the county according to 2011 census:

- Catholic – 124,331 (Roman Catholic – 123,208; Greek Catholic – 1,106);
- Reformed – 42,968;
- Evangelical – 1,127;
- other religions – 4,312;
- Non-religious – 108,247;
- Atheism – 4,651;
- Undeclared – 100,958.

== Regional structure ==
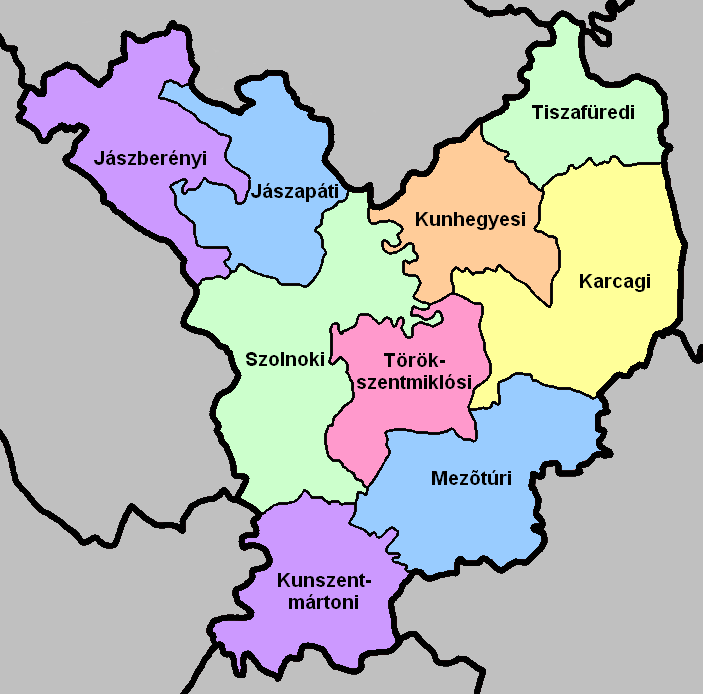
District of Jász–Nagykun–Szolnok County

No.	English and Hungarian names	Area (km^{2})	Population (2011)	Density (pop./km^{2})	Seat	No. of municipalities
1	Jászapáti District; Jászapáti járás	544.45	33,172	61	Jászapáti	9
2	Jászberény District; Jászberényi járás	617.01	51,274	83	Jászberény	9
3	Karcag District; Karcagi járás	857.26	43,226	50	Karcag	5
4	Kunhegyes District; Kunhegyesi járás	464.58	20,045	43	Kunhegyes	7
5	Kunszentmárton District; Kunszentmártoni járás	576.49	36,147	63	Kunszentmárton	11
6	Mezőtúr District; Mezőtúri járás	725.74	28,191	39	Mezőtúr	5
7	Szolnok District; Szolnoki járás	914.48	118,241	129	Szolnok	18
8	Tiszafüred District; Tiszafüredi járás	417.05	19,559	47	Tiszafüred	7
9	Törökszentmiklós District; Törökszentmiklósi járás	464.54	36,739	79	Törökszentmiklós	7
Jász-Nagykun-Szolnok County		5,581.61	386,594	69	Szolnok	78

== Transport ==
=== Road network ===
As of 2012, Jász–Nagykun–Szolnok County has a dense network of public roads, totalling 1,330 km (830 mi) in length of which 112 km (70 mi) are primary and 283 km (176 mi) are secondary. There are 935 km (581 mi) of county and communal roads and 14 km (8.7 mi) are covered with light road surfaces.

Highway network

- from Budapest to Nagykereki (Romanian border). (planned)
- from Szolnok to Szentgotthárd (Austrian border). (planned)
- from Kecskemét to Gyula (Romanian border). (under construction)

Road network

- runs from Budapest to Záhony (Ukrainian border), via Szolnok, Törökszentmiklós and Karcag. – 81 km (50 mi)
- runs from Budapest to Füzesabony, via Jászberény and Jászapáti.
- runs from Szolnok to Hatvan, via Újszász, Jászberény and Jászfényszaru. ~ 74 km (46 mi)
- runs from Füzesabony to Debrecen, via Tiszafüred.
- runs from Tiszafüred to Fegyvernek, via Kunhegyes. ~ 53 km (33 mi)
- old sections of Main road 4.
- runs from Kecskemét to Gyula (Romanian border), via Kunszentmárton and Öcsöd. – 29 km (18 mi)
- runs from Kunszentmárton to Hódmezővásárhely. – 10 km (6.2 mi)
- runs from Törökszentmiklós to Mezőberény, via Mezőtúr. – 33 km (21 mi)
- 402 runs from Szolnok-center to Main road 4.
- runs from Szolnok to Kunszentmárton, via Martfű. – 43 km (27 mi)

=== Rail network ===
Rail lines in the county cover 503 km (313 mi) of route. 35% are double track, and over 45% (243 km, 151 mi) are electrified.

== Politics ==
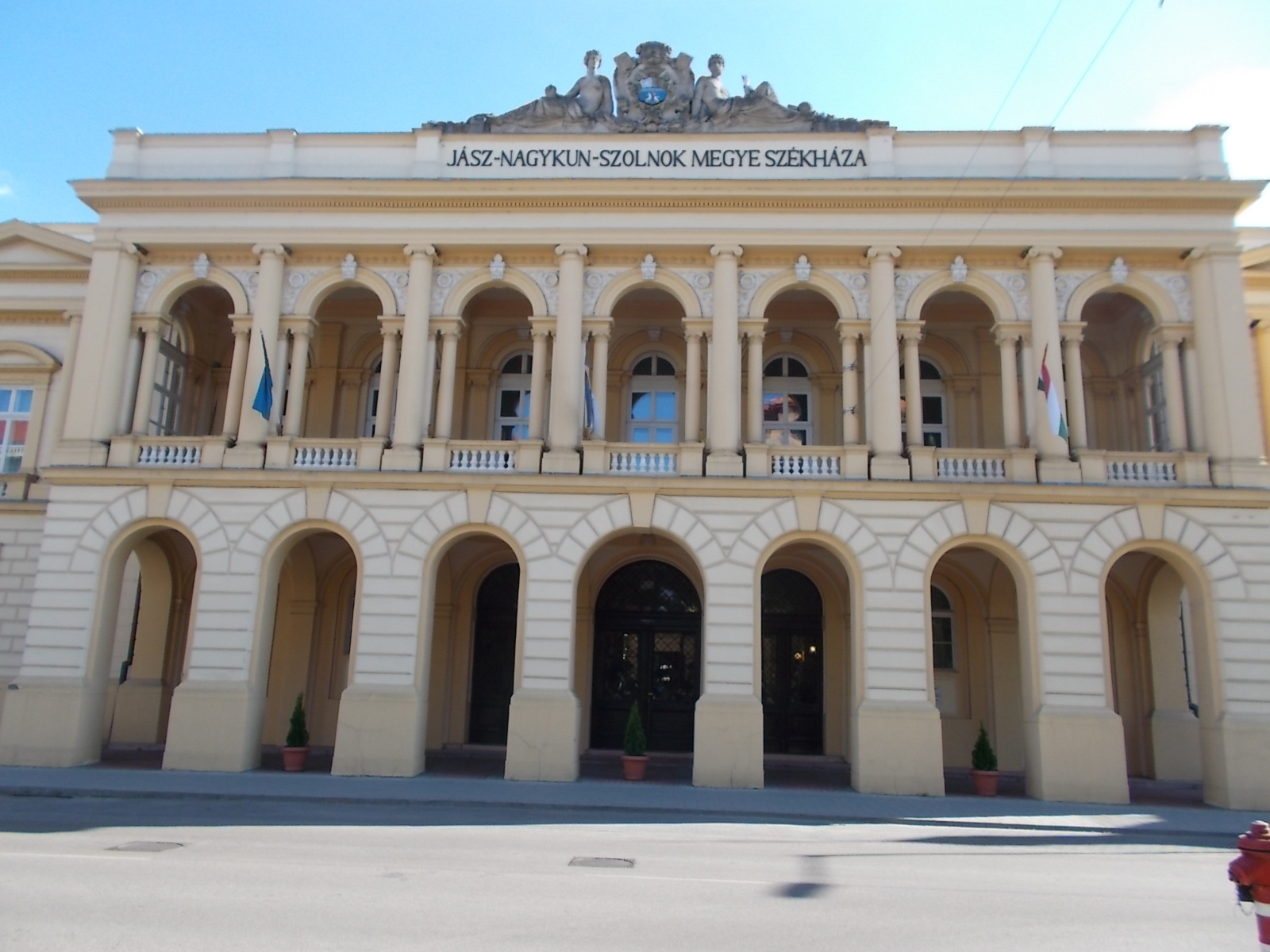
County hall of Jász–Nagykun–Szolnok

=== County Assembly ===
The county is governed by the County board of supervisors, which is located in the county seat. The Jász-Nagykun-Szolnok County Council, elected at the 2024 local government elections, is made up of 18 counselors, with the following party composition:

Party	Seats	Current County Assembly
Fidesz–KDNP	11	
Our Homeland Movement	3	
Democratic Coalition	2	
Momentum Movement	1	
Jobbik	1	

==== Presidents of the County Assembly ====
List of presidents since 1990
Lajos Boros (MDF)	1990–1994
Imre Iváncsik (MSZP)	1994–1998
Lajos Búsi (Fidesz)	1998–2002
István Tokár (MSZP)	2002–2006
Andor Fejér (Fidesz–KDNP)	2006–2010
Sándor Kovács (Fidesz-KDNP)	2010–2019
Imre Hubai (Fidesz–KDNP)	2019–

=== Members of the National Assembly ===
The following members elected of the National Assembly during the 2022 parliamentary election:

Constituency	Member	Party
Jász-Nagykun-Szolnok County 1st constituency	Mária Kállai	Fidesz–KDNP
Jász-Nagykun-Szolnok County 2nd constituency	János Pócs	Fidesz–KDNP
Jász-Nagykun-Szolnok County 3rd constituency	Sándor F. Kovács	Fidesz–KDNP
Jász-Nagykun-Szolnok County 4th constituency	Zsolt Herczeg	Fidesz–KDNP

== Municipalities ==
Jász–Nagykun–Szolnok County has 1 urban county, 21 towns, 4 large villages and 52 villages.

City with county rights

(ordered by population, as of 2011 census)

- Szolnok (72,953) – county seat

Towns

- Jászberény (27,087)
- Törökszentmiklós (21,071)
- Karcag (20,632)
- Mezőtúr (17,510)
- Kisújszállás (11,397)
- Tiszafüred (11,382)
- Tiszaföldvár (11,129)
- Jászapáti (8,889)
- Túrkeve (8,878)
- Kunszentmárton (8,714)
- Jászárokszállás (7,929)
- Kunhegyes (7,704)
- Martfű (6,535)
- Fegyvernek (6,507)
- Újszász (6,321)
- Jászfényszaru (5,680)
- Jászkisér (5,467)
- Rákóczifalva (5,434)
- Kenderes (4,809)
- Abádszalók (4,180)
- Besenyszög (3,339)

Large villages

- Cibakháza
- Jászladány
- Kunmadaras
- Öcsöd

Villages

- Alattyán
- Berekfürdő
- Csataszög
- Csépa
- Cserkeszőlő
- Fegyvernek
- Hunyadfalva
- Jánoshida
- Jászágó
- Jászalsószentgyörgy
- Jászboldogháza
- Jászdózsa
- Jászfelsőszentgyörgy
- Jászivány
- Jászjákóhalma
- Jászszentandrás
- Jásztelek
- Kengyel
- Kétpó
- Kőtelek
- Kuncsorba
- Mesterszállás
- Mezőhék
- Nagyiván
- Nagykörű
- Nagyrév
- Örményes
- Pusztamonostor
- Rákócziújfalu
- Szajol
- Szászberek
- Szelevény
- Tiszabő
- Tiszabura
- Tiszaderzs
- Tiszagyenda
- Tiszaigar
- Tiszainoka
- Tiszajenő
- Tiszakürt
- Tiszaörs
- Tiszapüspöki
- Tiszaroff
- Tiszasas
- Tiszasüly
- Tiszaszentimre
- Tiszaszőlős
- Tiszatenyő
- Tiszavárkony
- Tomajmonostora
- Tószeg
- Vezseny
- Zagyvarékas

== Gallery ==
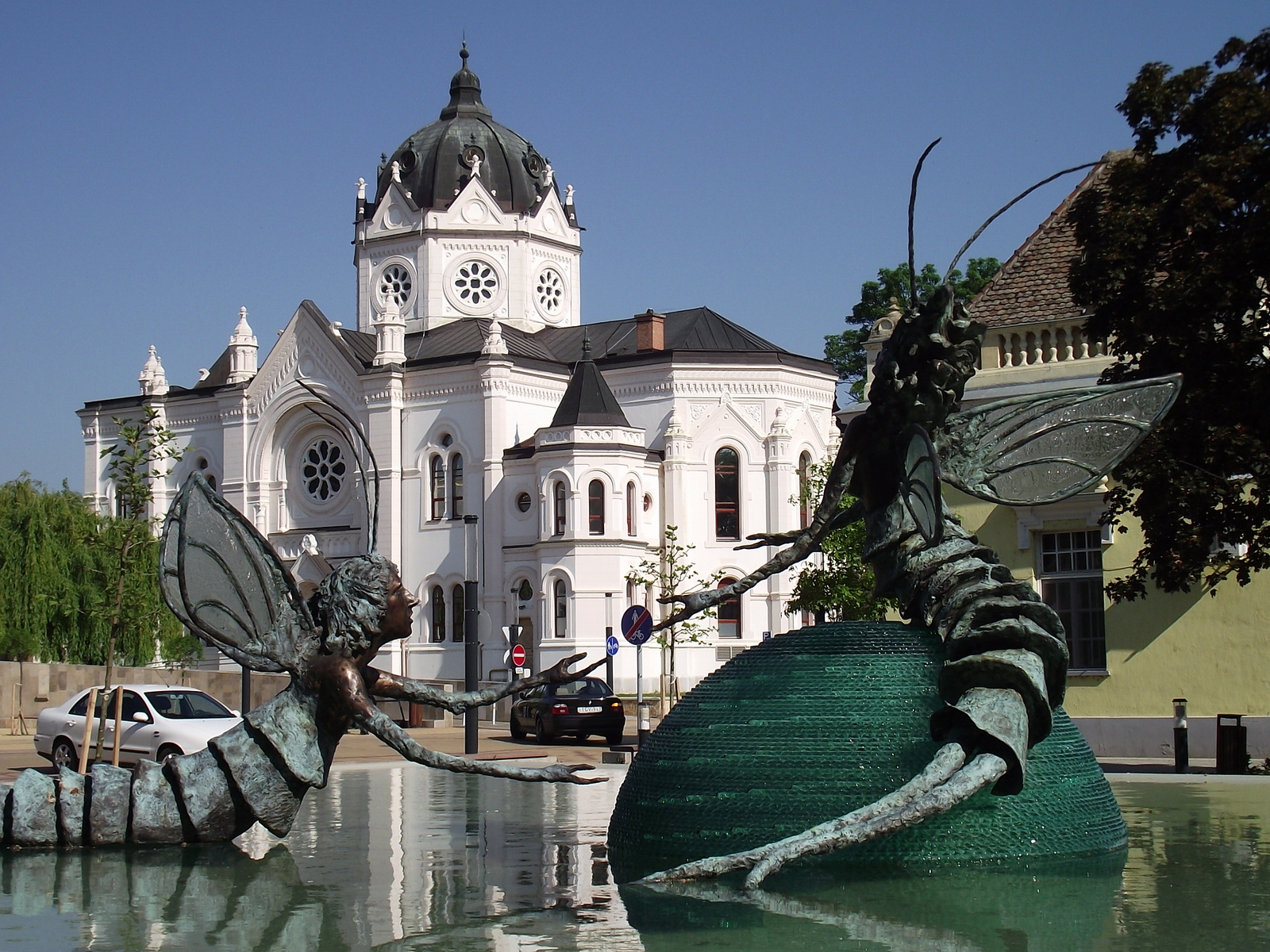
Szolnok Gallery (former synagogue) in Szolnok

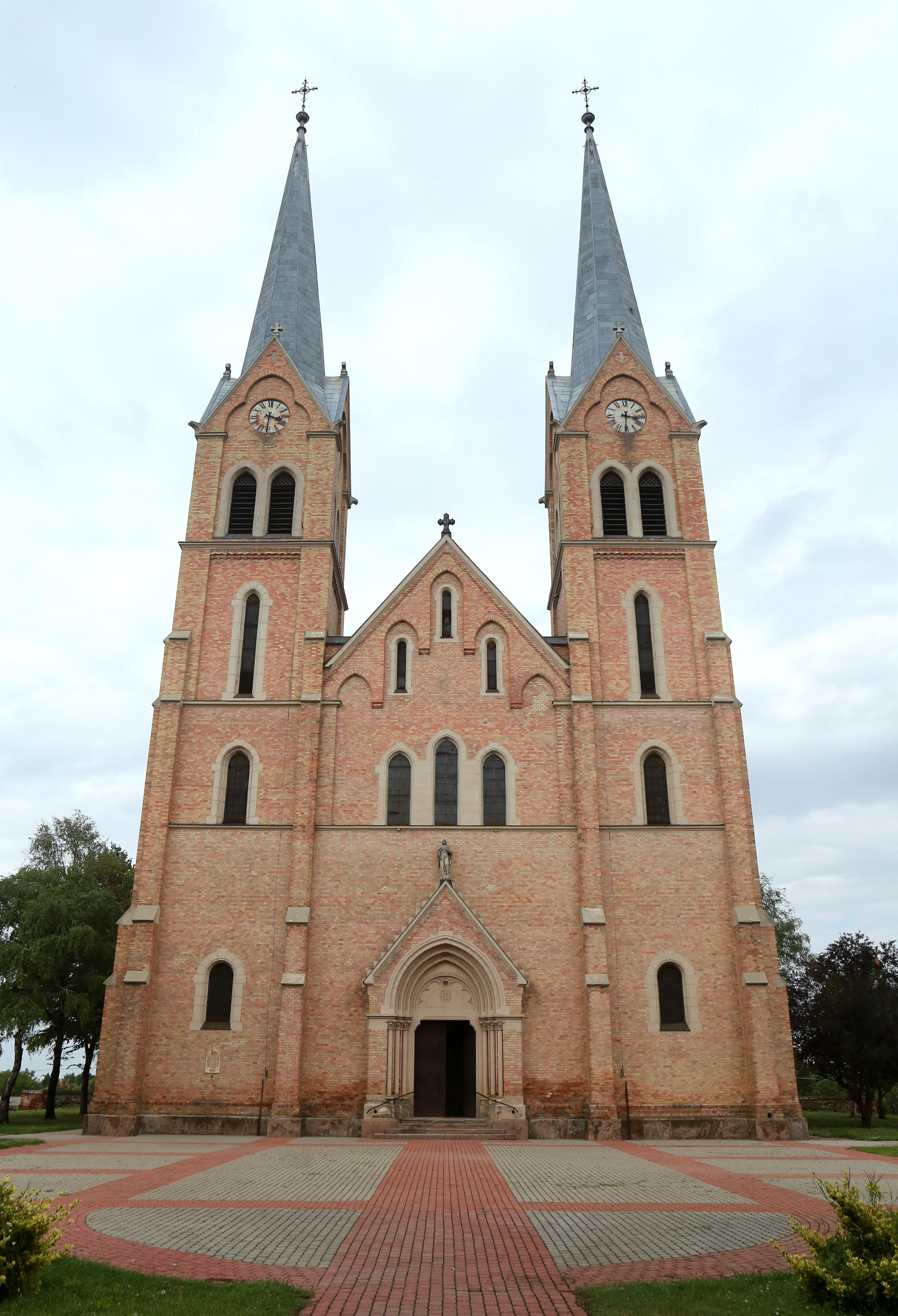
Holy Trinity Church in Törökszentmiklós

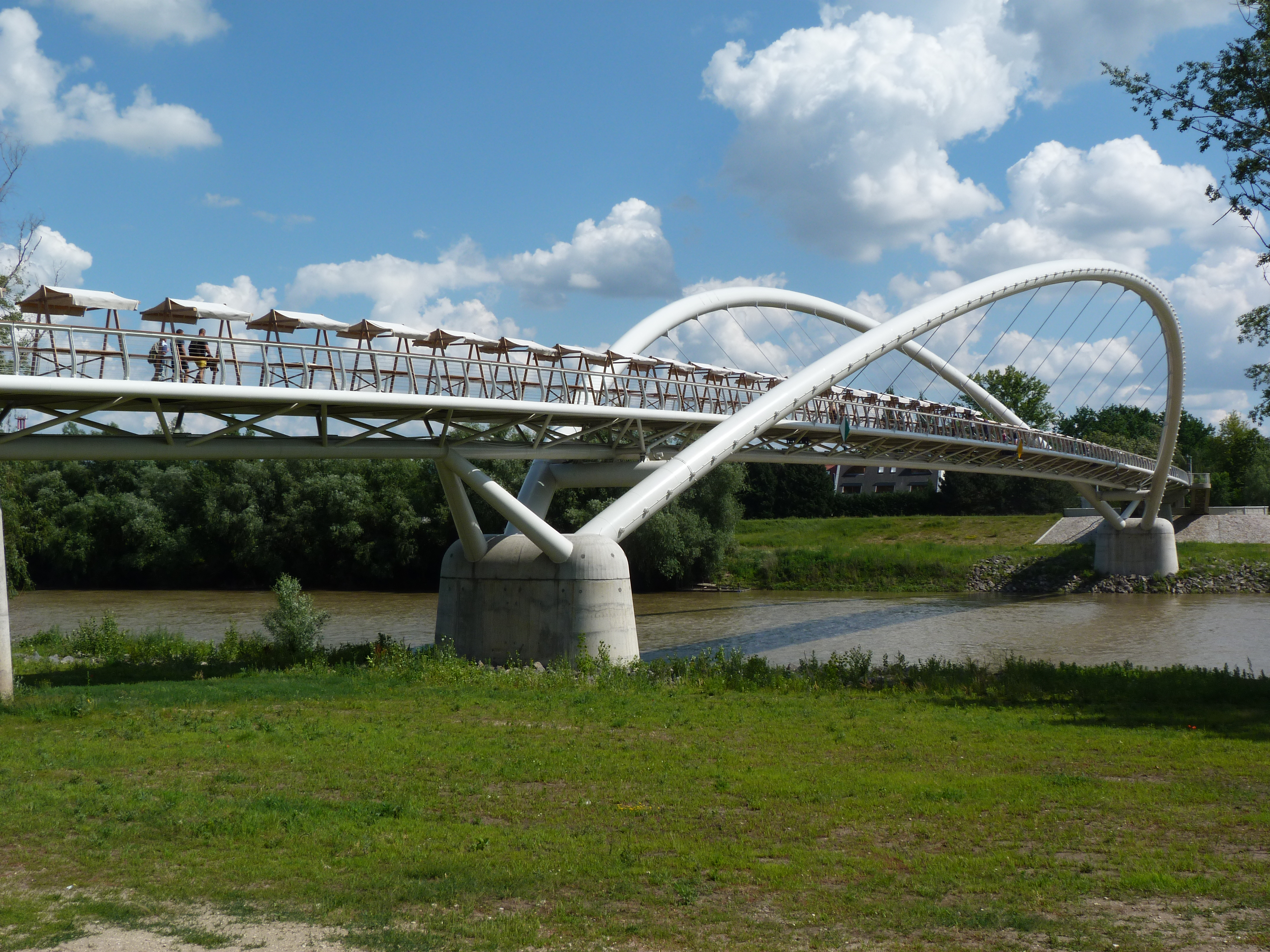
Tiszavirág bridge in Szolnok

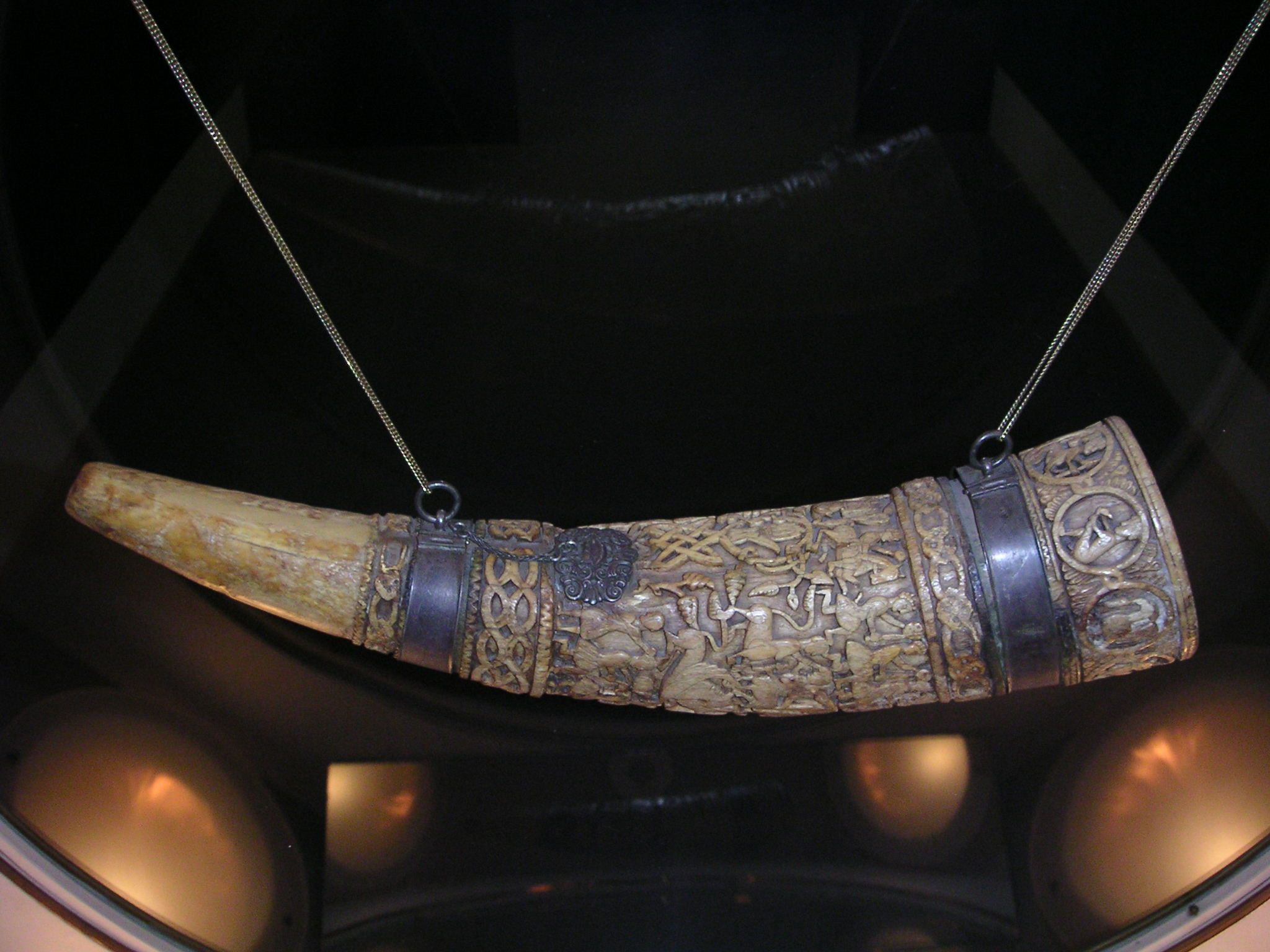
Horn of Lehel in Jászberény

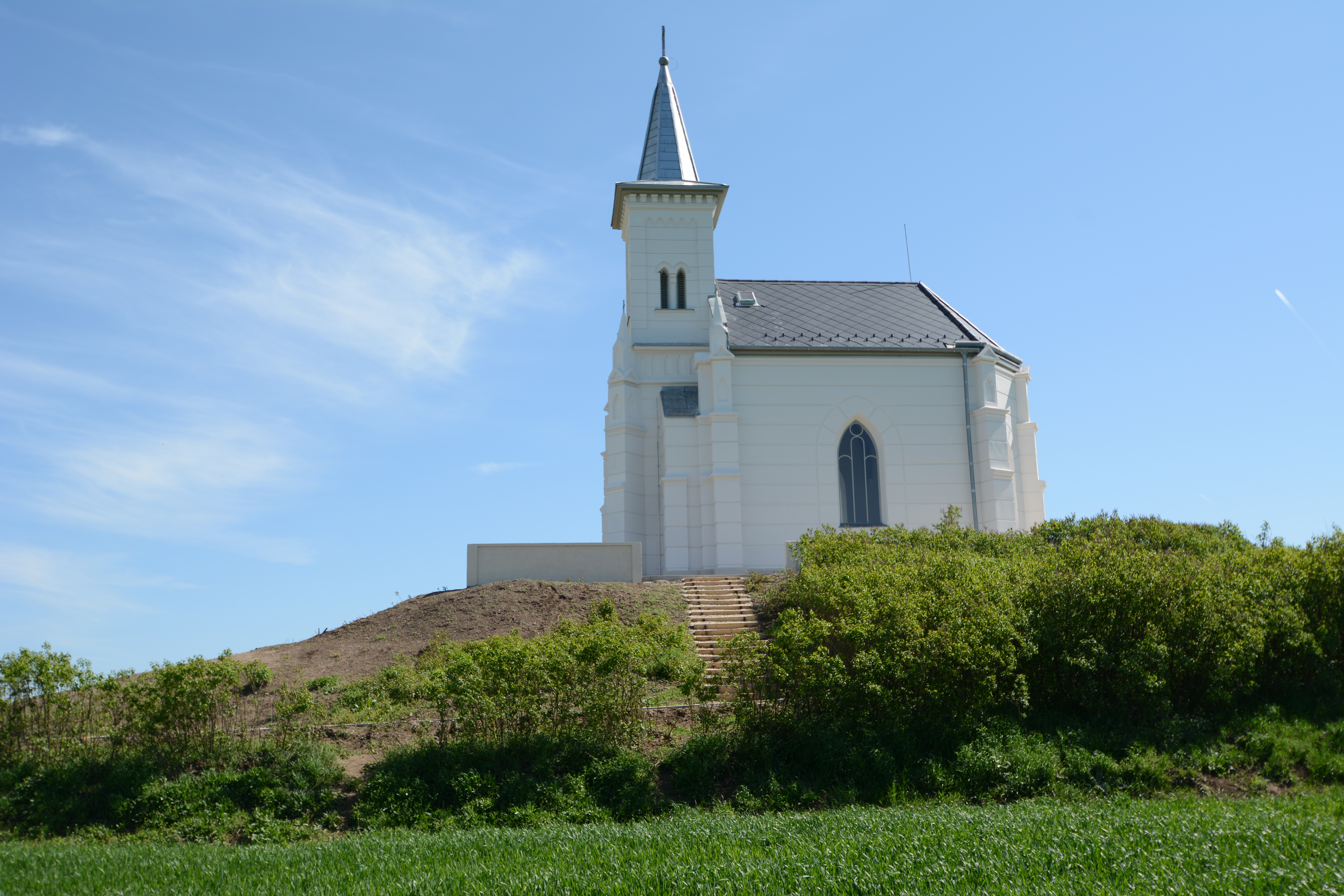
Chapel in Kunhegyes

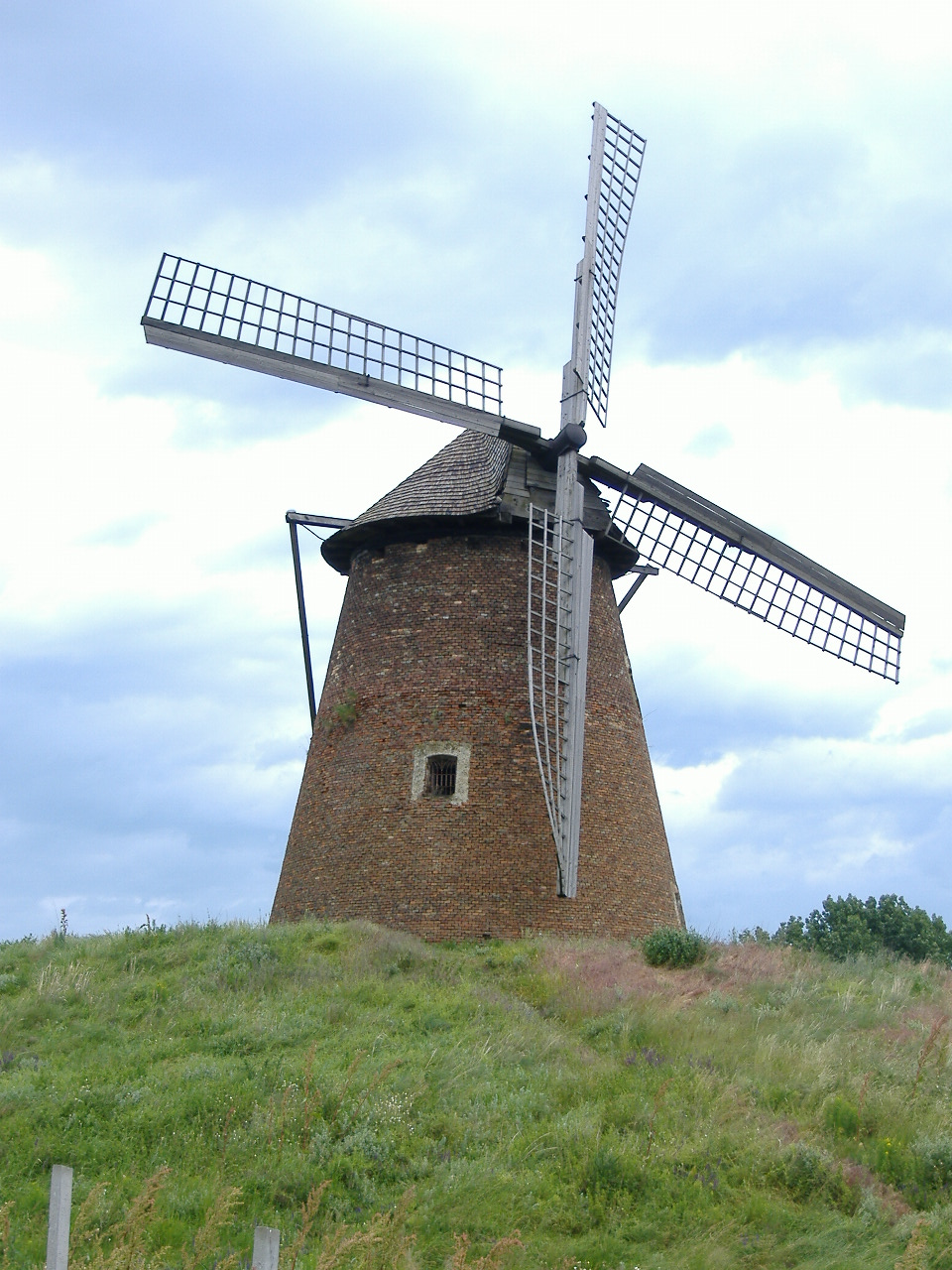
Windmill Hill in Kengyel

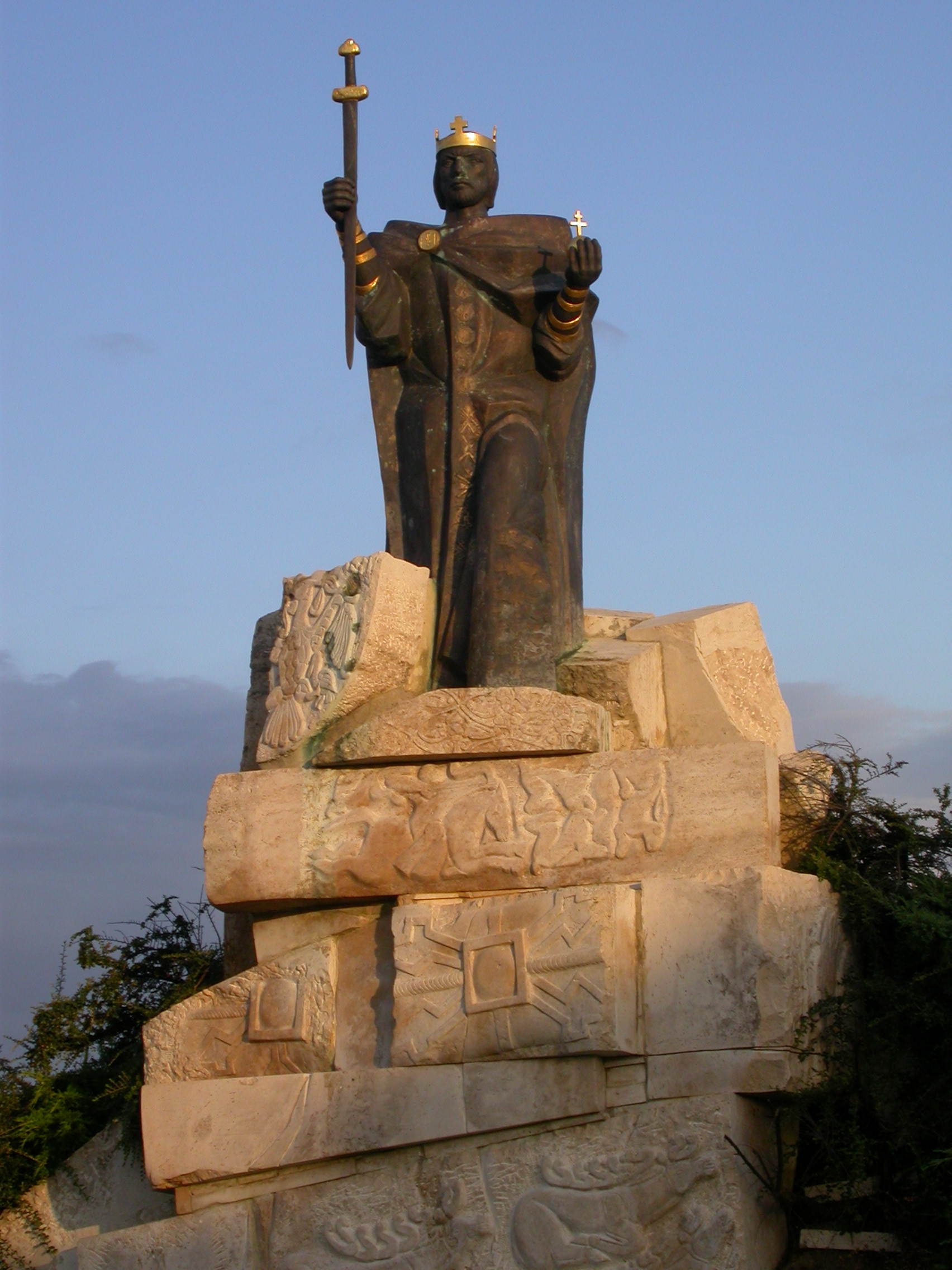
Statue of Stephen I of Hungary in Martfű

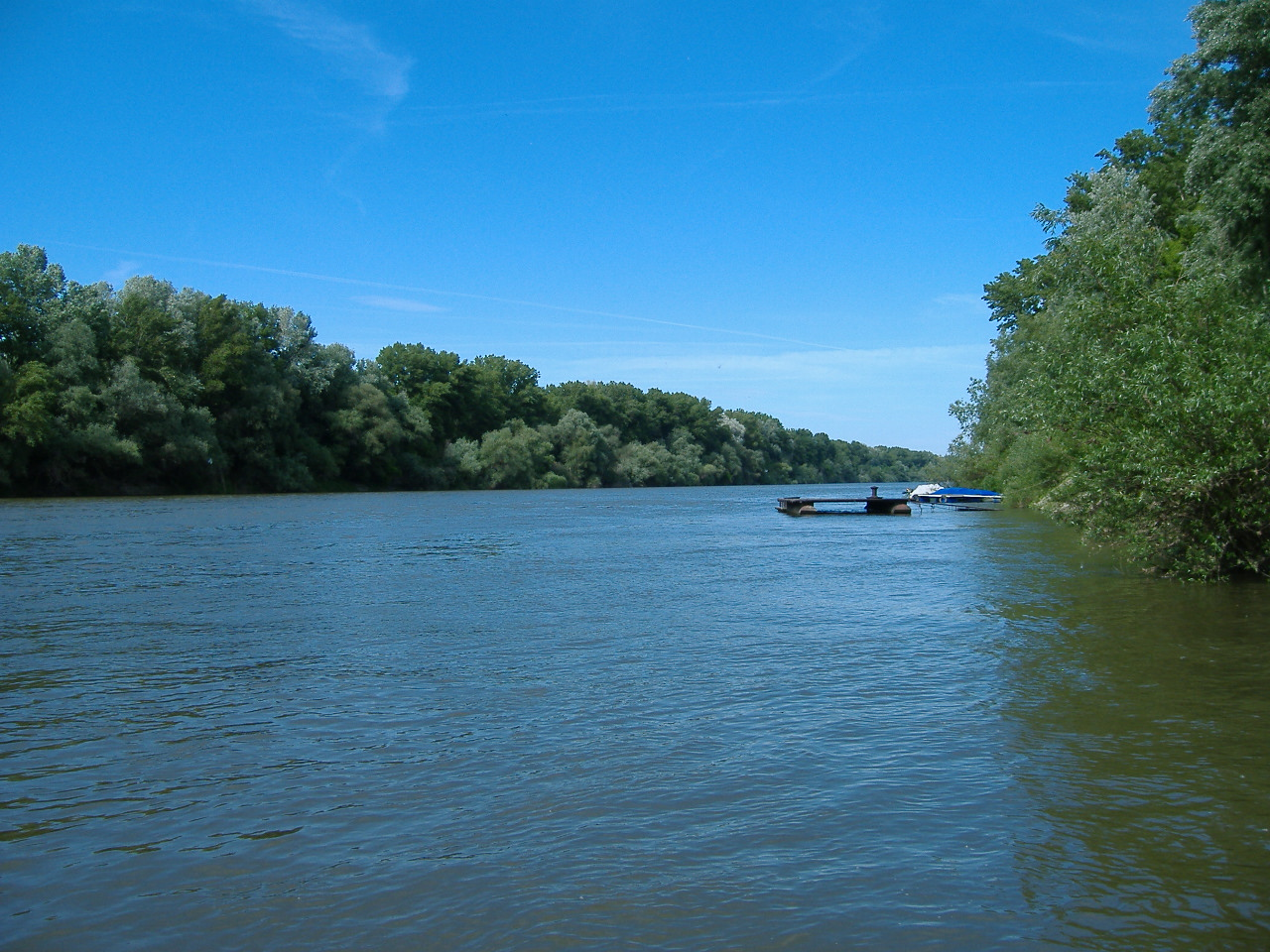
River Tisza near Tiszapüspöki

== Notable people ==
Many famous people have been born or lived in present-day Jász–Nagykun–Szolnok County:

- Statesman: Miklós Horthy
- Politicians: János Tóth, István Antal, Sándor Fazekas, Mihály Varga
- Writers, poets and playwrights: Ferenc Verseghy, István Csukás
- Musicians Classical: Déryné Róza Széppataki, Zoltán Jeney, Zoltán Mága. Other: Pál Kalmár, Ferenc Molnár "Caramel"
- Scientists: Gábor Szegő, Kalman Laki, Albert Kónya, József Hámori, Avram Hershko
- Sportspeople: Aladár Gerevich, Bertalan Papp, Gábor Benedek, Tibor Csík, Pál B. Nagy, Géza Csapó
- Actors, entertainers and film directors: Alexander Korda, Zoltan Korda, Vincent Korda, János Görbe, Gyula Szabó, Eszter Tamási
- Militarian: Lajos Czinege
- Businessman: Sándor Csányi
- Others: Gyula Németh, István Sándor

== International relations ==
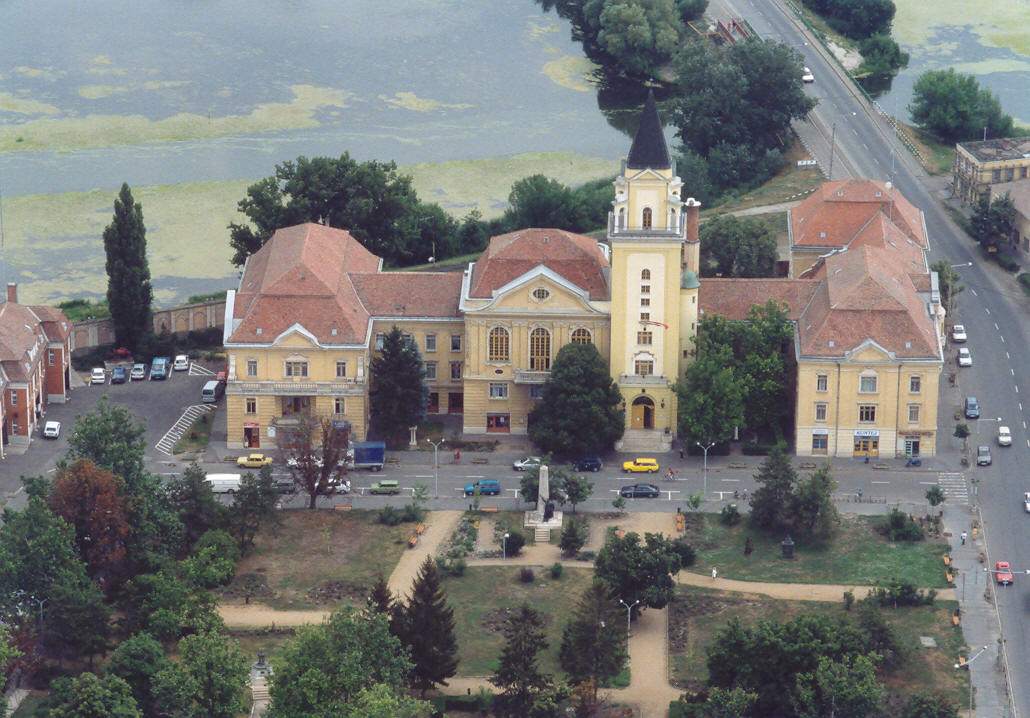
Mezőtúr – City hall – aerial photo

Jász-Nagykun-Szolnok County has a partnership relationship with:

- Province of Asti, Piedmont, Italy
- Almaty Region, Kazakhstan
- Bielsko County, Silesia, Poland
- Brzesko County, Lesser Poland, Poland
- Brandenburg, Germany
- Covasna County, Romania
- Dordogne, Nouvelle-Aquitaine, France
- County Durham, North East, England
- Henan Province, China
- Harghita County, Romania
- Lääne-Viru County, Estonia
- Maramureș County, Romania
- Mielec County, Podkarpackie, Poland
- Mureș County, Romania
- Pas-de-Calais, Hauts-de-France, France
- Shanxi Province, China
- Somme, Hauts-de-France, France
- Sucha County, Lesser Poland, Poland
- Tarnów County, Lesser Poland, Poland
- Kanta-Häme, Finland
- Teltow-Fläming, Brandenburg, Germany
- Vojvodina, Serbia
- Żywiec County, Silesia, Poland

== See also ==
- Cumans – the ancient nomadic warriors after whom the county is named
