= Kengyel =

- Village
- Coat of arms

- Location within Hungary
- Coordinates: 47°05′N 20°20′E
- Country: Hungary
- County: Jász-Nagykun-Szolnok
- District: Törökszentmiklós

Area
  - Total: 79.14 km^{2} (30.56 sq mi)

Population (2015)
  - Total: 3,552
  - Density: 44.9/km^{2} (116/sq mi)
- Time zone: UTC+1 (CET)
  - Summer (DST): UTC+2 (CEST)
- Postal code: 5083
- Area code(s): (+36) 56

Kengyel is a village in Jász-Nagykun-Szolnok county, in the Northern Great Plain region of central Hungary.

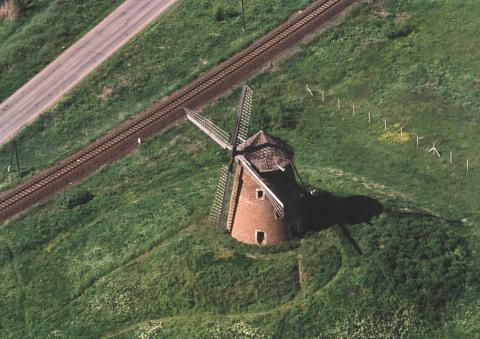
Kengyel, windmill from above

== Geography ==
It covers an area of 79.14 km^{2} (31 sq mi) and has a population of 3552 people (2015).
