= Alattyán =

- Village
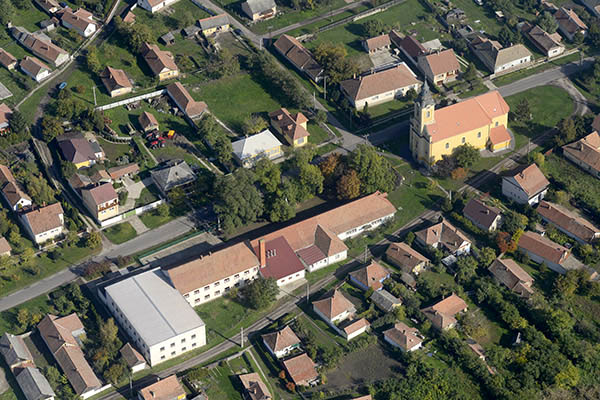

- Coat of arms

- Location within Hungary
- Coordinates: 47°25′35″N 20°02′27″E
- Country: Hungary
- County: Jász-Nagykun-Szolnok
- District: Jászapáti

Area
  - Total: 34.29 km^{2} (13.24 sq mi)

Population (2015)
  - Total: 1,989
  - Density: 56.87/km^{2} (147.3/sq mi)
- Time zone: UTC+1 (CET)
  - Summer (DST): UTC+2 (CEST)
- Postal code: 5142
- Area code(s): (+36) 57

Alattyán is a village in Jász-Nagykun-Szolnok county, in the Northern Great Plain region of central Hungary.

== Etymology ==
The name likely comes from Oghur Turkic Alıp-tığan, which means "heroic falcon".

== History ==
An Avar-era cemetery was excavated on its territory.

Its first written mention dates back to 1212 AD in the Váradi regestrum, in which it appears as Olaptiuã.

At the end of the 14th century, it was owned by the Kun family, later by the Chyrke family.

In the 15th century, there was a Kun settlement in the Kolbászszék vineyard.

The Ottoman Turks ransacked the settlement in 1536. It survived the Turkish invasion, but the wars of liberation also caused great destruction in Alattyán.

Around 1700, a part-owner, the provost of Premontre in Jánoshida, settled Moravian settlers in the area.

The village was added to the county of Jász-Nagykun-Szolnok and to Jászság in the geographical-historical sense by Article 33 of 1876.

Its population was 1,610 in 1851, 2,067 in 1891, 2,423 in 1910, 1,929 in 1990, and 2,060 in 2001.

== Famous people from Alattyán ==
On 15 May 2007, The New York Times published an article about looking for the ancestral estate of French president Nicolas Sarkozy's family in Alattyán.

Nowadays, for the elder inhabitants of Alattyán, Nicolas Sarkozy, nagybócsai Sárközy Miklós in Hungarian, is still considered their lord.
