= Jászberény =

- Town
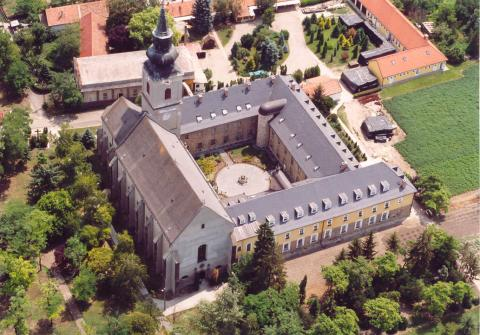
- Church in Jászberény

- Flag Coat of arms
- Nickname: Capital of Jászság
- Location of Jászberény Jászberény (Hungary) Jászberény (Europe)
- Coordinates: 47°30′0″N 19°55′0″E
- Country: Hungary
- County: Jász-Nagykun-Szolnok
- District: Jászberény

Government
  - Mayor: Lóránt Budai (Together for Jászberény)

Area
  - Total: 221.35 km^{2} (85.46 sq mi)

Population (2019)
  - Total: 27,439
  - Rank: 2nd in Jász-Nagykun-Szolnok
  - Density: 127.8/km^{2} (331/sq mi)
- Time zone: UTC+1 (CET)
  - Summer (DST): UTC+2 (CEST)
- Postal code: 5100
- Area code: (+36) 57
- Website: www.jaszbereny.hu

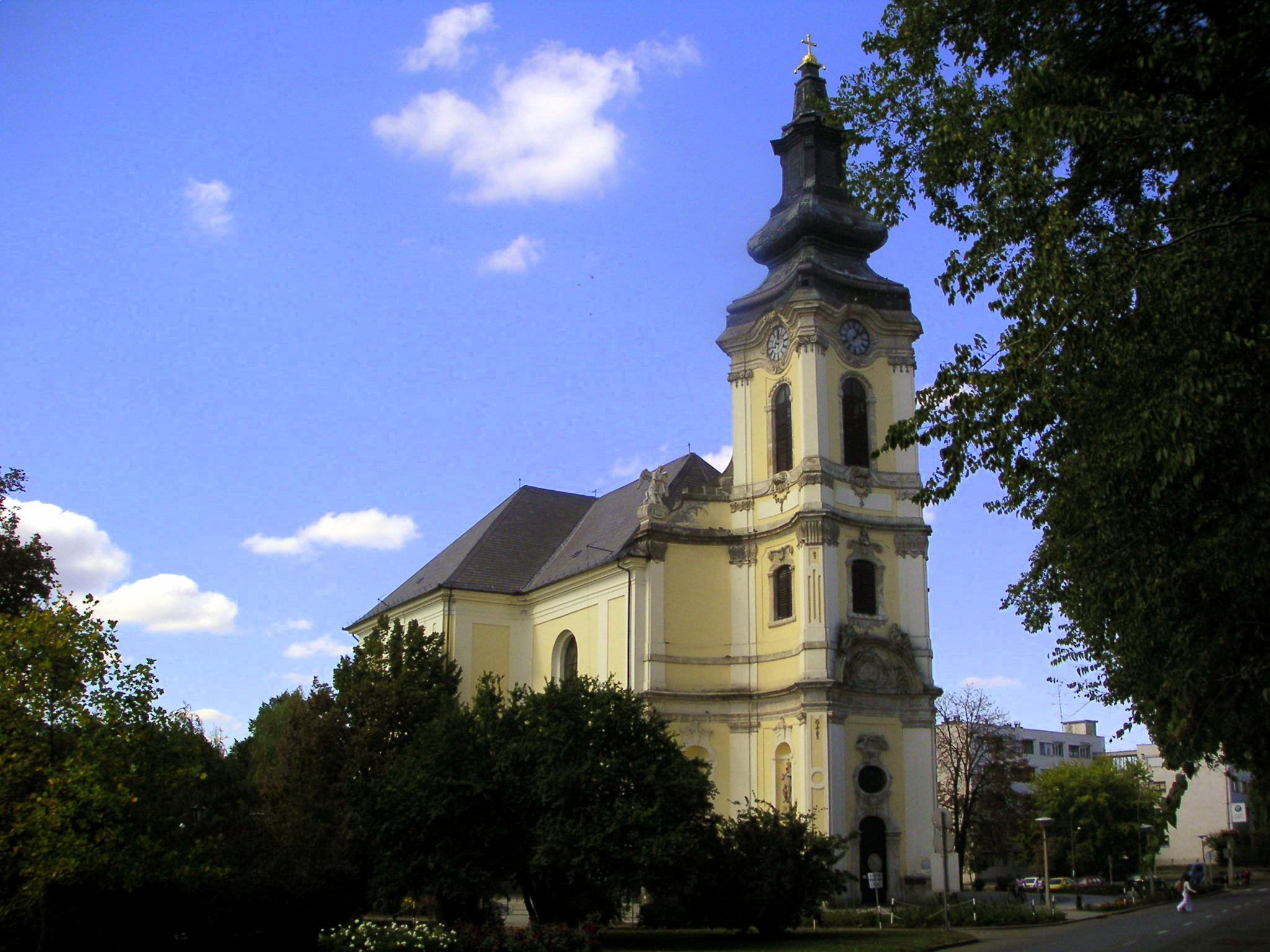
The main church in the center of Jaszberény

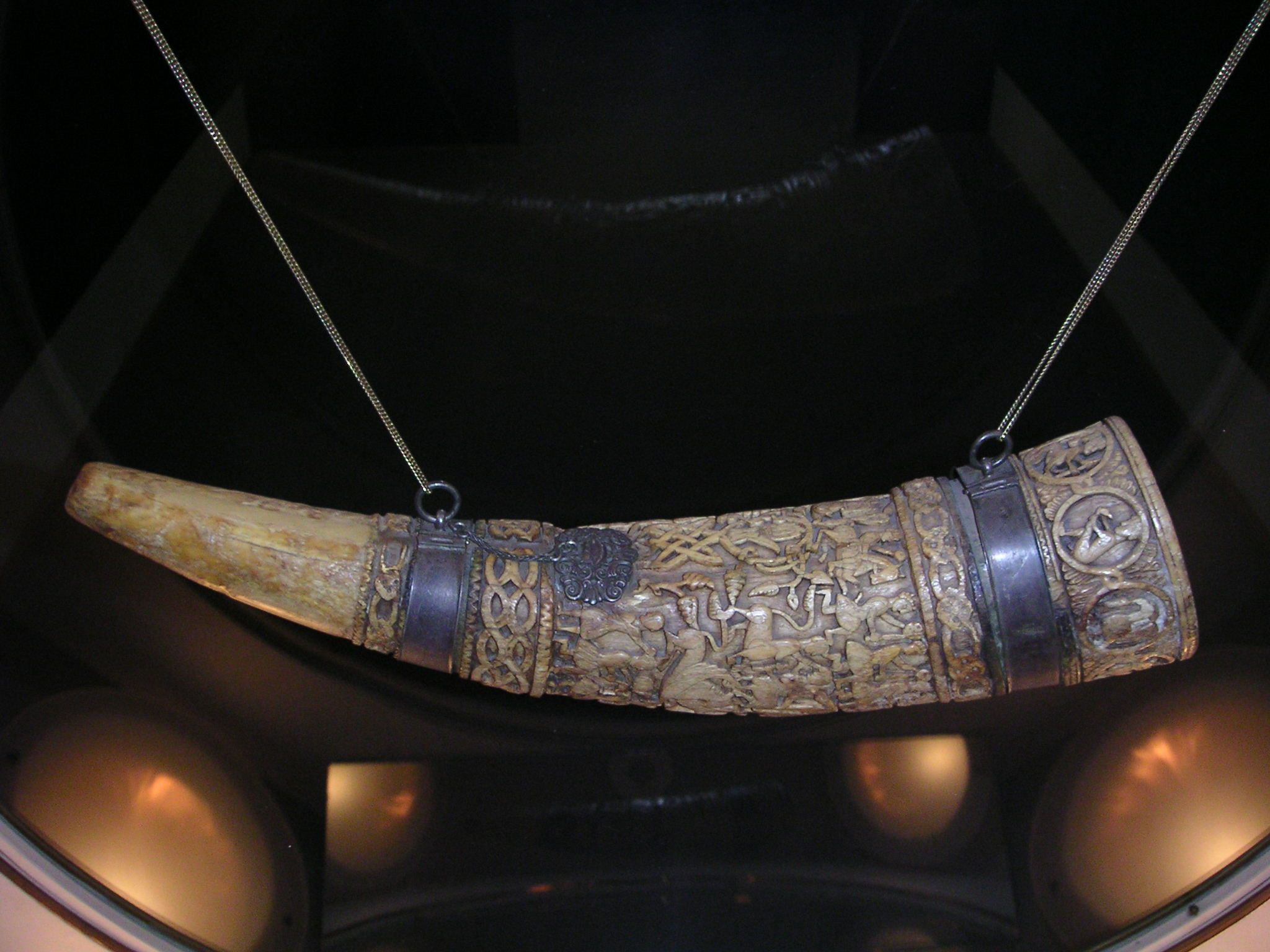
The horn of Lehel kept in Jászberény

Jászberény is a city and market centre in Jász-Nagykun-Szolnok county in Hungary.

== Location ==
Jászberény is located in central Hungary, on the Zagyva River, a tributary of the Tisza River. It is about 60 km (37 mi) from Budapest.

== History ==
The oldest archeological finds from the Jászság, the area around Jászberény, originate from nomadic people of the stone-age and date back 16500 years B.C. Excavations (2002) in Jászberény and Jásztelek aiming for traces of the hunter and gatherers of the Mesolithic in the northern part of the Great Hungarian Plain by Róbert Kertész detected distinct indications of settlements. During this period, the climate in the region began to warm up. Thus, the ice-age coniferous forests were gradually replaced by deciduous forests, the eco-system changed and a new fauna was established in the Carpathian basin. Under the pressure of climate change, the formerly nomadic people settled down. Traces from that time indicate that people actively planted common hazel thus establishing an early form of agriculture.

Further south from the region, tillage and animal husbandry were already established during the same period. Since the development of agriculture in the Carpathian basin was determining for the development in Europe, this findings represent a mile-stone in archeology.

At about 6000 B.C. permanently inhabited settlements were established along the paleo-Zagyva river. Around 2800 B.C., people from further south, commanding bronze-castings began to settle the areas. From that time, settlements in the form of tells are proven. These represent the most northern find of that specific form.

Around 400 to 300 B.C. traces of Celtic people coming from the west are found in the Jászság. Celtic graveyards were found near Jászberény at Hajta and Jászjákohalma. During the first century A.D. Iatzygic tribes migrated from Sarmatia to the later Jászság. After being defeated by the Romans during the Marcomannic Wars, the Iazyges paid tribute to Rome and they became a part of the Roman border-defence at the Limes Sarmatiae. Their settlements can be still found during the invasion of the Huns in the 5th century A.D. In the middle of the 6th. century, Eurasian Avars began to settle the Jász-region who in turn were pushed away around 895 by the immigrating Hungarians.

During the regency of Béla IV of Hungary in the 13th century, Jasz people (sometimes mistaken for the formerly settling Iazyges), requested permission to settle in the Carpathian basin and were assigned the Jász-region. Based on language studies, these people can be traced to Indo-Iranians origins. Their former designation of Ász changed under Turkish and Slavic influences to Jász. Their settlements ranged from the southern borders of the Mátra westward to the Gödöllő Hills (Hungarian Gödöllői-dombság), eastwards almost to the river Tisza and south to the modern-day Szolnok. South of them, the Kipchaks (Hungarian Kun) were settled. In the 15th century, these two regions formed a castle-district with the center at Berény, which also became county-capital of the Jász-Nagykun-Szolnok County until 1876.

1536, the Jászság was attacked and conquered by Turkish forces. They established a military post at Jászberény in the remains of the former Franciscan abbey and the 1472 erected church.

After the end of the Turkish rule, Leopold I sold the Jászság to the Teutonic Knights (22. March 1702) and disestablished the privileges of the county. The Teutonic Knights also took Jászberény as main seat and made it the official capital of the county Jászkun, consisting out of Jászság, Kiskunság and Nagykunság. In the general population, the sale was opposed. The region therefore supported Francis II Rákóczi in Rákóczi's War of Independence but, after defeat, they took to legal means, collected the required sum and bought their own county back. 1745, the re-buy (redemption) was approved by Maria Theresa of Austria who also reestablished the county's privileges.

As a consequence of the Hungarian Revolution of 1848, the autonomous administration of the Jászkun region were abolished again. The three-part region was divided up and parts were assigned to two new counties with the capitals of Jászberény and Jászápati.

1860, the region regained its self-administration for the last time only to ultimately lose it 1877. Kiskunság was divided between the Pest and the Bács comitat. Jászság and Nagykunság formed the new comitat of Jász-Nagykun-Szolnok. The new capital of the comitat became Szolnok and Jászberény lost its former importance.

In the 1950s, various industrial firms chose to settle in Jászberény which had been very much an agricultural community up to this point. This development resulted in an increase in the number and type of jobs available and brought increased prosperity to the inhabitants of Jászberény. Despite the economic difficulties of recent years, Jászberény has continued to grow and has been able to invest in the necessary infrastructure. At the same time, more and more firms have chosen Jászberény as a centre for their operations. However, Jászberény not only values economic growth but has also developed into a cultural center of national renown.

== Industry ==
Jászberény has long been known for its refrigerator factory. It is currently owned by Electrolux. Notable companies in the city include Jász Plasztik Kft. (plastic products) and Szatmári Kft..

== Transport ==
Jászkun Volán operates multiple routes of local buses, mostly between the city centre and the industrial district. The station for long distance buses is located in the city centre, with direct services to Budapest and various other cities. Jászberény also has a train station further away from the city centre. MÁV operates hourly services on weekdays to Hatvan and Szolnok.

== Politics ==
The current mayor of Jászberény is Budai Lóránt.

The local Municipal Assembly has 14 members divided into 2 political parties and alliances:

Party	Seats	2024 Council
Jointly for Jászberény Association	10	
Fidesz	4	

In the 2024 municipal elections the Jointly for Jászberény Association, made up of civil and opposition parties, won all electoral districts. The government-ruling Fidesz sent assembly members through compensation list.

== Twin towns – sister cities ==
Jászberény is twinned with:

- Conselve, Italy
- Lajosmizse, Hungary
- Lunca de Sus, Romania
- Sângeorgiu de Mureș, Romania
- Sedalia, United States
- Sucha Beskidzka, Poland
- Tiachiv, Ukraine
- Topoľčany, Slovakia
- Vechta, Germany
- Yazd, Iran
- Durham, County Durham, England
