= Jászágó =

- Village
- Coat of arms

- Location within Hungary
- Coordinates: 47°35′26″N 19°51′55″E
- Country: Hungary
- County: Jász-Nagykun-Szolnok
- District: Jászberény

Area
  - Total: 36.93 km^{2} (14.26 sq mi)

Population (2016)
  - Total: 714
  - Density: 19.4/km^{2} (50/sq mi)
- Time zone: UTC+1 (CET)
  - Summer (DST): UTC+2 (CEST)
- Postal code: 5124
- Area code(s): (+36) 57

Jászágó is a village in Jász-Nagykun-Szolnok county, in the Northern Great Plain region of central Hungary.

== Geography ==
It covers an area of 36.93 km^{2} (14 sq mi) and has a population of 716 people (2013 estimate).

== Population ==
Year	1980	1990	2001	2010	2011	2013
Population	1,052 (census)	830 (census)	726 (census)	713 (estimate)	706 (census)	716 (estimate)
