= Jászdózsa =

- Village
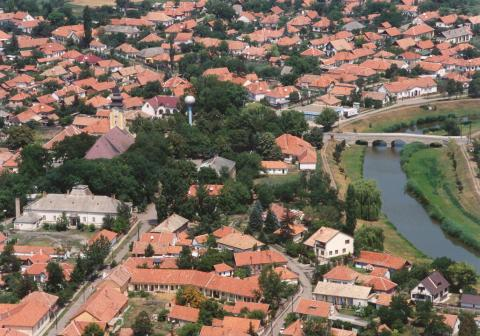
- Aerial view

- Coat of arms

- Location within Hungary
- Coordinates: 47°34′00″N 20°01′00″E
- Country: Hungary
- County: Jász-Nagykun-Szolnok
- District: Jászapáti

Area
  - Total: 42.86 km^{2} (16.55 sq mi)

Population (2001)
  - Total: 2,262
  - Density: 52.8/km^{2} (137/sq mi)
- Time zone: UTC+1 (CET)
  - Summer (DST): UTC+2 (CEST)
- Postal code: 5122
- Area code(s): (+36) 57

Jászdózsa is a village in Jász-Nagykun-Szolnok county in central Hungary, in the Jász region. It is located on the banks of the Tarna river and approximately 100 km (62 mi) east of Budapest.

The village is on the Vámosgyörk–Újszász–Szolnok railway line.

== History ==
Its name first appears in documents dating back to 1344.

== Tourist sights ==
- Roman Catholic church on the main square, built in 1777 and reconstructed in 1872.
- Old stone bridge across the Tarna River, built between 1811 and 1813.
- Small local museum.
