= Jászalsószentgyörgy =

- Village
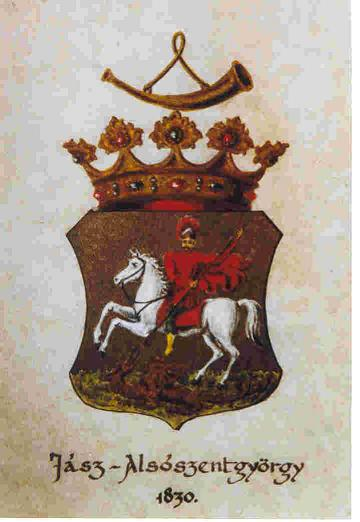
- Coat of arms

- Location within Hungary
- Coordinates: 47°22′18″N 20°05′28″E
- Country: Hungary
- County: Jász-Nagykun-Szolnok
- District: Jászapáti

Area
  - Total: 47.67 km^{2} (18.41 sq mi)

Population (2013)
  - Total: 3,482
  - Density: 73/km^{2} (190/sq mi)
- Time zone: UTC+1 (CET)
  - Summer (DST): UTC+2 (CEST)
- Postal code: 5054
- Area code(s): (+36) 57

Jászalsószentgyörgy is a village in Jász-Nagykun-Szolnok county, in the Northern Great Plain region of central Hungary.

== History ==
As the carved stones found at the site of the first settlement of the village - where the ancestors lived for 300 years - prove, there must have been a church in the so-called "Telken" as well. There is a written record from 1389 - some researchers claim - which states: "a Jassic dwelling again bears the name of Saint George." This does not indicate the time of the village's formation but rather that the settlement built a church in honor of Saint George at that time and named the village accordingly. In 1686, after the end of the Turkish occupation, and with no authorities or justice in place, internal conflicts erupted among the settlements over land ownership. Szentgyörgy was no exception to this. It was in constant conflict with Ladány. The conflicts escalated to the point where the people of Ladány set fire to the dwelling known as "Telek" of Szentgyörgy and drove the residents away. As a result of the turmoil, the church was also destroyed. The new dwelling was located 1 km east of the current church. This was the so-called "Putrik-part." Using the stones of the old church, they built a larger thatched-roof building, which was used as a church. However, the settlement was located there for only about 30 years.

In 1701, the residents of the village decided to build a new and larger church instead of the old thatched-roof one. In 1702, they began transporting the necessary building materials to the site for the new church. The first mass was held on June 3, 1703, on Trinity Sunday, in the new church, even though the church was not yet completed. On Christmas 1703, they moved the church equipment from the thatched church to the new church, and the Christmas Mass was celebrated there by the then parish priest, Mihály Gyetvay. On December 12, 1704, Bishop Telekesy gave permission to consecrate the new cemetery - traditionally located around the church. The renovation of the church lasted from 1710 to 1714, but its furnishings took many decades. In 1786, the residents of the village decided to build a larger church that would better suit the needs of the time, instead of the "small" church built in 1703. They planned to build the new church at the same location as the old one, so they began dismantling the old church's tower in 1787, the year the new church construction was approved. The necessary plans for approval were prepared by the master builder Károly Rabl from Gyöngyös, and he also contracted the construction work with the council. In 1790, agreements were made with the craftsmen and suppliers. After the agreements were made, work began rapidly. In 1791, the walls of the new church were already standing, and the dressed stones were delivered from Demén and the lime from Szőllős. The roof was completed that same year. The church was consecrated to the Holy Trinity in 1791 by Gábor Nagy, the parish priest of Jászapáti. Most of the remaining work was finished in 1792, and the tower was completed in 1793. This date is indicated on the western facade of the tower as the date of completion.

The church was built in the Baroque style and is the only significant historical monument in our village. Its length is 46 meters, height is 46 meters, and width is 13 meters. The interesting feature of the church interior is the gallery that runs all around, which was an attempt to solve seating problems. Some of the interior furnishings were made at the expense of the public, while others were added over the years through the donations of devout parishioners. The walls between the high altar and its frame are made of black and gray marble by János Pércsi, a master from Gyöngyös. The tabernacle and the two winged angels beside it, as well as the statues of Saint Stephen on the right and Saint Ladislaus on the left, were crafted by Simon Kurinszki, a sculptor from Gyöngyös. The painting of the sanctuary, depicting Saint George with the dragon, as well as the painting and gilding of the organ, were done by Ferenc Farenzon, a painter from Eger. The pulpit was made by a woodcarver from Eger, following the pattern of the pulpit in the Franciscan church in Eger. The church has 42 oak pews, which were cut and dried in the forest of Tárkány and installed by carpenter Oberfrank from Eger. The first large altarpiece, depicting the coronation of the Virgin Mary by the Holy Trinity, was painted by Ferenc Lochbiller, a painter from Pest. He also painted the first altarpiece in the central nave of the church, which depicts Christ on the cross embracing Mary Magdalene and the engagement of Mary. The other two side altars in the church's central nave were created later, and the altar itself was made from wood by Márton Kovács, a local resident.

One of the side altars was erected by the village in 1831 upon the end of the great cholera epidemic, and the other one in 1844 by the Maria Reading Society. Both altarpieces were painted by Alajos Sajósy. One altar depicts Hungarian saints following the original by Szoldatics, and the other is the Sorrowful Altar, which shows the crucified Christ in Mary's arms. The third side altar is the Holy Cross Altar, which depicts Christ on the cross, and the fourth altarpiece features Saint Anne teaching Mary in the company of Saint Joachim. The second and current main altarpiece of the church also depicts the Holy Trinity. It was painted by Alajos Sajósy, an academic painting teacher, following Van Dyck's work, and it remains the pride of the church, measuring more than four meters in height and over two meters in width, and is one of the masterpieces of art painting. Two oval-shaped artworks by an unknown artist are placed above the two confessionals; one depicts the prodigal son, and the other portrays Penitent Mary Magdalene. In 1814, the 12-stop organ was expanded by Emanuel Kummel, an organ builder. The baptistry is also a work of art, with a depiction of the Baptism of Christ by John the Baptist in the Jordan River on the top, beautifully gilded.

The church's interior is illuminated by nine large windows, decorated with colorful painted mosaic glass by Miksa Róth. One of the windows depicts the Holy Trinity as the protector of the church. Another window features Saint George the Dragon Slayer, riding a horse and bearing the crowned emblem of the village, with the colors of the Jász people. The church's special feature is the series of frescoes painted on its domes. The celestial blue and gold-starred ceiling of the church includes a depiction of the royal harpist with a harp over the organ, representing the origin of Christ as a king through his royal blood and the apotheosis of church song. In the second dome, you can see the Nativity of Christ.

=== Jews in Jászalsószentgyörgy ===
The Jewish community in the town was composed of upstanding citizens. Their children received education, and many of them became traders following their parents' example. They were hardworking, diligent individuals who maintained good relations with the local population, even during the antisemitic propaganda of World War II.

The 1840 law and the 1849 imperial constitution allowed Jewish individuals to settle freely in various parts of the country, including the Jász-ság region. Initially, the community was isolated and limited to trading at fairs and weekly markets. After 1849, they had the opportunity to settle more freely, and they quickly assumed the role of traders in nearly every city and village in the Jász-ság. In the 1850s, they began to appear in Jászalsószentgyörgy, and by 1855, there were already 34 Jewish residents. According to the 1870 census, nine Jewish families paid a rabbi tax of 12 forints. In the decades of the dual monarchy, the number of Jewish families moving in started to increase significantly, surpassing a population of a hundred within a few decades, indicating that they saw good business opportunities in the town's urban status at the time.

In 1893, the town's census indicated 170 people of the Mosaic faith, accounting for 3.6% of the total population of 4,687. Before World War I, 20 Jewish families lived in the town. Their numbers decreased after the war due to fewer births and emigration, but in the 1920s and 1930s, new arrivals caused the population to rise again. In 1941, there were 81 people in 28 Jewish families. During the Holocaust in 1944, 86 people lived in the town, and they were subjected to inhumane treatment and were taken to extermination camps by the German authorities. Those who survived the Holocaust, some of whom returned to the town, were unable to revive the life of the Jewish community or continue their commercial activities, leading many to leave for the capital or abroad.

After emancipation in the 1860s, the Jewish population of the town assimilated, particularly in the field of commerce. Despite maintaining their religious traditions and leading somewhat secluded family lives, business interests required them to maintain close relationships with other segments of the population, particularly the farmers. Jewish traders knew how to build their customer base, often welcoming them with braided challah and candy. Jewish women also played a significant role in the businesses and were involved in matchmaking. To facilitate good business deals, for example, Soma Édelmann's wife, Hanni Weiner, served coffee with milk foam, raisin challah, and laska in a small room next to the store. It is certain that not all peasant families always had enough money to buy various goods, but they could often take items on credit, and in return, offer a well-fed goose as interest. On Friday evenings, when the stars appeared in the sky, the Jews no longer worked but socialized or sat outside on the porch. Tilda, the daughter of the old Richter, who was known as the milkwoman, always invited her best customers and offered them freshly baked challah.

Every family in the Jewish community earned respect, not just through their wealth but also due to their hard work and diligence. The local peasants and craftsmen were also known for their industriousness. Although they did not play a prominent role in public life, their opinions were always respected in the town. They were often addressed as "tejes úr" or "tejes asszony," (meaning milkman/milk sir and milklady) but they were primarily known by their nicknames.

== Geography ==
It covers an area of 47.67 km^{2} (18 sq mi) and has a population of 3,482 people (2013 estimate).

== Population ==
Year	1980	1990	2001	2010	2011	2013
Population	4,157 (census)	3,831 (census)	3,836 (census)	3,515 (estimate)	3,550 (census)	3,482 (estimate)
