= Jászivány =

- Village
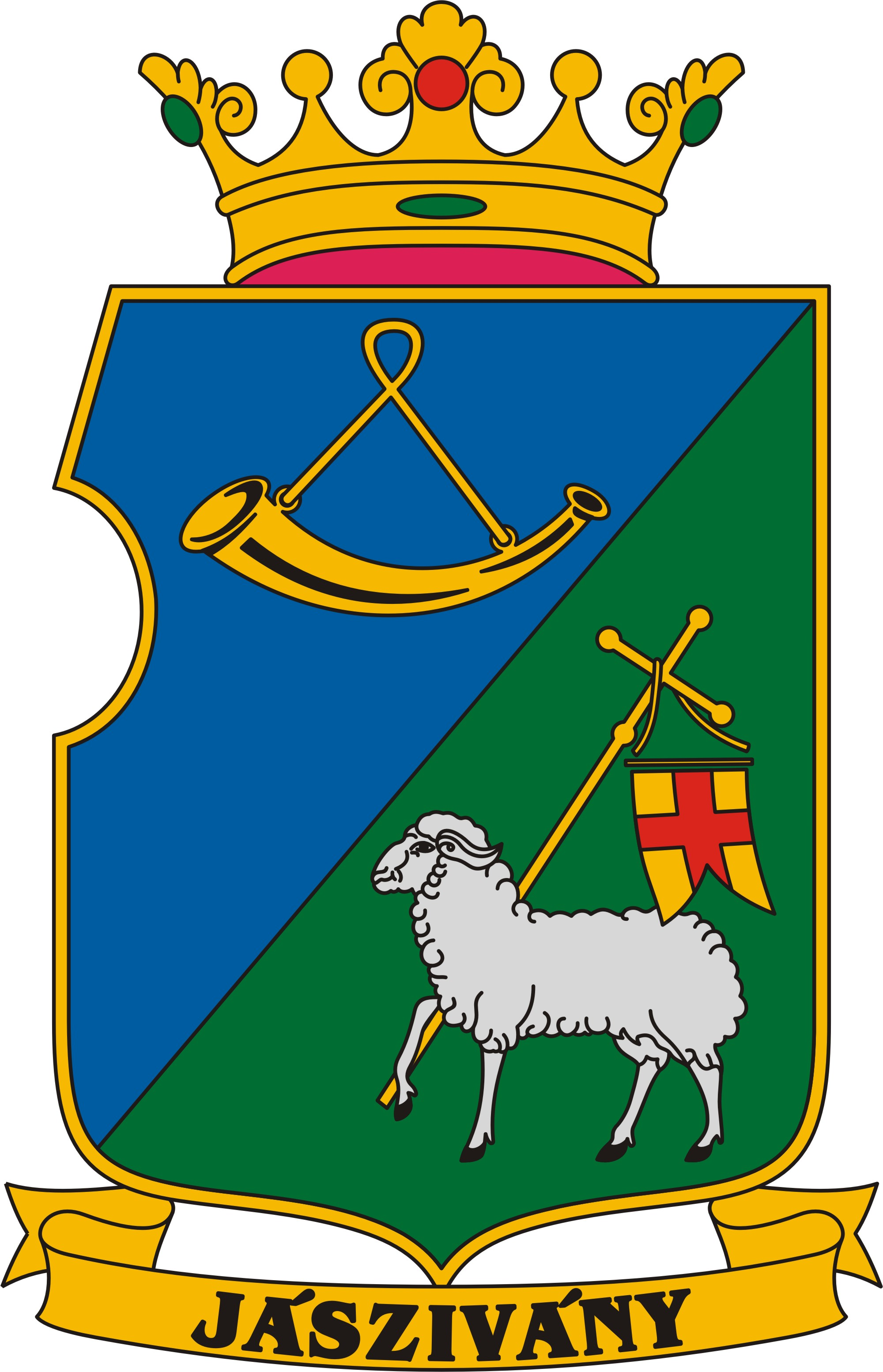
- Coat of arms

- Location within Hungary
- Coordinates: 47°32′00″N 20°15′00″E
- Country: Hungary
- County: Jász-Nagykun-Szolnok
- District: Jászapáti

Area
  - Total: 39.51 km^{2} (15.25 sq mi)

Population (2001)
  - Total: 429
  - Density: 10.86/km^{2} (28.1/sq mi)
- Time zone: UTC+1 (CET)
  - Summer (DST): UTC+2 (CEST)
- Postal code: 5135
- Area code(s): (+36) 57

Jászivány is a village in Jász-Nagykun-Szolnok County, in the Northern Great Plain region of central Hungary.

== Geography ==
It covers an area of 39.51 km^{2} (15 sq mi) and has a population of 429 people (2001).
