= Jánoshida =

- Village
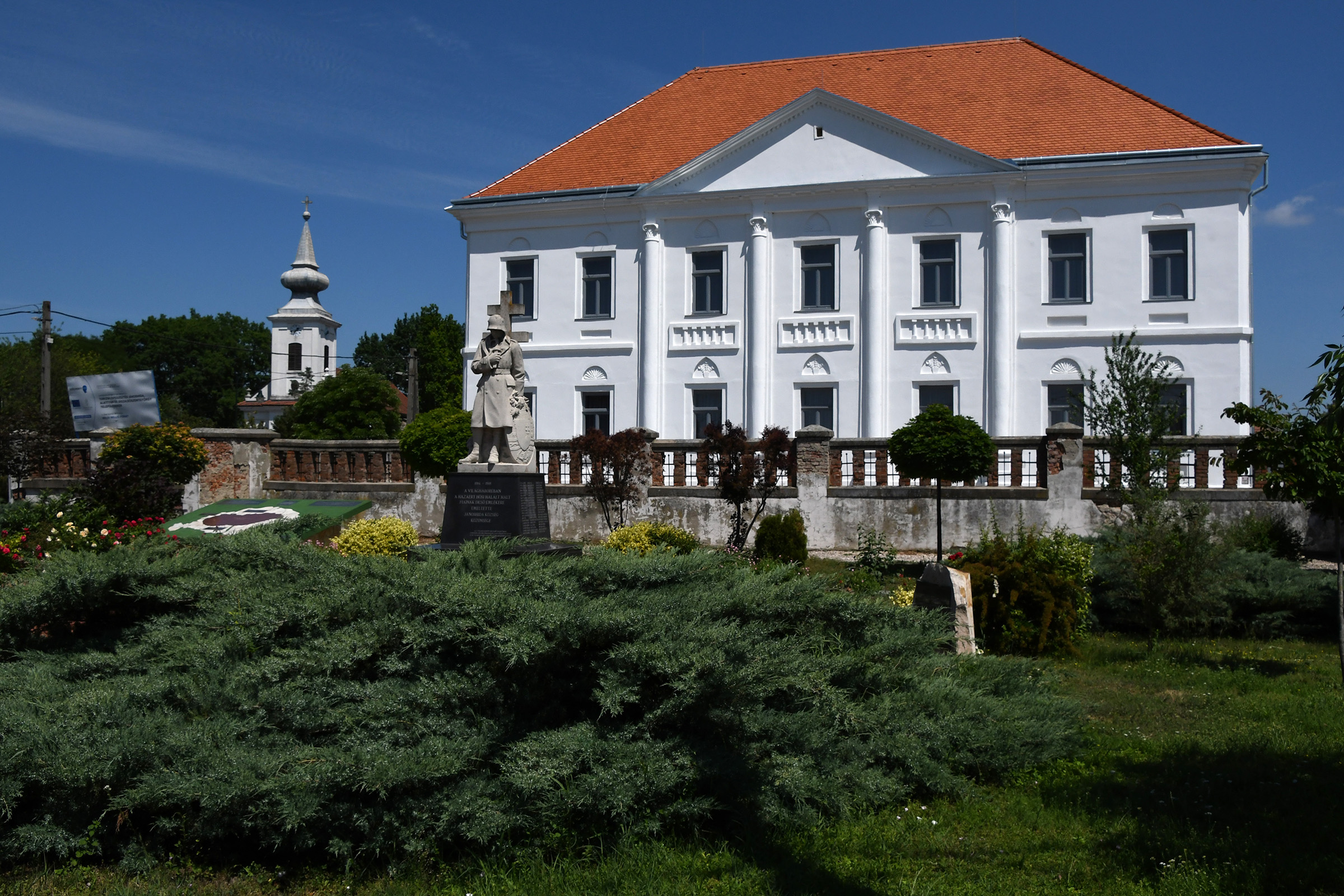
- The former Premonstratensian monastery with the tower of the Roman Catholic church in the background

- Coat of arms

- Location within Hungary
- Coordinates: 47°23′11″N 20°03′29″E
- Country: Hungary
- County: Jász-Nagykun-Szolnok
- District: Jászapáti

Area
  - Total: 34.79 km^{2} (13.43 sq mi)

Population (2015)
  - Total: 2,394
  - Density: 78.33/km^{2} (202.9/sq mi)
- Time zone: UTC+1 (CET)
  - Summer (DST): UTC+2 (CEST)
- Postal code: 5143
- Area code(s): (+36) 57
- Website: http://www.janoshida.hu/

Jánoshida is a village in Jász-Nagykun-Szolnok county, in the Northern Great Plain region of central Hungary.

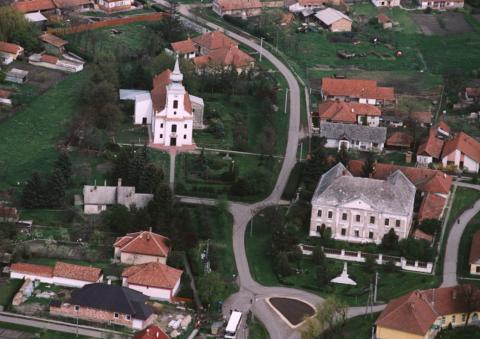
Aerial view

It covers an area of 34.79 km^{2} (13 sq mi) and has a population of 2,394 people (2015).

== History ==
The earliest signs are from archaeologic finds of Bronze Age (1800-1700 BC). An Avarian flute was found from c. 6-7 AD. In 1186 Béla III of Hungary donated the village to the premontre priests and they built a church. The romanesque style of the church resembles to those of bishop of Vác, or archbishop of Esztergom. The patrocinium of the church was John the Baptist. The name of the village had been at that time Szentkereszt (The Holy Cross), and later has got the name of Jánoshida (The bridge of John). The church was the centre of the provostry. In 1536 the village and the church was destroyed in the Turkish wars. Only after 1688, the year of liberation from the Turkish occupation could the village and church have been rebuilt. In 1715 the village belonged to Pest County. The church have been rebuilt in barock style. The church has got classicist style facade in 1830. In 1854 Jánoshida has been moved to Heves County. Finally, in 1876 it was moved to Jász-Nagykun-Szolnok County.

== Sightseeings ==
The church with details remained and preserved in romanesque style is the most attractive tourist sightseeing in Jánoshida. The southern doorway of the chapel is in romanesque style and the monastery can be also visited.
