= Jászjákóhalma =

- Village
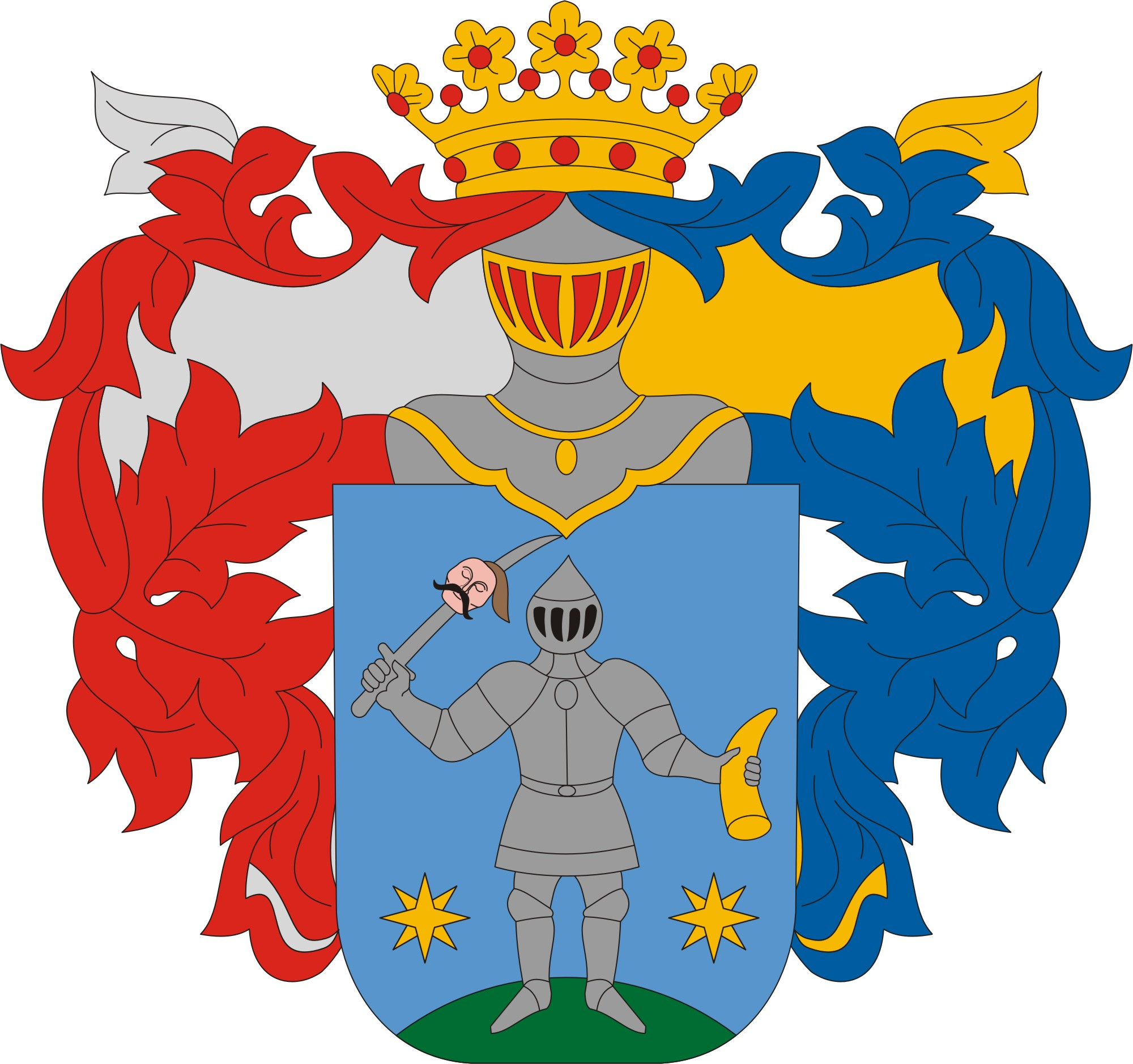
- Coat of arms

- Location within Hungary
- Coordinates: 47°31′22″N 19°59′16″E
- Country: Hungary
- County: Jász-Nagykun-Szolnok
- District: Jászberény

Area
  - Total: 45.04 km^{2} (17.39 sq mi)

Population (2001)
  - Total: 3,125
  - Density: 69.38/km^{2} (179.7/sq mi)
- Time zone: UTC+1 (CET)
  - Summer (DST): UTC+2 (CEST)
- Postal code: 5121
- Area code(s): (+36) 57

Jászjákóhalma is a village in Jász-Nagykun-Szolnok county, in the Northern Great Plain region of central Hungary.

== Geography ==
It covers an area of 45.04 km^{2} (17 sq mi) and has a population of 3125 people (2001).
