= Jászszentandrás =

- Village
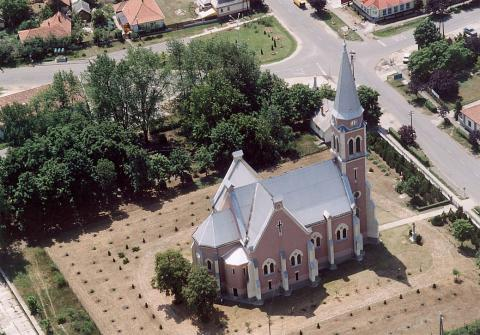

- Coat of arms

- Location within Hungary
- Coordinates: 47°34′57″N 20°10′25″E
- Country: Hungary
- County: Jász-Nagykun-Szolnok
- District: Jászapáti

Area
  - Total: 44.33 km^{2} (17.12 sq mi)

Population (2015)
  - Total: 2,440
  - Density: 55/km^{2} (140/sq mi)
- Time zone: UTC+1 (CET)
  - Summer (DST): UTC+2 (CEST)
- Postal code: 5136
- Area code(s): (+36) 57

Jászszentandrás is a village in Jász-Nagykun-Szolnok county, in the Northern Great Plain region of central Hungary.

== Geography ==
It covers an area of 44.33 km^{2} (17 sq mi).

== Population ==
It has a population of 2440 people (2015).
