= Jászboldogháza =

- Village
- Coat of arms

- Location within Hungary
- Coordinates: 47°22′14″N 19°59′51″E
- Country: Hungary
- County: Jász-Nagykun-Szolnok
- District: Jászberény

Area
  - Total: 55.31 km^{2} (21.36 sq mi)

Population (2016)
  - Total: 1,684
  - Density: 33.09/km^{2} (85.7/sq mi)
- Time zone: UTC+1 (CET)
  - Summer (DST): UTC+2 (CEST)
- Postal code: 5144
- Area code(s): (+36) 57

Jászboldogháza is a village in Jász-Nagykun-Szolnok county, in the Northern Great Plain region of central Hungary.

== Geography ==
The village is around 70 km east of Budapest. It covers an area of 55.31 km^{2} (21 sq mi) and has a population of 1830 people (2001).
