= Jászkisér =

- Town
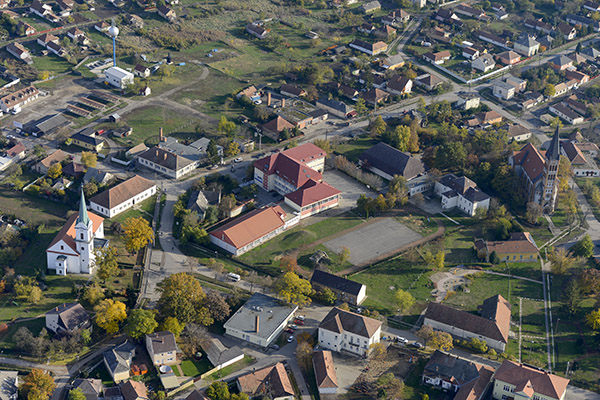
- Aerial view

- Flag Coat of arms

- Location within Hungary
- Coordinates: 47°27′18″N 20°12′6″E
- Country: Hungary
- County: Jász-Nagykun-Szolnok
- District: Jászapáti

Area
  - Total: 130.1 km^{2} (50.2 sq mi)

Population (2014)
  - Total: 5,480
  - Density: 42.6/km^{2} (110/sq mi)
- Time zone: UTC+1 (CET)
  - Summer (DST): UTC+2 (CEST)
- Postal code: 5137
- Area code: (+36) 57
- Website: www.jaszkiser.hu

Jászkisér is a town in Jász-Nagykun-Szolnok county, in the Northern Great Plain region of central Hungary.

== Geography ==
It covers an area of 130.11 km^{2} (50 sq mi) and has a population of 5,546 people (2013 estimate).

== Population ==
| Year | 1980 | 1990 | 2001 | 2010 | 2011 | 2013 |
| Population | 6,346 (census) | 5,802 (census) | 5,778 (census) | 5,317 (estimate) | 5,467 (census) | 5,546 (estimate) |

== International relations ==
Jászkisér is twinned with:

- Niederlenz, Switzerland
- Stara Moravica, Serbia
- Szczyrk, Poland
