= Jászladány =

- Large village
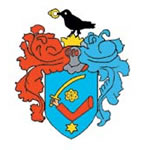
- Coat of arms

- Location within Hungary
- Coordinates: 47°21′53″N 20°09′52″E
- Country: Hungary
- County: Jász-Nagykun-Szolnok
- District: Jászapáti

Area
  - Total: 92.73 km^{2} (35.80 sq mi)

Population (2013)
  - Total: 5,642
  - Density: 60.8/km^{2} (157/sq mi)
- Time zone: UTC+1 (CET)
  - Summer (DST): UTC+2 (CEST)
- Postal code: 5055
- Area code(s): (+36) 57

Jászladány is a large village in Jász-Nagykun-Szolnok county, in the Northern Great Plain region of central Hungary.

== Geography ==
It covers an area of 92.73 km^{2} (36 sq mi) and has a population of 5,642 people (2013 estimate).

== History ==
The archaeological findings of the region are mainly from the Copper Age and the Roman Age. According to Ferenc Fodor, it was mentioned for the first time in 1067, in the foundation charter of the Zászty Abbey.

Other sources highlight the written mention in 1399 (Ladán), in 1550 it is called Jász Ladán, in 1567 it is called Jaz Ladány, in 1828 it is mentioned in various documents as Ladány, and in 1910 it is already mentioned under its current name, Jászladány. The origin of its name is unknown, but some derive it from the word "lada". Ferenc Fodor assumes that it was originally inhabited by the Pechenegs.

After the upheavals of the Turkish times, the settlement was repopulated, the parish was established, its stone church was built in 1736, and it became an independent mother church. In 1745, Jászladány was included among the redemptive settlements, and in 1828, King Ferenc I granted Ladány four national fairs together with the status of a market town, but in 1876, the town status of the settlement ceased. Some of the families moved to Benepuszta in Kiskunság, owned by the city, where an independent village was established in 1907.

The circular dam surrounding Ladány was completed in March 1856 in just 3 weeks with the manual labor of the people living here. The settlement was connected to the national railway network in 1882, thereby ending its previous isolation.

Content in this edit is translated from the existing Hungarian Wikipedia article at hu:Jászladány; see its history for attribution.

== Population ==
Year	1980	1990	2001	2010	2011	2013
Population	6,659 (census)	6,028 (census)	6,194 (census)	5,861 (estimate)	5,614 (census)	5,642 (estimate)
