= List of populated places in Hungary (T) =

This is a list of cities, towns and villages of Hungary

KEY: T = Town ; V = Village

Name	Rank	County	District	Population	Post code
Tab	T	Somogy	Tabi	4,879	8660
Tabajd	V	Fejér	Bicskei	957	8088
Tabdi	V	Bács-Kiskun	Kiskorösi	1,195	6224
Táborfalva	V	Pest	Dabasi	3,423	2381
Tác	V	Fejér	Abai	1,499	8121
Tagyon	V	Veszprém	Balatonfüredi	90	8272
Tahitótfalu	V	Pest	Szentendrei	4,669	2021
Takácsi	V	Veszprém	Pápai	933	8541
Tákos	V	Szabolcs-Szatmár-Bereg	Vásárosnaményi	411	4845
Taksony	V	Pest	Ráckevei	5,941	2335
Taktabáj	V	Borsod-Abaúj-Zemplén	Tokaji	648	3926
Taktaharkány	V	Borsod-Abaúj-Zemplén	Szerencsi	4,074	3922
Taktakenéz	V	Borsod-Abaúj-Zemplén	Szerencsi	1,235	3924
Taktaszada	V	Borsod-Abaúj-Zemplén	Szerencsi	2,127	3921
Taliándörögd	V	Veszprém	Tapolcai	718	8295
Tállya	V	Borsod-Abaúj-Zemplén	Szerencsi	2,179	3907
Tamási	T	Tolna	Tamási	9,761	7090
Tanakajd	V	Tolna	Szombathelyi	734	9762
Táp	V	Gyor-Moson-Sopron	Pannonhalmi	712	9095
Tápióbicske	V	Pest	Nagykátai	3,419	2764
Tápiógyörgye	V	Pest	Nagykátai	3,709	2767
Tápióság	V	Pest	Nagykátai	2,701	2253
Tápiószecső	V	Pest	Nagykátai	6,371	2251
Tápiószele	V	Pest	Nagykátai	6,041	2766
Tápiószentmárton	V	Pest	Nagykátai	5,462	2711
Tápiószőlős	V	Pest	Ceglédi	3,033	2769
Táplánszentkereszt	V	Tolna	Szombathelyi	2,402	9761
Tapolca	T	Veszprém	Tapolcai	17,738	8300
Tapsony	V	Somogy	Marcali	870	8718
Tápszentmiklós	V	Gyor-Moson-Sopron	Pannonhalmi	945	9094
Tar	V	Nógrád	Pásztói	2,011	3073
Tarany	V	Somogy	Nagyatádi	1,273	7514
Tarcal	V	Borsod-Abaúj-Zemplén	Tokaji	3,315	3915
Tard	V	Borsod-Abaúj-Zemplén	Mezokövesdi	1,436	3416
Tardona	V	Borsod-Abaúj-Zemplén	Kazincbarcikai	1,120	3644
Tardos	V	Komárom-Esztergom	Tatai	1,637	2834
Tarhos	V	Békés	Békési	1,070	5641
Tarján	V	Komárom-Esztergom	Tatabányai	2,828	6700
Tarjánpuszta	V	Gyor-Moson-Sopron	Pannonhalmi	390	9092
Tárkány	V	Komárom-Esztergom	Kisbéri	1,628	2945
Tarnabod	V	Heves	Hevesi	1,033	3369
Tarnalelesz	V	Heves	Pétervásárai	3,713	3258
Tarnaméra	V	Heves	Hevesi	2,826	3284
Tarnaörs	V	Heves	Hevesi	3,028	3294
Tarnaszentmária	V	Heves	Füzesabonyi	1,101	3331
Tarnaszentmiklós	V	Heves	Hevesi	3,500	3382
Tarnazsadány	V	Heves	Hevesi	2,519	3283
Tárnok	V	Pest	Budaörsi	7,845	2461
Tárnokréti	V	Gyor-Moson-Sopron	Csornai	220	9165
Tarpa	V	Szabolcs-Szatmár-Bereg	Vásárosnaményi	2,278	4931
Tarrós	V	Baranya	Sásdi	117	7362
Táska	V	Somogy	Marcali	488	8696
Tass	V	Bács-Kiskun	Kunszentmiklói	2,997	6098
Taszár	V	Somogy	Kaposvári	2,070	7261
Tát	V	Komárom-Esztergom	Esztergomi	5,678	2534
Tata	T	Komárom-Esztergom	Tatai	23,937	2890
Tatabánya	county seat	Komárom-Esztergom	Tatabányai	71,496	2800
Tataháza	V	Bács-Kiskun	Bácsalmási	1,520	6451
Tatárszentgyörgy	V	Pest	Dabasi	1,858	2375
Tázlár	V	Bács-Kiskun	Kiskorösi	1,982	6236
Téglás	T	Hajdú-Bihar	Hajdúhadházi	6,385	4243
Tékes	V	Baranya	Sásdi	266	7381
Teklafalu	V	Baranya	Szigetvári	357	7973
Telekes	V	Vas	Vasvári	533	9812
Telekgerendás	V	Békés	Békéscsabai	1,665	5675
Teleki	V	Somogy	Balatonföldvári	212	8626
Telki	V	Pest	Pilisvörösvári	2,211	2089
Telkibánya	V	Borsod-Abaúj-Zemplén	Abaúj–Hegyközi	694	3896
Tengelic	V	Tolna	Szekszárdi	2,478	7054
Tengeri	V	Baranya	Pécsi	75	7834
Tengőd	V	Somogy	Tabi	588	8668
Tenk	V	Heves	Hevesi	1,234	3359
Tényő	V	Gyor-Moson-Sopron	Téti	1,483	9111
Tépe	V	Hajdú-Bihar	Berettyóújfalui	1,172	4132
Terem	V	Szabolcs-Szatmár-Bereg	Nyírbátori	698	4342
Terény	V	Nógrád	Balassagyarmati	448	2696
Tereske	V	Nógrád	Rétsági	732	2652
Teresztenye	V	Borsod-Abaúj-Zemplén	Edelényi	29	3757
Terpes	V	Heves	Pétervásárai	220	3334
Tés	V	Veszprém	Várpalotai	983	8109
Tésa	V	Pest	Szobi	98	2635
Tésenfa	V	Baranya	Siklósi	216	7843
Téseny	V	Baranya	Pécsi	322	7834
Teskánd	V	Zala	Zalaegerszegi	991	8991
Tét	T	Gyor-Moson-Sopron	Téti	4,136	9100
Tetétlen	V	Hajdú-Bihar	Püspökladányi	1,455	4184
Tevel	V	Tolna	Bonyhádi	1,706	7181
Tibolddaróc	V	Borsod-Abaúj-Zemplén	Mezokövesdi	1,548	3423
Tiborszállás	V	Szabolcs-Szatmár-Bereg	Mátészalkai	1,054	4353
Tihany	V	Veszprém	Balatonfüredi	1,453	8237
Tikos	V	Somogy	Marcali	129	8731
Tilaj	V	Zala	Zalaszentgróti	206	8782
Timár	V	Szabolcs-Szatmár-Bereg	Tiszavasvári	1,451	4466
Tinnye	V	Pest	Pilisvörösvári	1,382	2086
Tiszaadony	V	Szabolcs-Szatmár-Bereg	Vásárosnaményi	728	4833
Tiszaalpár	V	Bács-Kiskun	Kiskunfélegyházi	5,114	6066
Tiszabábolna	V	Borsod-Abaúj-Zemplén	Mezocsáti	492	3465
Tiszabecs	V	Szabolcs-Szatmár-Bereg	Fehérgyarmati	1,055	4951
Tiszabercel	V	Szabolcs-Szatmár-Bereg	Ibrány–Nagyhalászi	2,041	4474
Tiszabezdéd	V	Szabolcs-Szatmár-Bereg	Kisvárdai	2,043	4624
Tiszabő	V	Jász-Nagykun-Szolnok	Törökszentmiklósi	2,051	5232
Tiszabura	V	Jász-Nagykun-Szolnok	Tiszafüredi	2,755	5235
Tiszacsécse	V	Szabolcs-Szatmár-Bereg	Fehérgyarmati	271	4947
Tiszacsege	T	Hajdú-Bihar	Balmazújvárosi	4,927	4066
Tiszacsermely	V	Borsod-Abaúj-Zemplén	Bodrogközi	639	3972
Tiszadada	V	Szabolcs-Szatmár-Bereg	Tiszavasvári	2,515	4455
Tiszaderzs	V	Jász-Nagykun-Szolnok	Tiszafüredi	1,308	5243
Tiszadob	V	Szabolcs-Szatmár-Bereg	Tiszavasvári	3,347	4456
Tiszadorogma	V	Borsod-Abaúj-Zemplén	Mezocsáti	469	3466
Tiszaeszlár	V	Szabolcs-Szatmár-Bereg	Tiszavasvári	2,827	4464
Tiszaföldvár	T	Jász-Nagykun-Szolnok	Kunszentmártoni	12,039	5430
Tiszafüred	T	Jász-Nagykun-Szolnok	Tiszafüredi	12,088	5350
Tiszagyenda	V	Jász-Nagykun-Szolnok	Tiszafüredi	1,040	5233
Tiszagyulaháza	V	Hajdú-Bihar	Polgári	820	4097
Tiszaigar	V	Jász-Nagykun-Szolnok	Tiszafüredi	936	5361
Tiszainoka	V	Jász-Nagykun-Szolnok	Kunszentmártoni	441	5464
Tiszajenő	V	Jász-Nagykun-Szolnok	Szolnoki	1,698	5094
Tiszakanyár	V	Szabolcs-Szatmár-Bereg	Kisvárdai	1,697	4493
Tiszakarád	V	Borsod-Abaúj-Zemplén	Bodrogközi	2,545	3971
Tiszakécske	T	Bács-Kiskun	Kecskeméti	11,860	6060
Tiszakerecseny	V	Szabolcs-Szatmár-Bereg	Vásárosnaményi	983	4834
Tiszakeszi	V	Borsod-Abaúj-Zemplén	Mezocsáti	2,732	3458
Tiszakóród	V	Szabolcs-Szatmár-Bereg	Fehérgyarmati	819	4946
Tiszakürt	V	Jász-Nagykun-Szolnok	Kunszentmártoni	1,605	5471
Tiszaladány	V	Borsod-Abaúj-Zemplén	Tokaji	769	3929
Tiszalök	T	Szabolcs-Szatmár-Bereg	Tiszavasvári	6,071	4450
Tiszalúc	V	Borsod-Abaúj-Zemplén	Szerencsi	5,707	3565
Tiszamogyorós	V	Szabolcs-Szatmár-Bereg	Kisvárdai	735	4645
Tiszanagyfalu	V	Szabolcs-Szatmár-Bereg	Tiszavasvári	1,981	4463
Tiszanána	V	Heves	Hevesi	6,814	3385
Tiszaörs	V	Jász-Nagykun-Szolnok	Tiszafüredi	1,477	5362
Tiszapalkonya	V	Borsod-Abaúj-Zemplén	Tiszaújvárosi	1,550	3587
Tiszapüspöki	V	Jász-Nagykun-Szolnok	Törökszentmiklósi	2,147	5211
Tiszarád	V	Szabolcs-Szatmár-Bereg	Ibrány–Nagyhalászi	542	4503
Tiszaroff	V	Jász-Nagykun-Szolnok	Tiszafüredi	1,863	5234
Tiszasas	V	Jász-Nagykun-Szolnok	Kunszentmártoni	1,155	5474
Tiszasüly	V	Jász-Nagykun-Szolnok	Szolnoki	1,739	5061
Tiszaszalka	V	Szabolcs-Szatmár-Bereg	Vásárosnaményi	953	4831
Tiszaszentimre	V	Jász-Nagykun-Szolnok	Tiszafüredi	2,338	5322
Tiszaszentmárton	V	Szabolcs-Szatmár-Bereg	Kisvárdai	1,270	4628
Tiszasziget	V	Csongrád	Szegedi	1,751	6756
Tiszaszőlős	V	Jász-Nagykun-Szolnok	Tiszafüredi	1,740	5244
Tiszatardos	V	Borsod-Abaúj-Zemplén	Tokaji	253	3928
Tiszatarján	V	Borsod-Abaúj-Zemplén	Mezocsáti	1,472	3589
Tiszatelek	V	Szabolcs-Szatmár-Bereg	Ibrány–Nagyhalászi	1,513	4487
Tiszatenyő	V	Jász-Nagykun-Szolnok	Törökszentmiklósi	1,862	5082
Tiszaug	V	Bács-Kiskun	Kecskeméti	903	6064
Tiszaújváros	T	Borsod-Abaúj-Zemplén	Tiszaújvárosi	17,517	3580
Tiszavalk	V	Borsod-Abaúj-Zemplén	Mezocsáti	354	3464
Tiszavárkony	V	Jász-Nagykun-Szolnok	Szolnoki	1,759	5092
Tiszavasvári	T	Szabolcs-Szatmár-Bereg	Tiszavasvári	13,583	4440
Tiszavid	V	Szabolcs-Szatmár-Bereg	Vásárosnaményi	509	4832
Tisztaberek	V	Szabolcs-Szatmár-Bereg	Fehérgyarmati	665	4969
Tivadar	V	Szabolcs-Szatmár-Bereg	Vásárosnaményi	228	4921
Tóalmás	V	Pest	Nagykátai	3,370	2252
Tófalu	V	Heves	Füzesabonyi	1,448	3354
Tófej	V	Zala	Zalaegerszegi	710	8946
Tófű	V	Baranya	Komlói	127	7348
Tokaj	T	Borsod-Abaúj-Zemplén	Tokaji	5,009	3910
Tokod	V	Komárom-Esztergom	Dorogi	4,317	2531
Tokodaltáró	V	Komárom-Esztergom	Dorogi	3,134	2532
Tokorcs	V	Tolna	Celldömölki	297	9561
Tolcsva	V	Borsod-Abaúj-Zemplén	Sárospataki	1,997	3934
Told	V	Hajdú-Bihar	Berettyóújfalui	387	4117
Tolmács	V	Nógrád	Rétsági	758	2657
Tolna	T	Tolna	Szekszárdi	12,184	7130
Tolnanémedi	V	Tolna	Tamási	1,263	7083
Tomajmonostora	V	Jász-Nagykun-Szolnok	Tiszafüredi	769	5324
Tomor	V	Borsod-Abaúj-Zemplén	Edelényi	279	3787
Tompa	V	Bács-Kiskun	Kiskunhalasi	4,892	6422
Tompaládony	V	Tolna	Csepregi	334	9662
Tordas	V	Fejér	Ercsi	1,764	2463
Tormafölde	V	Zala	Lenti	425	8876
Tormás	V	Baranya	Sásdi	344	7383
Tormásliget	V	Tolna	Csepregi	357	9736
Tornabarakony	V	Borsod-Abaúj-Zemplén	Edelényi	30	3765
Tornakápolna	V	Borsod-Abaúj-Zemplén	Edelényi	15	3761
Tornanádaska	V	Borsod-Abaúj-Zemplén	Edelényi	603	3767
Tornaszentandrás	V	Borsod-Abaúj-Zemplén	Edelényi	273	3765
Tornaszentjakab	V	Borsod-Abaúj-Zemplén	Edelényi	260	3769
Tornyiszentmiklós	V	Zala	Lenti	697	8877
Tornyosnémeti	V	Borsod-Abaúj-Zemplén	Abaúj–Hegyközi	604	3877
Tornyospálca	V	Szabolcs-Szatmár-Bereg	Kisvárdai	2,707	4642
Torony	V	Tolna	Szombathelyi	1,604	9791
Torvaj	V	Somogy	Tabi	317	8660
Tószeg	V	Jász-Nagykun-Szolnok	Szolnoki	4,714	5091
Tótkomlós	T	Békés	Orosházi	6,615	5940
Tótszentgyörgy	V	Baranya	Szigetvári	182	7981
Tótszentmárton	V	Zala	Letenyei	922	8865
Tótszerdahely	V	Zala	Letenyei	1,304	8864
Tótújfalu	V	Somogy	Barcsi	247	7918
Tótvázsony	V	Veszprém	Veszprémi	1,175	8246
Tök	V	Pest	Pilisvörösvári	1,329	2073
Tököl	T	Pest	Ráckevei	9,056	2316
Töltéstava	V	Gyor-Moson-Sopron	Gyori	1,879	9086
Tömörd	V	Tolna	Csepregi	281	9738
Tömörkény	V	Csongrád	Csongrádi	1,969	6646
Törökbálint	T	Pest	Budaörsi	11,798	2045
Törökkoppány	V	Somogy	Tabi	491	7285
Törökszentmiklós	T	Jász-Nagykun-Szolnok	Törökszentmiklósi	22,962	5200
Törtel	V	Pest	Ceglédi	4,546	2747
Töttös	V	Baranya	Mohácsi	618	7755
Trizs	V	Borsod-Abaúj-Zemplén	Kazincbarcikai	278	3724
Tunyogmatolcs	V	Szabolcs-Szatmár-Bereg	Fehérgyarmati	2,636	4731
Tura	T	Pest	Aszódi	8,001	2194
Túristvándi	V	Szabolcs-Szatmár-Bereg	Fehérgyarmati	771	4944
Túrkeve	T	Jász-Nagykun-Szolnok	Mezotúri	10,047	5420
Túrony	V	Baranya	Siklósi	271	7811
Túrricse	V	Szabolcs-Szatmár-Bereg	Fehérgyarmati	674	4968
Tuzsér	V	Szabolcs-Szatmár-Bereg	Kisvárdai	3,373	4623
Türje	V	Zala	Zalaszentgróti	1,912	8796
Tüskevár	V	Veszprém	Ajkai	570	8477
Tyukod	V	Szabolcs-Szatmár-Bereg	Csengeri	2,142	4762

== Notes ==
- Cities marked with * have several different post codes, the one here is only the most general one.
