= Mezőcsát =

- Town
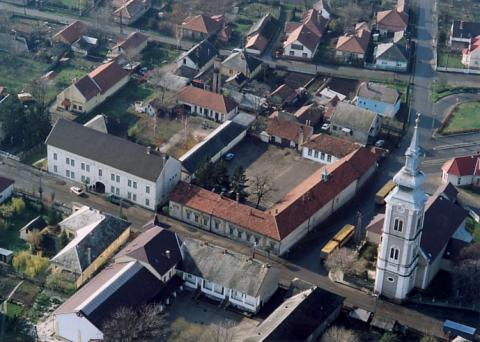
- Aerial view

- Flag Coat of arms

- Location within Hungary
- Coordinates: 47°49′N 20°54′E
- Country: Hungary
- County: Borsod-Abaúj-Zemplén
- District: Mezőcsát

Area
  - Total: 103.07 km^{2} (39.80 sq mi)

Population (2015)
  - Total: 5,882
  - Density: 57.07/km^{2} (147.8/sq mi)
- Time zone: UTC+1 (CET)
  - Summer (DST): UTC+2 (CEST)
- Postal code: 3450
- Area code: (+36) 49
- Website: www.mezocsat.hu

Mezőcsát is a small town in Borsod-Abaúj-Zemplén county, Northern Hungary, 35 kilometers from county capital Miskolc.

== History ==
The area has been inhabited since ancient times. A necropolis from the Bronze Age was excavated from 1958 until 1962 and contains 40 burials. In 1067 a monastery was founded here. At this time the village was called Csát and it had two separate parts: Szabadcsát, where freemen lived, and Lakcsát where serfs lived.

During the Mongol invasion of Hungary Mezőcsát was destroyed. It was mentioned again only in the 1330s. After the battle of Mezőkeresztes it was abandoned again, but people settled in the area once more when Borsod comitatus was ruled from Transylvania under Ruling Prince Gábor Bethlen. In 1686 the Imperial forces burnt Mezőcsát down, but in a document from 1698 it is mentioned as a town with right to hold a market, so it must have been a significant town then. The inhabitants took part in the revolution against the Habsburgs in 1848–49, and the imperial forces burnt the village again.

After 1867 Mezőcsát prospered, the railway line reached the village; mills were built and banks were opened.

In World War I, Mezőcsát lost 176 of its residents. The monument on Heroes Square, the main square of Mezőcsát, was erected to their memory. During World War II the Jewish inhabitants were deported. On 7 November 1944, the Soviet army occupied the village.

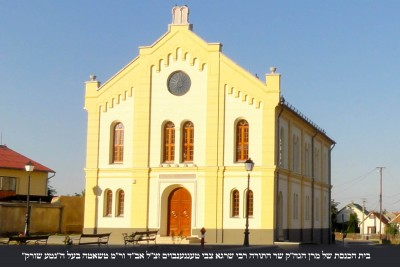
Jewish synagogue in mezőcsát

During the next few decades Mezőcsát prospered, even though its role as centre of the area was taken over by the newly built town of Tiszaújváros. On 1 January 1991, Mezőcsát regained its town status.

=== Jewish history of Mezőcsat ===
==== Jewish community ====
Jews began settling in Mezőcsát (then part of the Kingdom of Hungary) during the second half of the 18th century. The Jewish community was officially organized in the early 19th century . The community included eight surrounding villages: Tiszadorogma, Tiszakeszi, Tiszatarján, Igrici, Hejőpapi, Emőd, Nemesbikk, and Hejőbába.

The original synagogue was destroyed in a fire. In 1880 (Hebrew year 5640 – תר"מ), a new synagogue was constructed, which still stands today. A Talmud Torah was established in 1878 (תרל"ח), and the town's yeshiva was founded by Rabbi Yaakov Tannenbaum leter Chief rabbi of Putnok ("Nehar Efarsemon"). Leadership later passed to his brother Rabbi Shraga Tzvi Tannenbaum ("Neteh Sorek") and continued through future generations.

==== Rabbis of Mezőcsát ====
- Rabbi Eliezer Spitz – Served as Av Beit Din (Chief Rabbi) of Mezőcsát from 1810 (תק"ע) to 1840 (ת"ר).
- Rabbi Menachem Bleier – Son-in-law of R. Spitz; author of Kavod HaLevanon. Succeeded his father-in-law for 2 years, then served as rabbi in Paraszló, and later in Eger. Died on Shavuot 1890 (תר"נ).
- Rabbi Aharon Fried – Disciple of the Chatam Sofer. Served briefly in Mezőcsát in 1843 (תר"ג) but left after his house burned down. Later became rabbi of Beszterec. Author of Omer LaTziyon, She’elot u-Teshuvot Mahara"f, Zeken Aharon, and more. He was a son-in-law of the author of Shemen Rokeach.
- Rabbi Yosef Reis (Reisz) – Disciple of the Chatam Sofer. Previously rabbi in Lik, he served in Mezőcsát from around 1847 (תר"ז) until his death on 8 Iyar 1865 (תרכ"ה). Buried in Mezőcsát.
- Rabbi Menachem Levi Stein – Later moved to Berlin. Many of his Torah insights were published in Tel Talpiyot, Yagdil Torah, Veyilket Yosef, and others.
- Rabbi Yaakov Tannenbaum – Author of Nehar Efarsemon. Served as rabbi from 1869 (תרכ"ט) to 1873 (תרל"ג), then accepted a position in Putnok.
- Rabbi Shraga Tzvi / Fabian Tannenbaum – Older brother of Rabbi Yaakov, author of Neta Sorek. Served from 1874 (תרל"ד) until his death on 4 Adar 1897 (תרנ"ז).
- Rabbi Yehuda Altman – Son-in-law of Rabbi Shraga Tzvi; author of Yam Shel Yehuda and others. Served from 1897 (תרנ"ז) until his death on 3 Iyar 1923 (תרפ"ג).
- Rabbi Shraga Tzvi Altman – Son of Rabbi Yehuda Altman; author of Ataret Tzvi. Appointed in 1923 at the age of 24. Martyred in the Holocaust on 24 Sivan 1944 (תש"ד).

==== After the Holocaust ====
Following the Holocaust, about 80 Jews returned to Mezőcsát and reestablished the community under the leadership of the shochet Rabbi Eliyahu Alter Rosenfeld. However, after the Hungarian Revolution of 1956, most Jews fled due to fears of communist oppression. By 1960 (תש"ך), only around nine families remained.

In 1988 (תשמ"ח), a new yeshiva named Neta Sorek Mezőcsát was founded in Kiryas Joel, New York, led by Rabbi Meir Yehuda Tannenbaum, a grandson of Rabbi Shraga Tzvi ("Neta Sorek"). He also established the Neta Sorek de'Tshateh community, including a mikveh, in Kiryas Joel.

==== Works by Mezőcsát Rabbis ====
- Nehar Efarsemon – R. Yaakov Tannenbaum
- Neta Sorek – R. Shraga Tzvi Tannenbaum
- Yam Shel Yehuda – R. Yehuda Altman
- Ataret Tzvi – R. Shraga Tzvi Altman
- Omer LaTziyon, Mahara"f Responsa, Zeken Aharon – R. Aharon Fried
- Kavod HaLevanon – R. Menachem Bleier

And more

== See also ==
- History of the Jews in Hungary
- Chatam Sofer
- Kiryas Joel

== Tourist sights ==
- Manor of the Dobozy family
