= Mezőcsát District =

Mezőcsát District Mezőcsáti járás
- Districts of Hungary
- Coat of arms

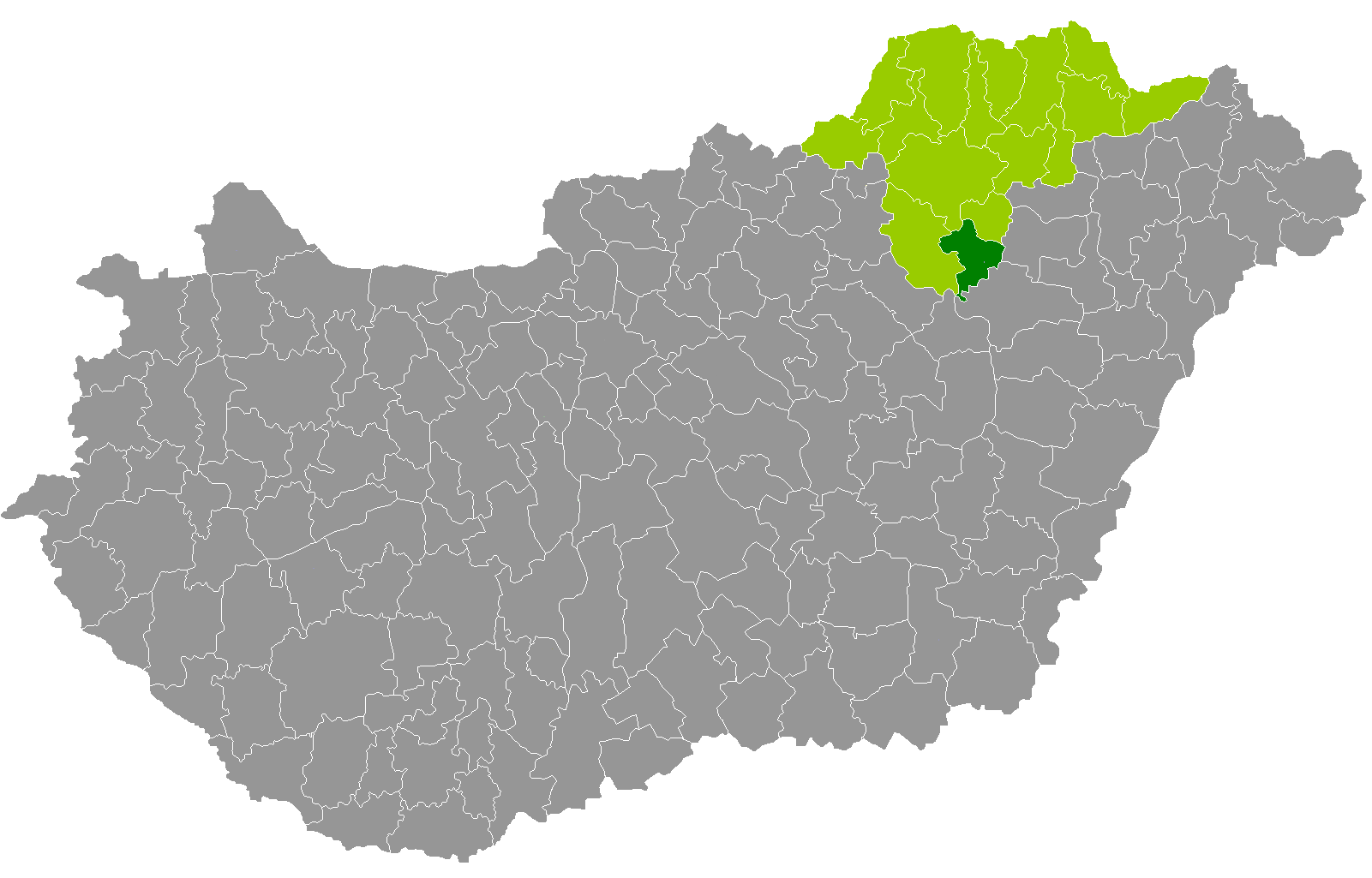
- Mezőcsát District within Hungary and Borsod-Abaúj-Zemplén County.
- Coordinates: 47.82°N 20.90°E
- Country: Hungary
- County: Borsod-Abaúj-Zemplén
- District seat: Mezőcsát

Area
  - Total: 351.27 km^{2} (135.63 sq mi)
  - Rank: 11th in Borsod-Abaúj-Zemplén

Population (2011 census)
  - Total: 14,446
  - Rank: 15th in Borsod-Abaúj-Zemplén
  - Density: 41/km^{2} (110/sq mi)

Mezőcsát (Hungarian: Mezőcsáti járás) is a district in southern part of Borsod-Abaúj-Zemplén County. Mezőcsát is also the name of the town where the district seat is found. The district is located in the Northern Hungary Statistical Region.

== Geography ==
Mezőcsát District borders with Miskolc District and Tiszaújváros District to the north, Hajdúnánás District and Balmazújváros District (Hajdú-Bihar County) to the east and south, Mezőkövesd District to the west. The number of the inhabited places in Mezőcsát District is 8.

== Municipalities ==
The district has 1 town and 7 villages. (ordered by population, as of 1 January 2012)

- Ároktő (1,051)
- Gelej (588)
- Hejőpapi (1,119)
- Igrici (1,219)
- **Mezőcsát** (5,891) – district seat
- Tiszadorogma (367)
- Tiszakeszi (2,487)
- Tiszatarján (1,408)

The bolded municipality is the city.

== Demographics ==
Religion in Mezőcsát District (2011 census)
1. Calvinism (43.2%)
2. Catholic Church (25.1%)
3. Greek Catholicism (1.00%)
4. Other religions (1.40%)
5. Non-religious (9.70%)
6. Atheists (0.30%)
7. Undeclared (19.3%)

In 2011, it had a population of 14,446 and the population density was 41/km².

Year	County population	Change
2011	14,446	n/a

=== Ethnicity ===
Besides the Hungarian majority, the main minority is the Roma (approx. 1,500).

Total population (2011 census): 14,446
Ethnic groups (2011 census): Identified themselves: 14,393 persons:

- Hungarians: 12,884 (89.52%)
- Gypsies: 1,376 (9.56%)
- Others and indefinable: 133 (0.92%)

Approx. 50 persons in Mezőcsát District did not declare their ethnic group at the 2011 census.

=== Religion ===
Religious adherence in the county according to 2011 census:

- Reformed – 6,239;
- Catholic – 3,764 (Roman Catholic – 3,625; Greek Catholic – 139);
- other religions – 211;
- Non-religious – 1,396;
- Atheism – 53;
- Undeclared – 2,783.

== Gallery ==
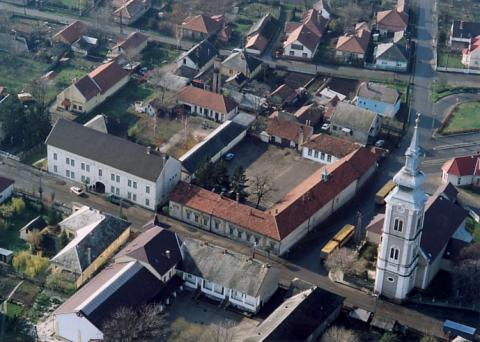
Mezőcsát, the district seat

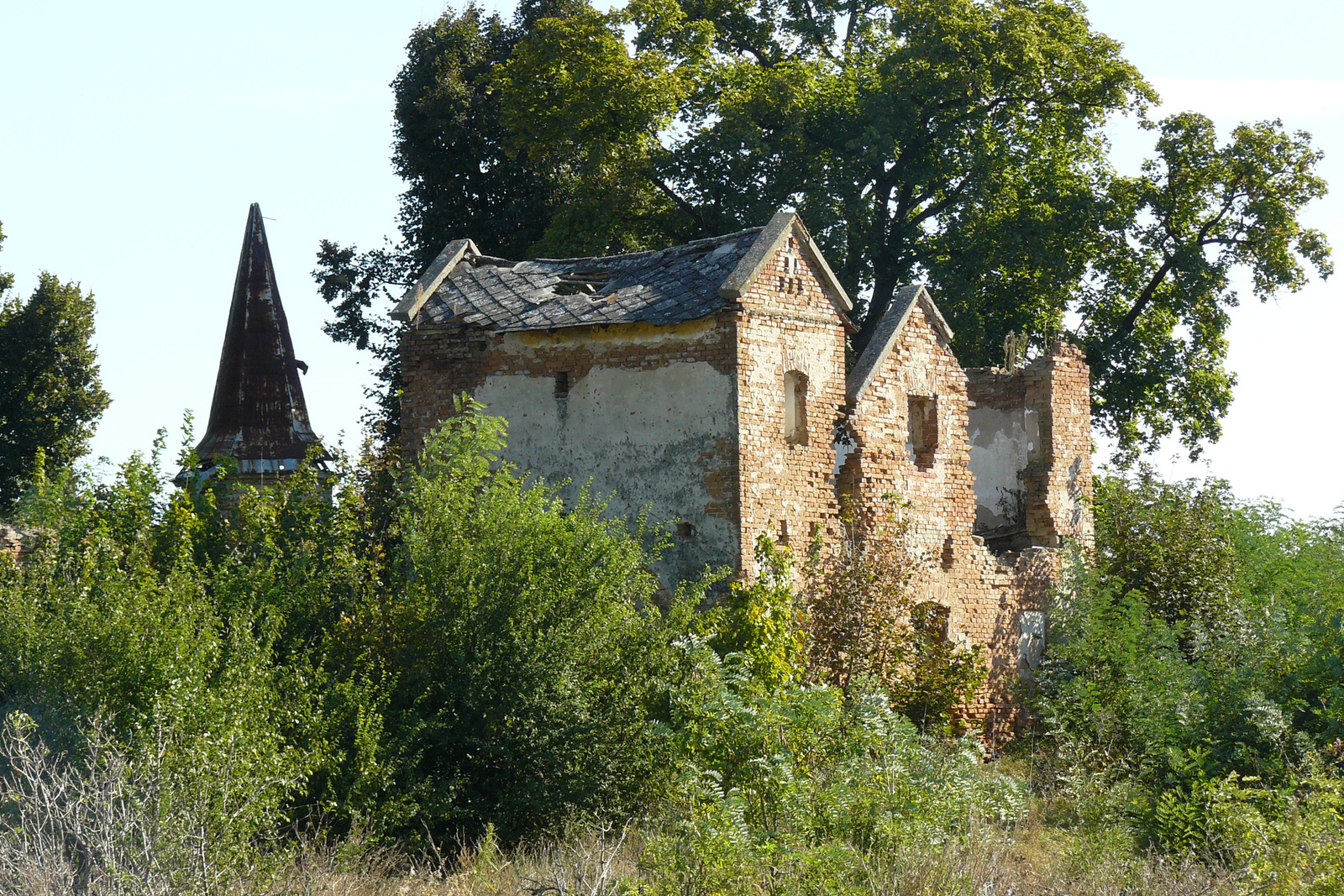
Dobozy Mansion in Mezőcsát

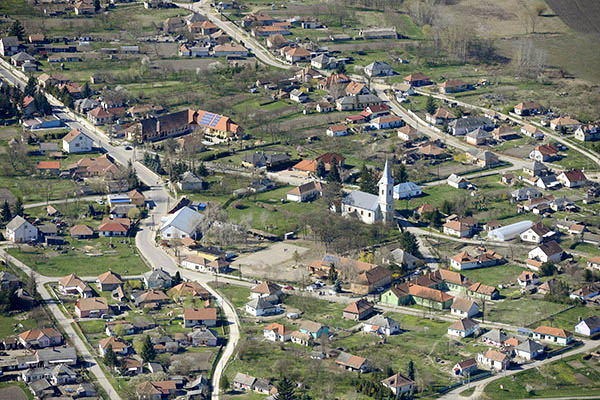
Aerial view of Tiszatarján

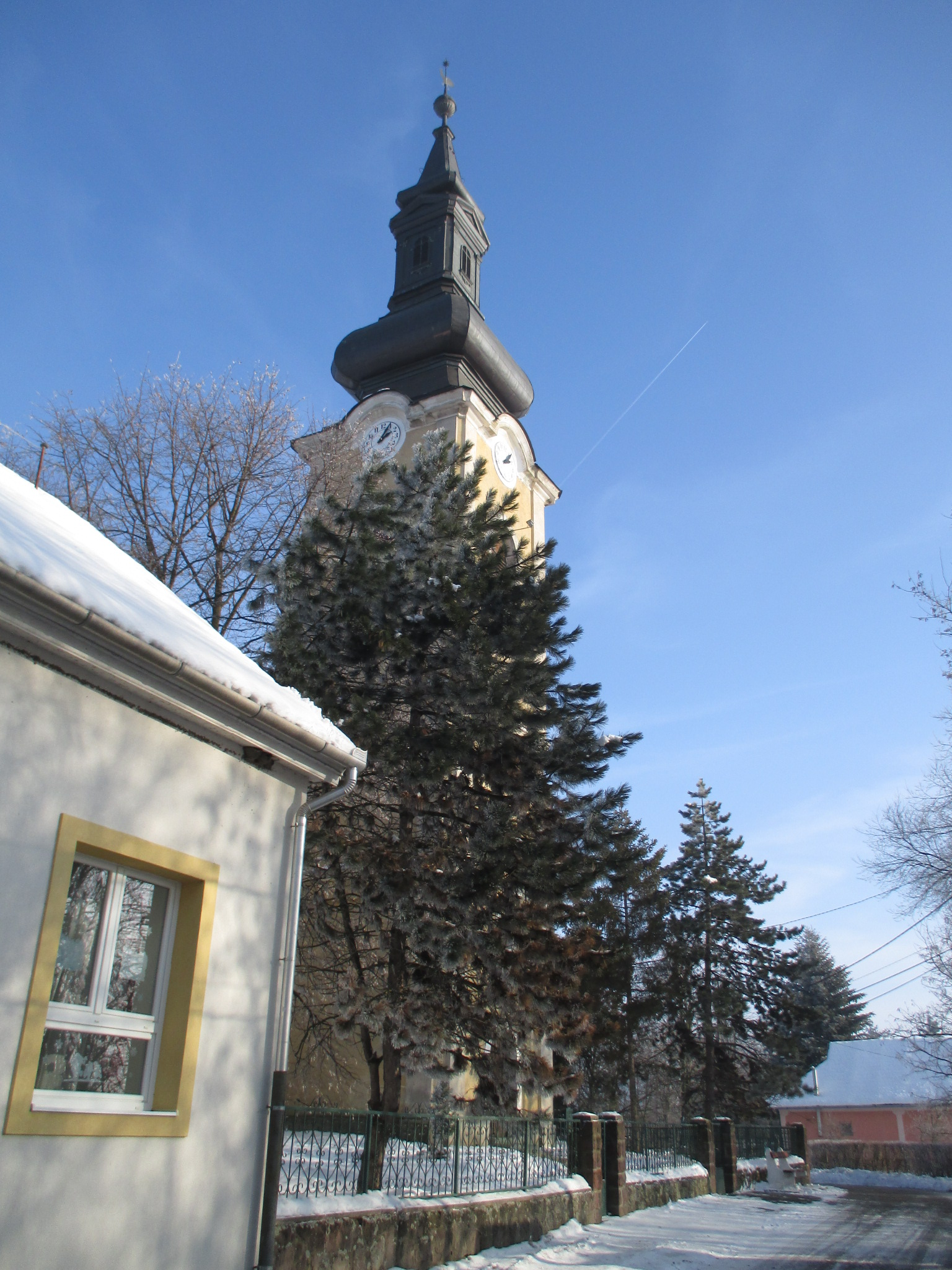
Reformed Church in Gelej

== See also ==
- List of cities and towns of Hungary
