= Kunhegyes District =

Coordinates: 47.370326818490526°N 20.630975066122662°E

Kunhegyes District Kunhegyesi járás
- Districts of Hungary
- Coat of arms

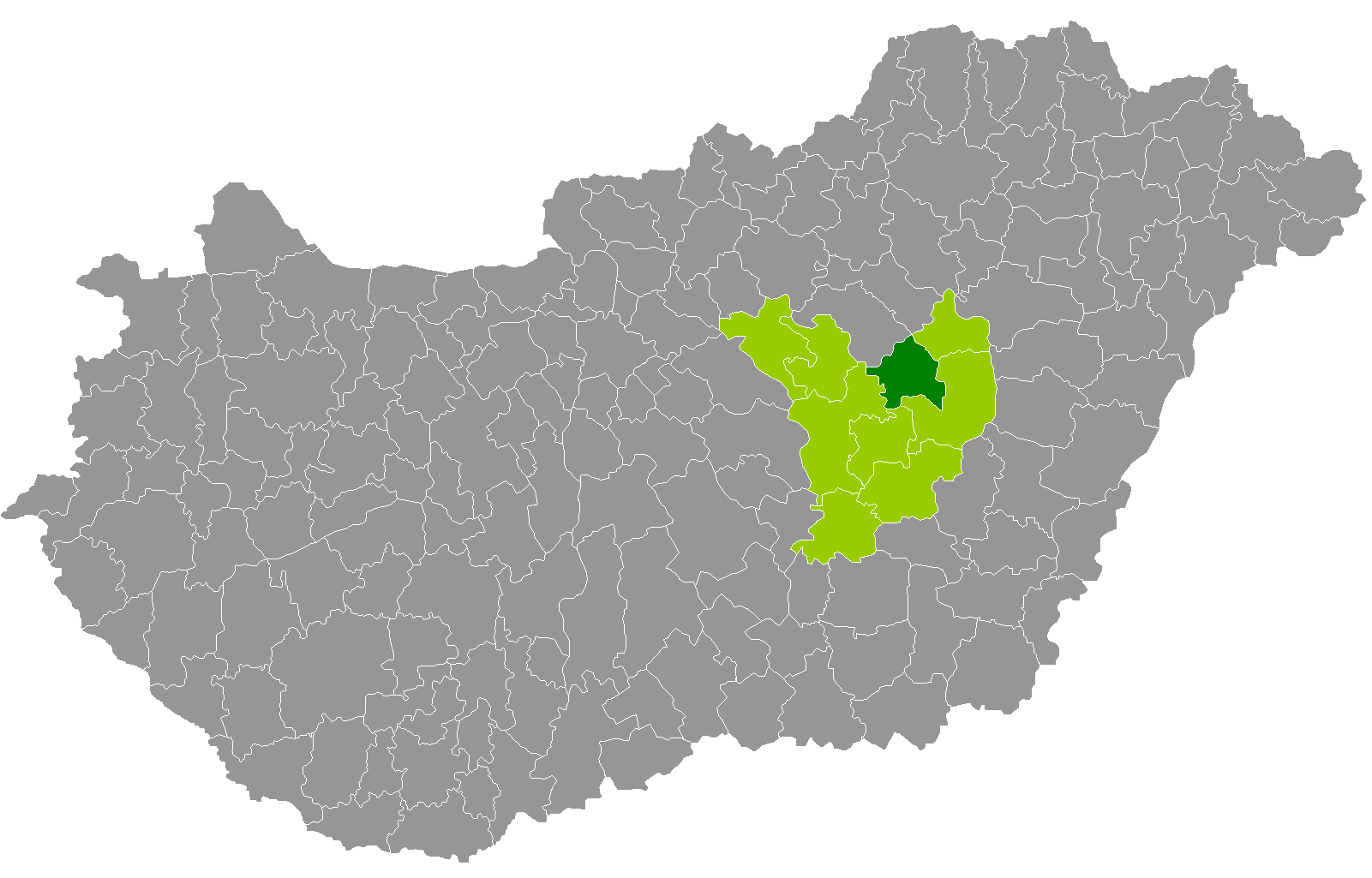
- Kunhegyes District within Hungary and Jász-Nagykun-Szolnok County.
- Country: Hungary
- County: Jász-Nagykun-Szolnok
- District seat: Kunhegyes

Area
  - Total: 464.58 km^{2} (179.38 sq mi)
  - Rank: 7th in Jász-Nagykun-Szolnok

Population (2011 census)
  - Total: 20,045
  - Rank: 8th in Jász-Nagykun-Szolnok
  - Density: 43/km^{2} (110/sq mi)

Kunhegyes (Hungarian: Kunhegyesi járás) is a district in north-eastern part of Jász-Nagykun-Szolnok County. Kunhegyes is also the name of the town where the district seat is found. The district is located in the Northern Great Plain Statistical Region. This district is a part of Nagykunság historical and geographical region.

== Geography ==
Kunhegyes District borders with Heves District (Heves County) to the northwest, Tiszafüred District to the northeast, Karcag District to the east and south, Törökszentmiklós District to the south, Szolnok District to the west. The number of the inhabited places in Kunhegyes District is 7.

== Municipalities ==
The district has 2 towns and 5 villages. (ordered by population, as of 1 January 2012)

- **Abádszalók** (3,922)
- **Kunhegyes** (7,483) – district seat
- Tiszabura (2,925)
- Tiszabő (1,862)
- Tiszagyenda (936)
- Tiszaroff (1,520)
- Tomajmonostora (704)

The bolded municipalities are cities.

== Demographics ==
Religion in Kunhegyes District (2011 census)
1. Catholic Church (23.5%)
2. Greek Catholicism (0.20%)
3. Calvinism (20.0%)
4. Lutheranism (0.10%)
5. Other religions (0.90%)
6. Non-religious (37.4%)
7. Atheists (0.50%)
8. Undeclared (17.4%)

In 2011, it had a population of 20,045 and the population density was 43/km².

Year	County population	Change
2011	20,045	n/a

=== Ethnicity ===
Besides the Hungarian majority, the main minority is the Roma (approx. 4,000).

Total population (2011 census): 20,045
Ethnic groups (2011 census): Identified themselves: 21,823 persons:

- Hungarians: 18,049 (82.71%)
- Gypsies: 3,595 (16.47%)
- Others and indefinable: 179 (0.82%)

Approx. 2,000 persons in Kunhegyes District did declare more than one ethnic group at the 2011 census.

=== Religion ===
Religious adherence in the county according to 2011 census:

- Catholic – 4,742 (Roman Catholic – 4,712; Greek Catholic – 30);
- Reformed – 4,010;
- Evangelical – 19;
- other religions – 189;
- Non-religious – 7,496;
- Atheism – 106;
- Undeclared – 3,483.

== Transport ==
=== Road network ===
- Main road (N→S): Tiszafüred... – **Kunhegyes District** (1 municipality: Kunhegyes) – ...Fegyvernek

=== Railway network ===
- Line 102 (N→S): Kál-Kápolna (80, 84)... –**Kunhegyes District** (2 municipalities: Abádszalók, Kunhegyes) – ...Kisújszállás (100)

== Gallery ==
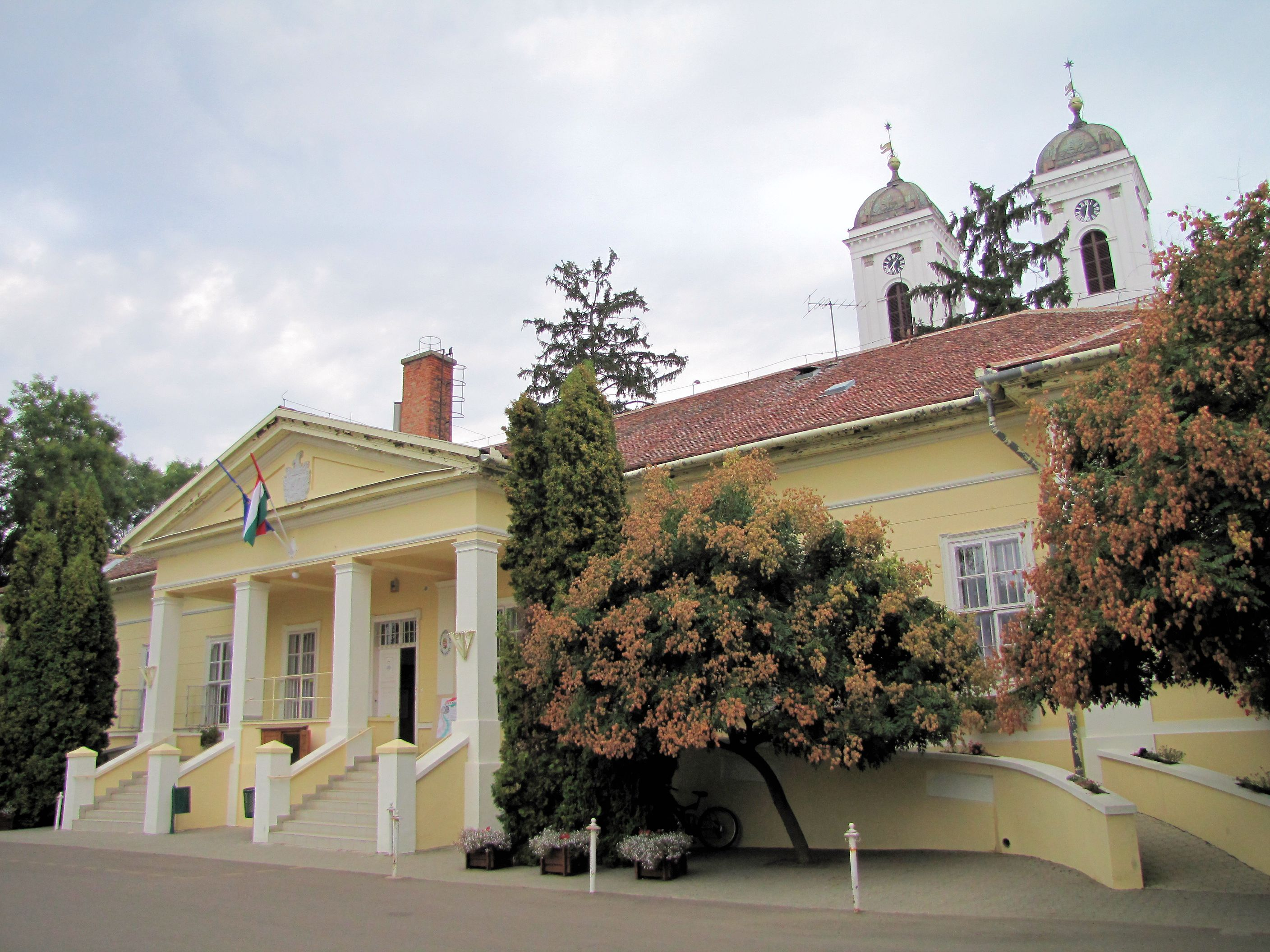
Kunhegyes, Town Hall

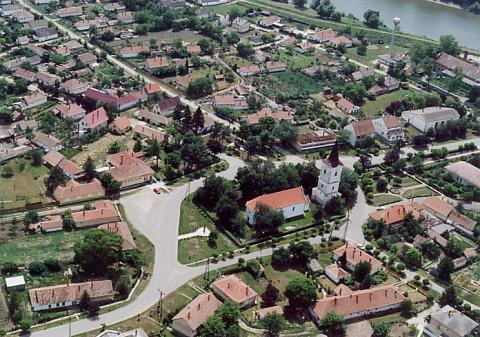
Aerial view of Tiszaroff

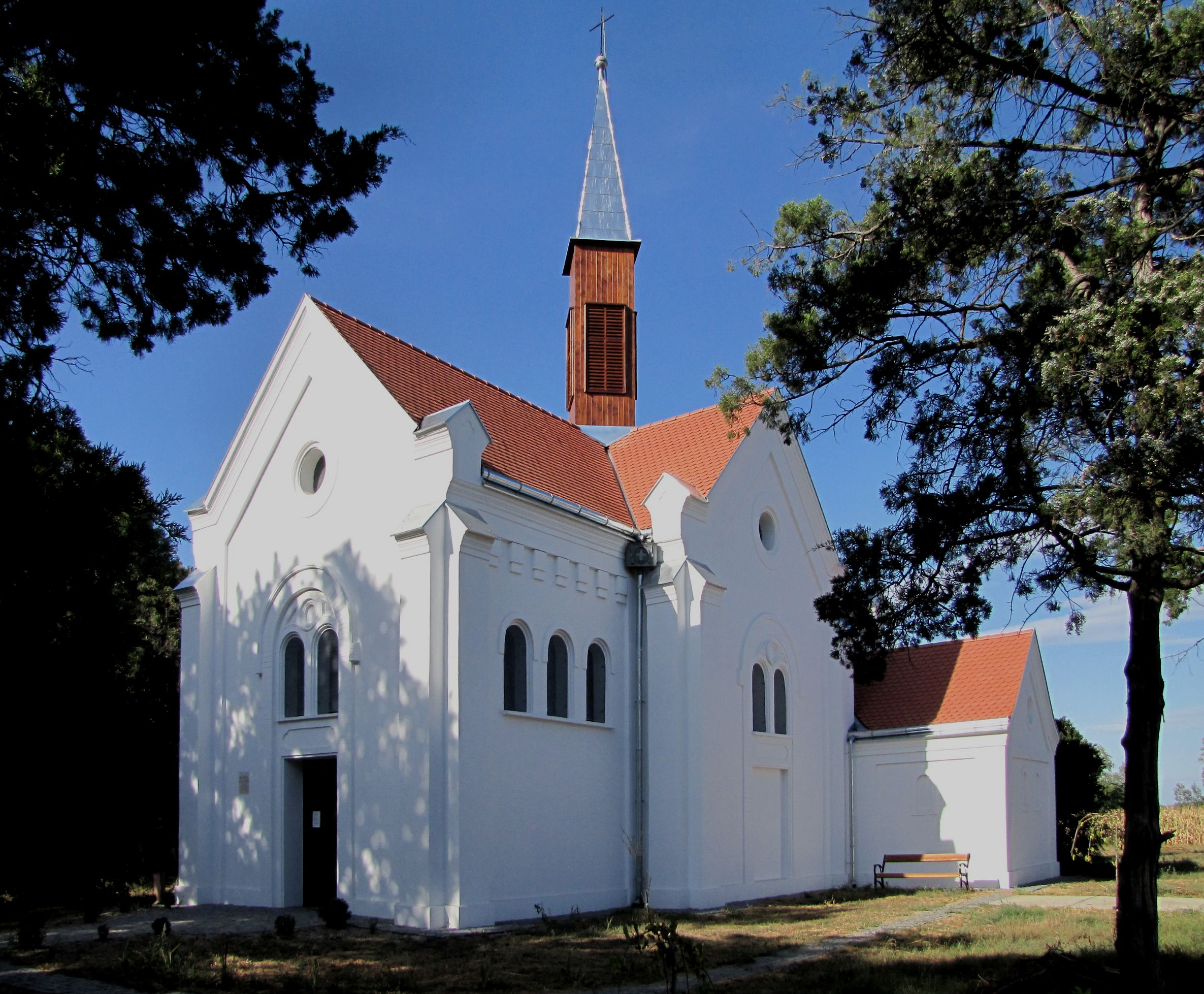
Szapáry Chapel in Tiszabura

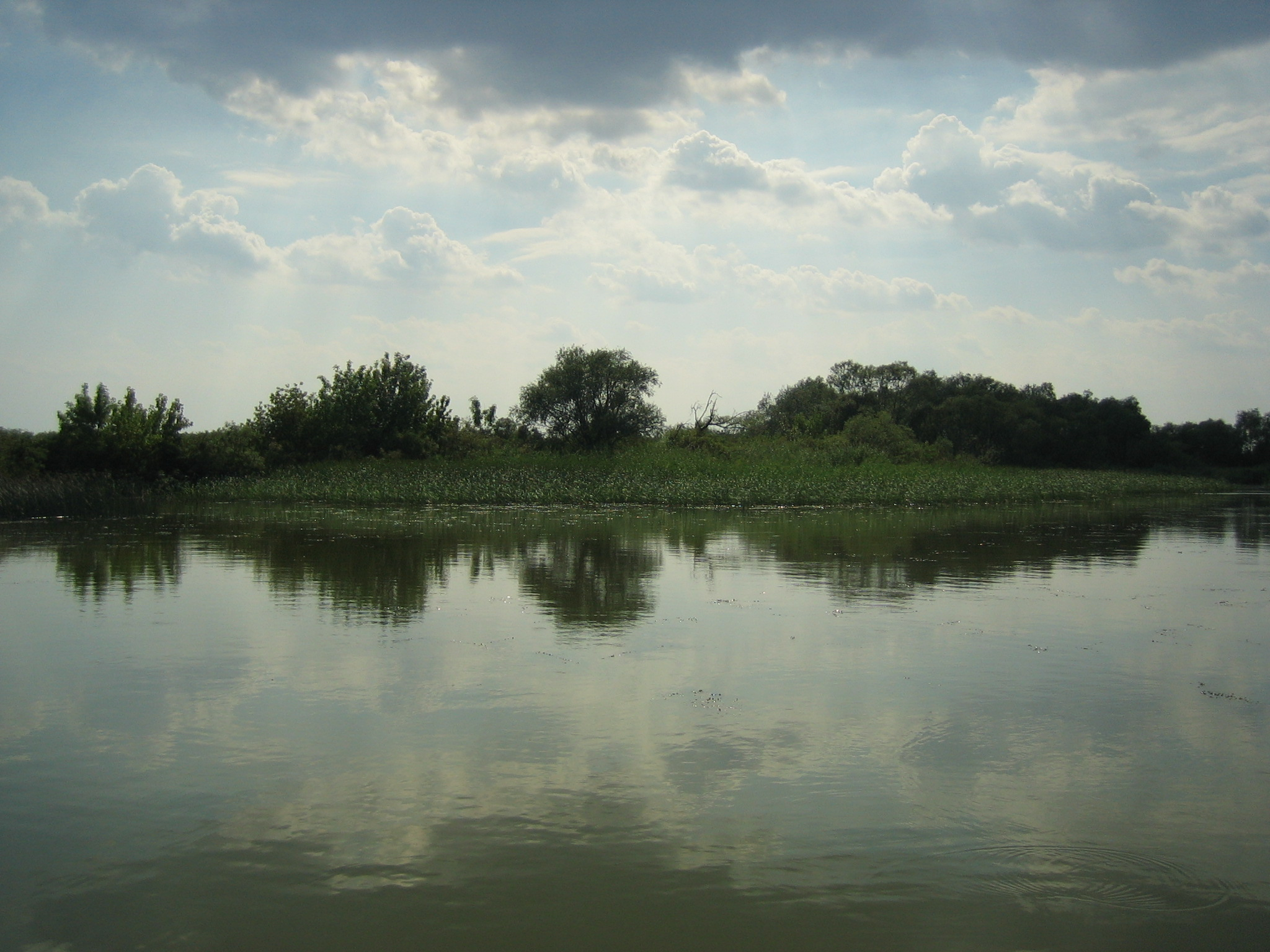
Lake Tisza

== See also ==
- List of cities and towns of Hungary
