= Tiszapüspöki =

- Village
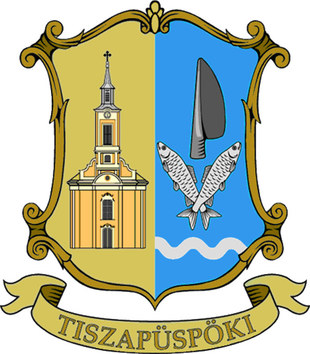
- Coat of arms

- Location within Hungary
- Coordinates: 47°13′N 20°19′E
- Country: Hungary
- County: Jász-Nagykun-Szolnok
- District: Törökszentmiklós

Area
  - Total: 37.45 km^{2} (14.46 sq mi)

Population (2024)
  - Total: 2,000
  - Density: 54.45/km^{2} (141.0/sq mi)
- Time zone: UTC+1 (CET)
  - Summer (DST): UTC+2 (CEST)
- Postal code: 5211
- Area code(s): (+36) 56

Tiszapüspöki is a village in Jász-Nagykun-Szolnok county's Törökszentmiklós District, in the Northern Great Plain region of central Hungary. It is an agricultural village.

== Geography ==
Tiszapüspöki is on the left bank of the Tisza, in the neighbourhood of Szajol, 8 km northwest of Törökszentmiklós. It covers an area of 37.45 km^{2} (14 sq mi) and has a population of 2000 people (2024).

== Access ==
The settlement is easily accessible even from more distant parts of the country because the junction of Main Road 4, the M4 motorway, and Main Road 46 is located at its southern border. However, regarding its built-up area, the village can be considered a cul-de-sac, as it can only be reached by a paved road from one direction—via secondary road number 32 127 starting from the aforementioned junction.

== History ==
Tiszapüspöki and the surrounding areas have been inhabited since ancient times. Pottery shards suggest that the area was once home to the thriving Körös culture. From later periods, we have artifacts including a Sarmatian mound vessel, a bowl, and additional pottery fragments. A cemetery from the time of the Hungarian conquest also yielded items such as a silver ring.

The first written mention of the place dates back to 1009, during the establishment of the Diocese of Eger. Later, a document from King Béla IV in 1261 confirms the diocese's land grant, referring to it as Pispuky.

The 16th century marked a flourishing period for the settlement, which began maintaining parish records from 1622 and constructed a new chapel in 1643. The name of Tiszapüspöki village is recorded in Székely-Hungarian runes.

Between 1692 and 1699, it was recorded as a deserted settlement, a wasteland. After 1718, settlers arrived from Jászság, Eger, and Galicia. The first "craftsmen" appeared, including water millers, brickmakers, and cobblers.

In 1804, it was transferred to the ownership of the Chapter of Szatmár. Between 1851 and 1932, the regulation of the Tisza River took place near Tiszapüspöki.

== Public life ==
=== Mayors ===
- 1990–1994: Sándor Tótok (Independent)
- 1994–1998: Sándor Tótok (Independent)
- 1998–2002: Sándor Tótok (Independent)
- 2002–2006: István Polgár (MSZP)
- 2006–2010: István Polgár (MSZP)
- 2010–2014: István Polgár (Independent)
- 2014–2019: József Bander (Independent)
- 2019–2024: József Bander (Independent)
- 2024– : József Bander (Independent)

== Ethnic groups and religious distribution ==
In 2001, 93% of the population in the settlement identified as Hungarian and 7% as Roma. At the same time, 58.7% of the population were Roman Catholic, 5.8% Calvinist, 0.4% Lutheran, and 0.3% Greek Catholic; 0.5% belonged to other denominations or religious groups, and 16.1% did not belong to any church or denomination. 18.1% were unknown or did not respond.

According to the 2011 census, the settlement had a population of 2,133, of which 85% identified as Hungarian and 15% as Roma. In terms of religious beliefs, 36% of the residents were Roman Catholic, 4% Calvinist, 1% belonged to other religions or denominations, and the remaining 59% were non-religious or did not respond to the question.

In 2022, 90.1% of the population identified as Hungarian, 15.3% as Roma, 0.3% as Ukrainian, 0.3% as German, 0.1% each as Greek, Slovenian, Serbian, and Romanian, and 1% as other non-native nationalities (9.8% did not declare; due to dual identities, the total may exceed 100%). Regarding their religion, 17.6% were Roman Catholic, 3.6% Calvinist, 0.7% Greek Catholic, 0.2% Jewish, 0.1% Lutheran, 0.7% other Christian, 0.4% other Catholic, and 23.7% non-denominational (52.9% did not respond).

== Economy ==
=== Agriculture ===
The prosperity of the Village's residents has always been connected to agriculture. Following the dissolution of the former Tiszatáj Cooperative (which had a machine workshop converted into a mill, but is now non-operational), the Aranykorona Agricultural Cooperative was established. It operates as a joint stock company, primarily focusing on the cultivation of cereals.

Previously, animal husbandry was significant, but its importance has diminished over time, and now only smaller amounts of cattle, pig, and poultry farming are practiced by the locals.

=== Industry ===
The first craftsmen appeared in Tiszapüspöki in the 16th century. They produced cloth, softened raw hides, and fired bricks. In addition to them, cobblers (shoemakers) and other small-scale artisans operated in the settlement.

Today, only a few people make a living as entrepreneurs in the industry: locksmiths, carpenters, haulers, and hairdressers.

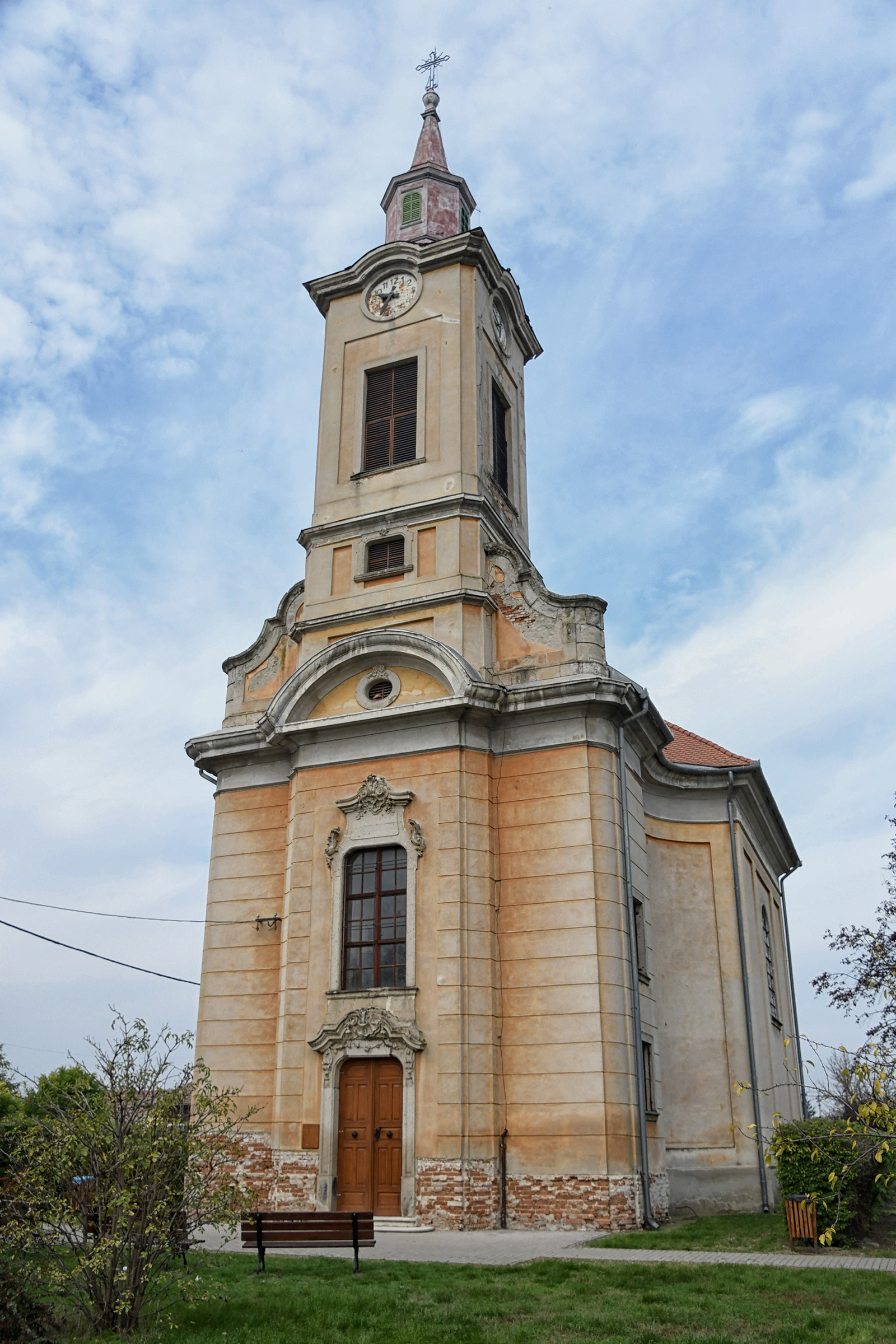
Roman Catholic church of Tiszapüspöki

== Landmarks ==
- A Baroque-style Catholic church built between 1765 and 1769. The pews inside the church were made in the 19th century in the Neoclassical style.
- The rectory was built by Károly Eszterházy, the Bishop of Eger.
- In the square in front of the church, there are monuments commemorating the First and Second World Wars, as well as a statue of Saint John of Nepomuk.
- The village day is held annually in July.
- On November 11, the significant event is the Martinmas fair.

Tiszapüspöki is a resort village ideal for anglers.

== Famous people from Tiszapüspöki ==
- János Garics, an actor, was born here.
- István Magyar, a footballer, was born here.
- Ferenc Szécsi, a poet and translator, was born here.

== Picture gallery ==
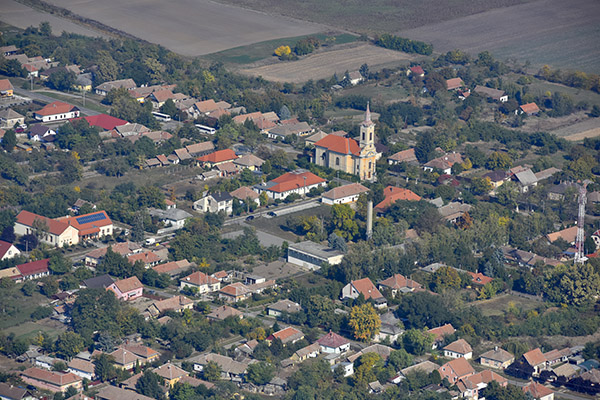
Tiszapüspöki church from aerial view

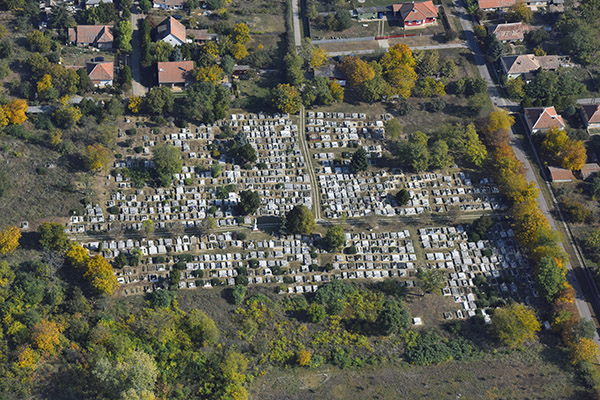
Tiszapüspöki cemetery

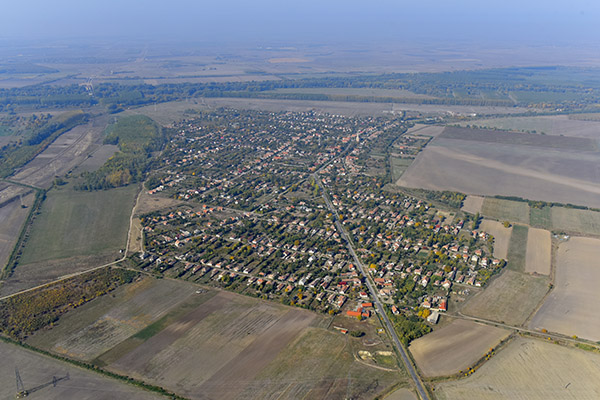
Tiszapüspöki from aerial view

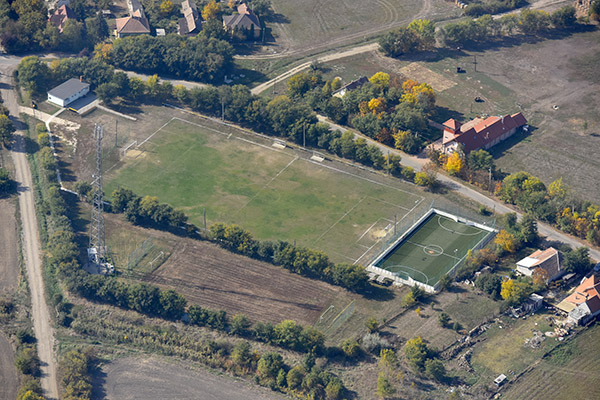
Tiszapüspöki football field
