= Kunhegyes =

- Town
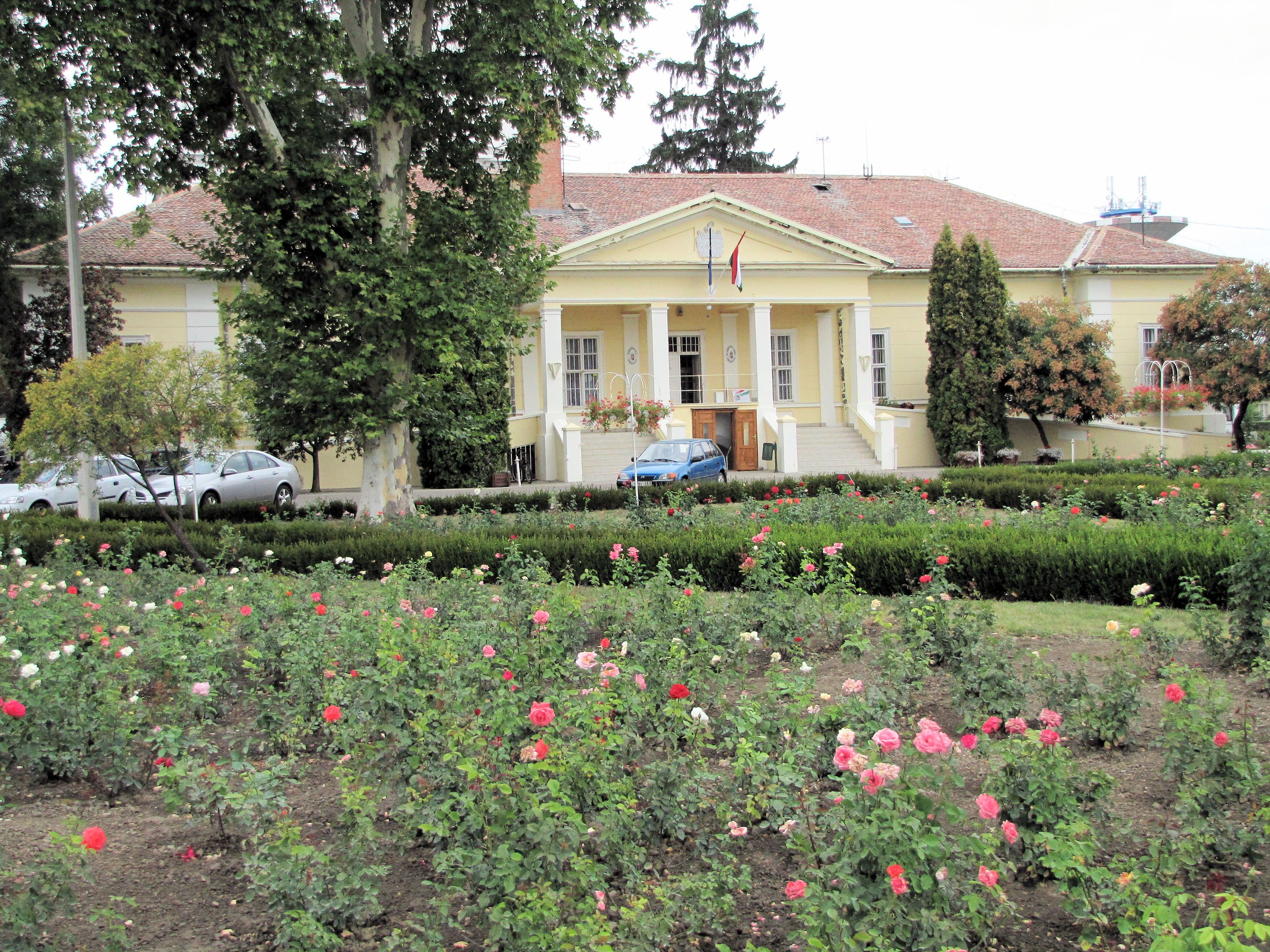
- Town hall

- Flag Coat of arms

- Location of Kunhegyes
- Coordinates: 47°22′13″N 20°37′51″E
- Country: Hungary
- County: Jász-Nagykun-Szolnok
- District: Kunhegyes

Area
  - Total: 148.94 km^{2} (57.51 sq mi)

Population (2018)
  - Total: 7,521
  - Density: 57.7/km^{2} (149/sq mi)
- Time zone: UTC+1 (CET)
  - Summer (DST): UTC+2 (CEST)
- Postal code: 5340
- Area code: (+36) 59
- Website: www.kunhegyes.hu

Kunhegyes is a town in northeast Jász-Nagykun-Szolnok, which is situated in Hungary.

== Twin towns – sister cities ==
Kunhegyes is twinned with:

- Baia Sprie, Romania (2006)
- Feketić (Mali Iđoš), Serbia (1993)
- Szerzyny, Poland (2006)
