= Abádszalók =

- Town
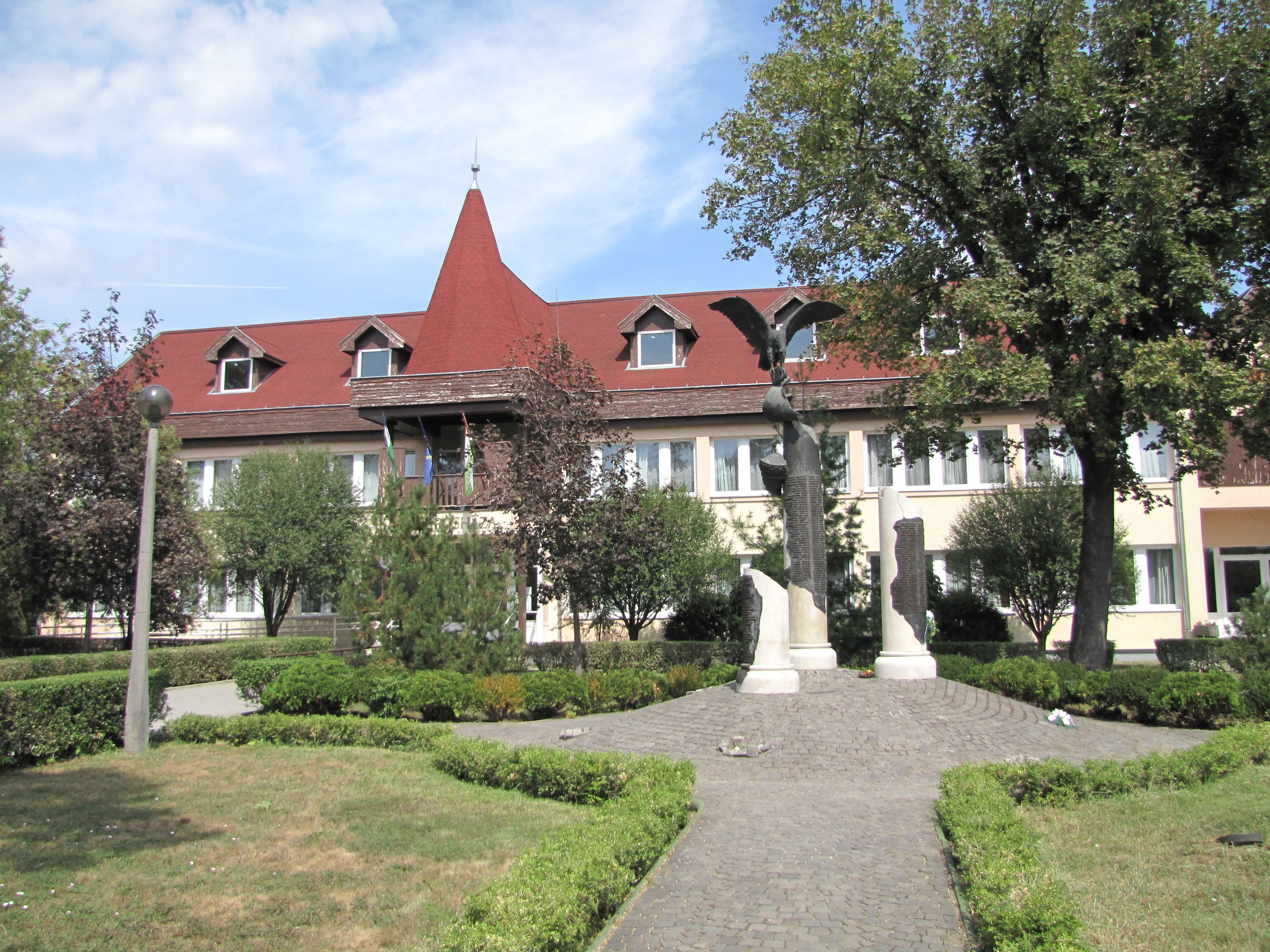
- Town hall

- Flag Coat of arms

- Location within Hungary
- Coordinates: 47°28′30″N 20°35′56″E
- Country: Hungary
- County: Jász-Nagykun-Szolnok
- District: Kunhegyes

Area
  - Total: 132.23 km^{2} (51.05 sq mi)

Population (2015)
  - Total: 4,279
  - Density: 32.36/km^{2} (83.81/sq mi)
- Time zone: UTC+1 (CET)
  - Summer (DST): UTC+2 (CEST)
- Postal code: 5241
- Area code: (+36) 59
- Website: www.abadszalok.hu

Abádszalók (Hungarian pronunciation: [ˈɒbaːt͡sːɒloːk]) is a town in Jász-Nagykun-Szolnok county, in the Northern Great Plain region of central Hungary. The town was established in 1895 by the union of the villages of Tiszabad and Tiszalok.

== Geography ==
It covers an area of 132.23 km^{2} (51 sq mi) and has a population of 4,279 people (2015).

== Name ==
The name of the town comes from the Aba and Szalók personal names. The first one is of Turkic origin with the suffix -d, while the second one is disputed. It may come from the proto-Slavic name *Ѕlavъкъ (cf. Czech Slávek) or from the Chagatai solaq, meaning "left-handed". It has been attested in 1093 as Zoliok and in 1287 as Zolok.

== History ==
=== The Jewish community ===
Jews settled in the city in the 19th century. And in 1880 there were 112 Jews in the community. In 1920, the city's Jews were victims of a pogrom. In 1940, only 18 Jewish families lived there. In March 1944, the Jews were concentrated in the Szolnok ghetto and from there most of them were sent to the Auschwitz extermination camp.

== Tourism ==
- Lake Tisza

The biggest tourist attraction in Abádszalók is the Lake Tisza. Water-skiing, boating, and kayaking as well as discos and concerts are available. Lake Tisza has waterfowls, water fauna and aquatic activities.

== International relations ==
Abádszalók is twinned with:

- Păsăreni (Backamadaras), Romania; since 2006
- Rzepiennik Strzyżewski, Poland; since 1999

== See also ==
- Tonuzoba
