= Kuncsorba =

- Village
- Coat of arms

- Location within Hungary
- Coordinates: 47°08′N 20°34′E
- Country: Hungary
- County: Jász-Nagykun-Szolnok
- District: Törökszentmiklós

Area
  - Total: 33.63 km^{2} (12.98 sq mi)

Population (2015)
  - Total: 621
  - Density: 18.5/km^{2} (48/sq mi)
- Time zone: UTC+1 (CET)
  - Summer (DST): UTC+2 (CEST)
- Postal code: 5412
- Area code(s): (+36) 56

Kuncsorba is a village in Jász-Nagykun-Szolnok county, in the Northern Great Plain region of central Hungary.

== Geography ==
It covers an area of 33.63 km^{2} (13 sq mi).

== Population ==
It has a population of 621 people (2015).
