= Ároktő =

- Coat of arms

- Location in Hungary
- Coordinates: 47.7308°N 20.9423°E
- Country: Hungary
- County: Borsod-Abaúj-Zemplén
- District: Mezőcsát

Government
  - Mayor: Vargáné Kerékgyártó Ildikó Anna (2014-2018)

Area
  - Total: 46.43 km^{2} (17.93 sq mi)

Population (2015)
  - Total: 1,116
  - Density: 26.16/km^{2} (67.8/sq mi)
- Time zone: UTC+1 (CET)
  - Summer (DST): UTC+2 (CEST)
- Postal code: 3467
- Area code: 49

Ároktő is a village in Borsod-Abaúj-Zemplén county, Hungary. The village is located on the banks of the Tisza river.
