= Törökszentmiklós District =

Coordinates: 47.1833°N 20.4500°E

Törökszentmiklós District Törökszentmiklósi járás
- Districts of Hungary
- Coat of arms

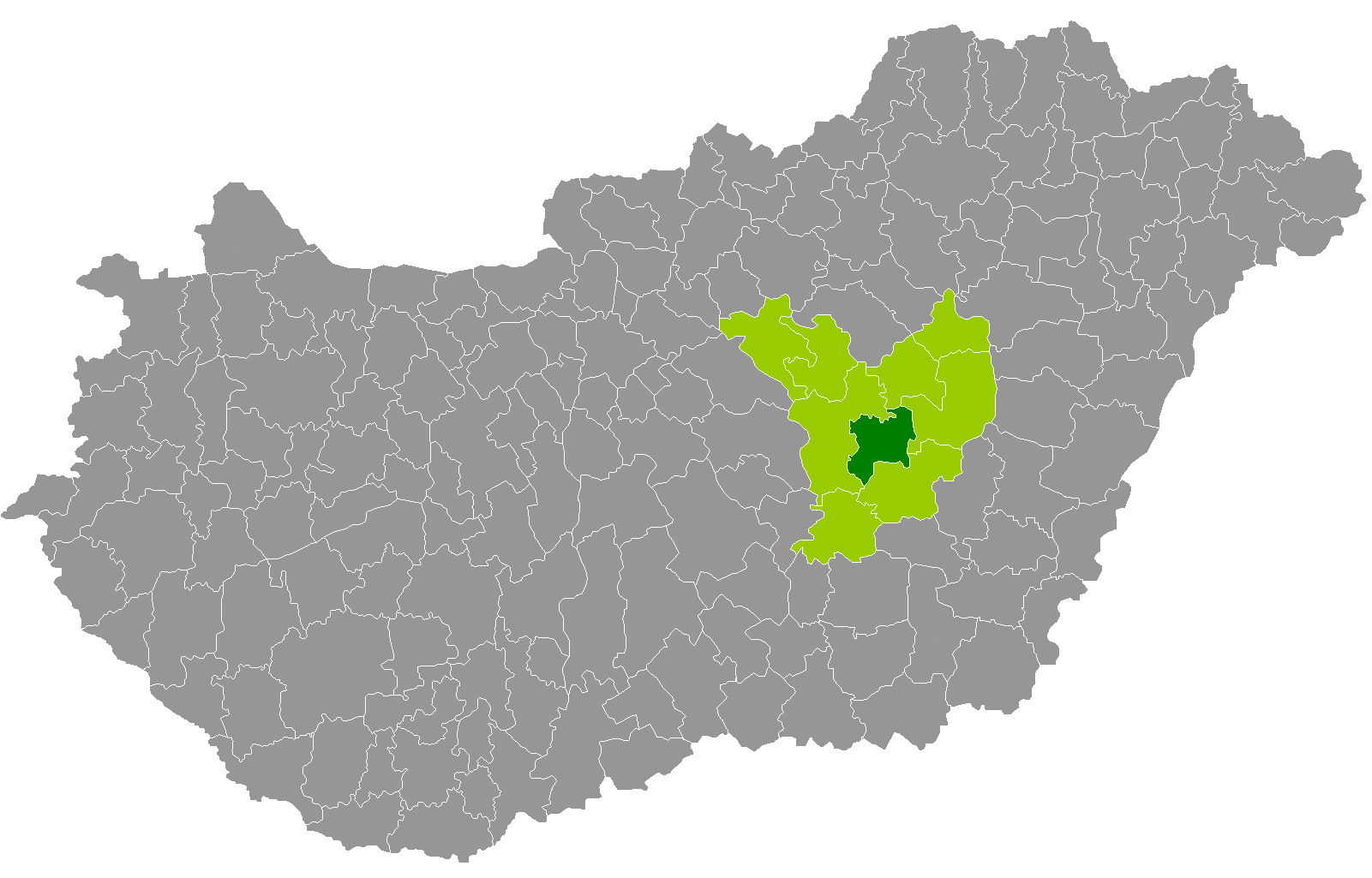
- Törökszentmiklós District within Hungary and Jász-Nagykun-Szolnok County.
- Country: Hungary
- County: Jász-Nagykun-Szolnok
- District seat: Törökszentmiklós

Area
  - Total: 464.54 km^{2} (179.36 sq mi)
  - Rank: 8th in Jász-Nagykun-Szolnok

Population (2011 census)
  - Total: 36,739
  - Rank: 4th in Jász-Nagykun-Szolnok
  - Density: 79/km^{2} (200/sq mi)

Törökszentmiklós (Hungarian: Törökszentmiklósi járás) is a district in central part of Jász-Nagykun-Szolnok County in Hungary. Törökszentmiklós is also the name of the town where the district seat is found. The district is located in the Northern Great Plain Statistical Region. This district is a part of Nagykunság historical and geographical region.

== Geography ==
Törökszentmiklós District borders with Kunhegyes District to the north, Karcag District to the east, Mezőtúr District to the southeast, Szolnok District to the west and north. The number of the inhabited places in Törökszentmiklós District is 7.

== Municipalities ==
The district has 2 towns and 5 villages. (ordered by population, as of 1 January 2012)

- Fegyvernek (6,415) (city)
- Kengyel (3,857)
- Kuncsorba (585)
- Örményes (1,049)
- Tiszapüspöki (2,005)
- Tiszatenyő (1,627)
- Törökszentmiklós (21,043) – (city, district seat)

== Demographics ==
Religion in Törökszentmiklós District (2011 census)
1. Catholic Church (29.0%)
2. Greek Catholicism (0.20%)
3. Calvinism (10.3%)
4. Lutheranism (0.10%)
5. Other religions (0.80%)
6. Non-religious (33.2%)
7. Atheists (0.80%)
8. Undeclared (25.6%)

In 2011, it had a population of 36,739 and the population density was 79/km^{2}.

Year	County population	Change
2011	36,739	n/a

=== Ethnicity ===
Besides the Hungarian majority, the main minorities are the Roma (approx. 1,500) and German (100).

Total population (2011 census): 36,739
Ethnic groups (2011 census): Identified themselves: 33,338 persons:

- Hungarians: 31,779 (95.32%)
- Gypsies: 1,208 (3.62%)
- Others and indefinable: 351 (1.05%)

Approx. 3,500 persons in Törökszentmiklós District did not declare their ethnic group at the 2011 census.

=== Religion ===
Religious adherence in the county according to 2011 census:

- Catholic – 10,728 (Roman Catholic – 10,655; Greek Catholic – 73);
- Reformed – 3,780;
- Evangelical – 49;
- other religions – 301;
- Non-religious – 12,179;
- Atheism – 310;
- Undeclared – 9,392.

== Gallery ==
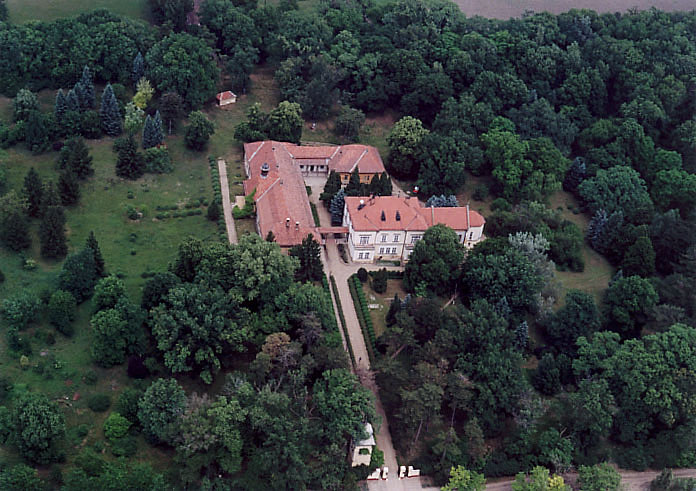
Almásy Mansion in Törökszentmiklós

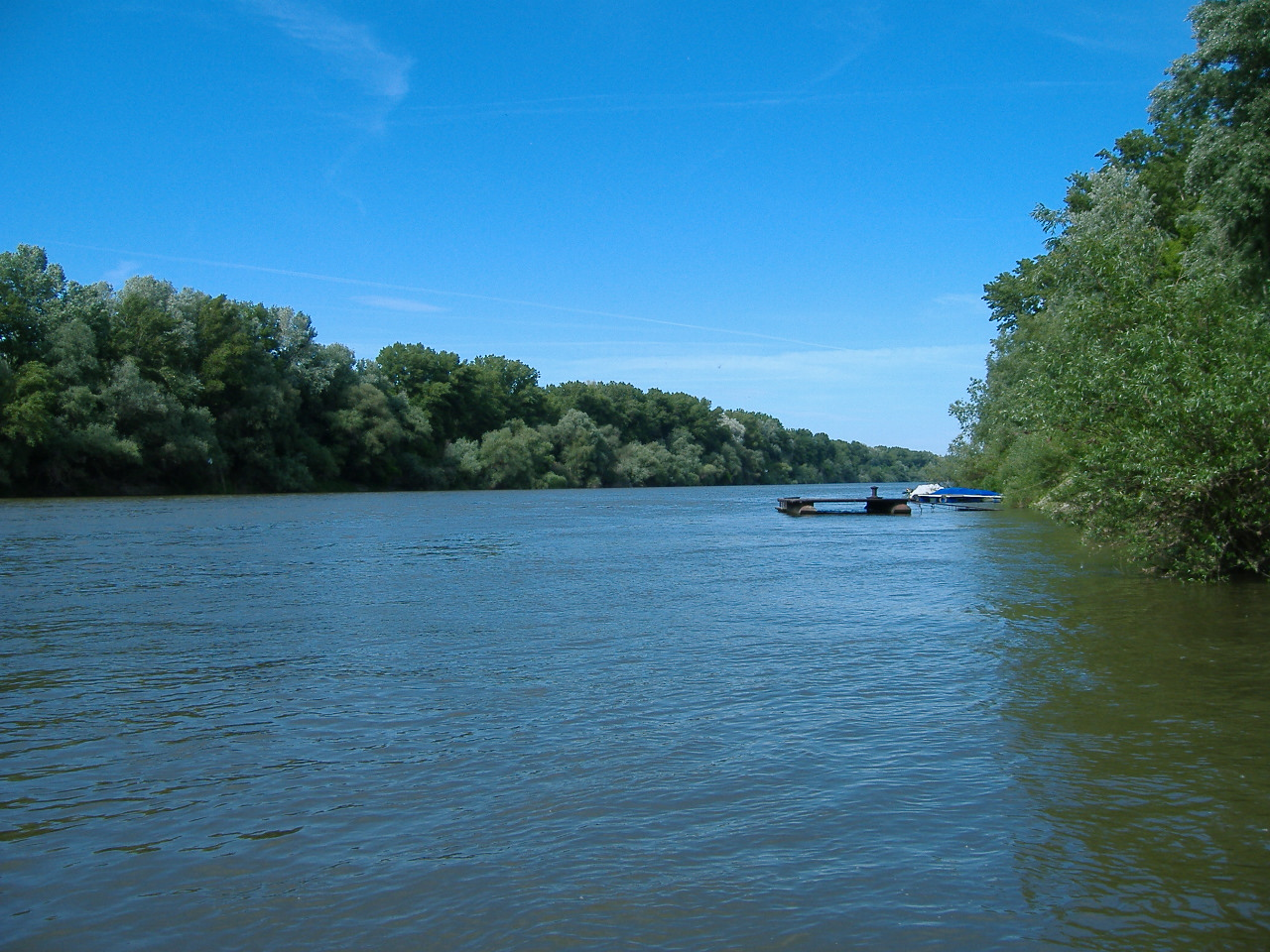
Tisza river near Tiszapüspöki

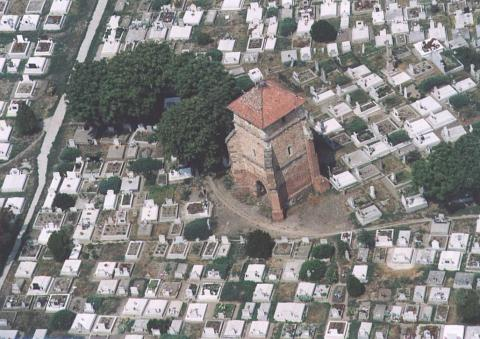
Puszatorony from above (Fegyvernek)

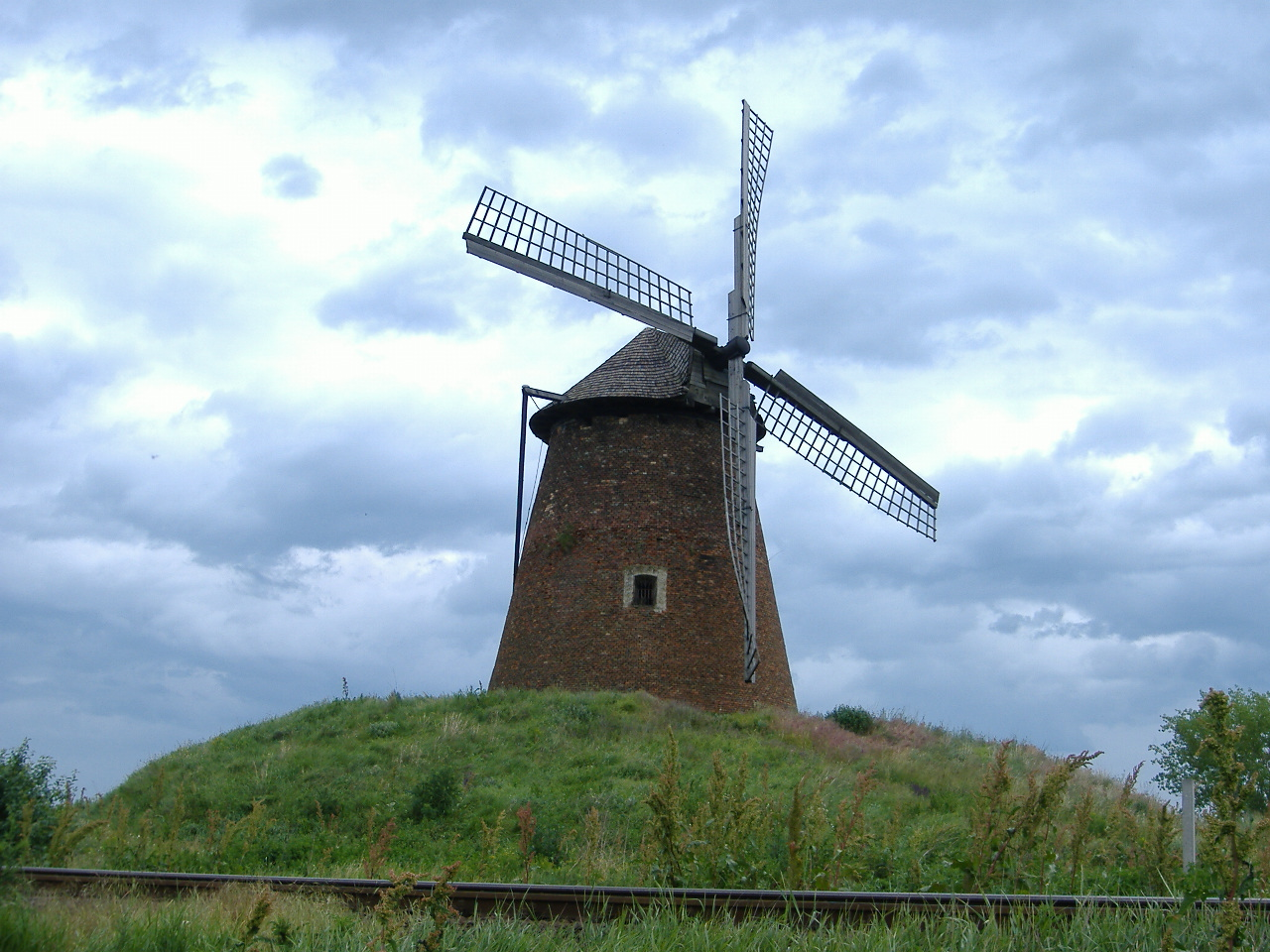
Windmill Hill near Kengyel

== See also ==
- List of cities and towns of Hungary
