= Örményes, Hungary =

Örményes
- Village
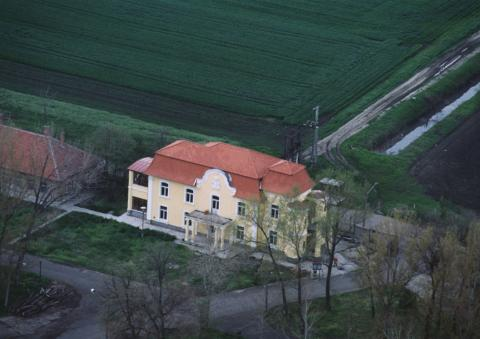
- Biró Castle in Örményes

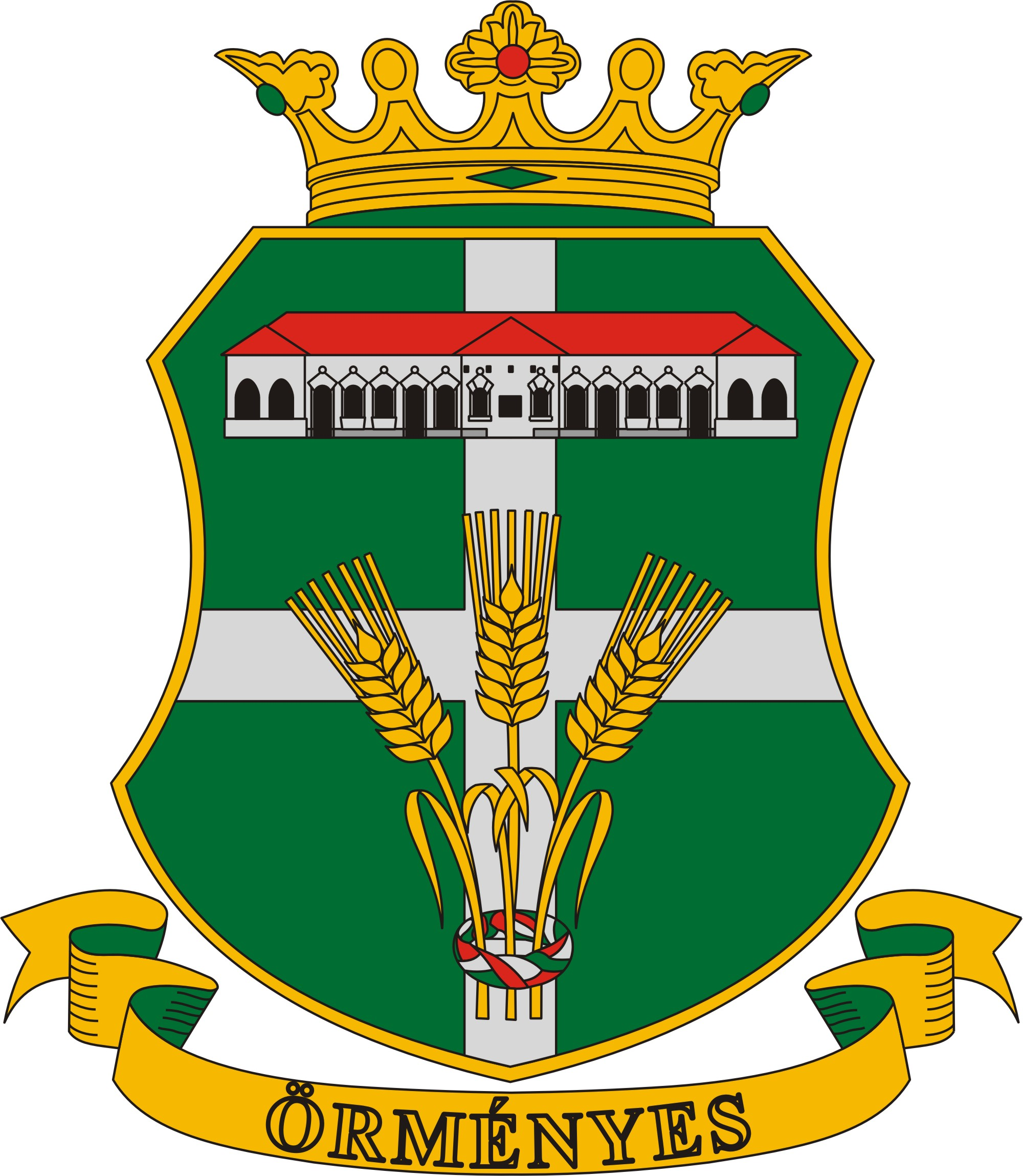
- Coat of arms

- Location within Hungary
- Coordinates: 47°11′31″N 20°34′38″E
- Country: Hungary
- County: Jász-Nagykun-Szolnok
- District: Törökszentmiklós

Area
  - Total: 34.13 km^{2} (13.18 sq mi)

Population (2025)
  - Total: 924
  - Density: 29.27/km^{2} (75.8/sq mi)
- Time zone: UTC+1 (CET)
  - Summer (DST): UTC+2 (CEST)
- Postal code: 5222
- Area code: (+36) 56
- Website: ormenyes.hu

Örményes is a village in Jász-Nagykun-Szolnok county, in the Northern Great Plain region of central Hungary.

As of 1 January 2025, it has a population of 924.
