= Gelej =

- Village
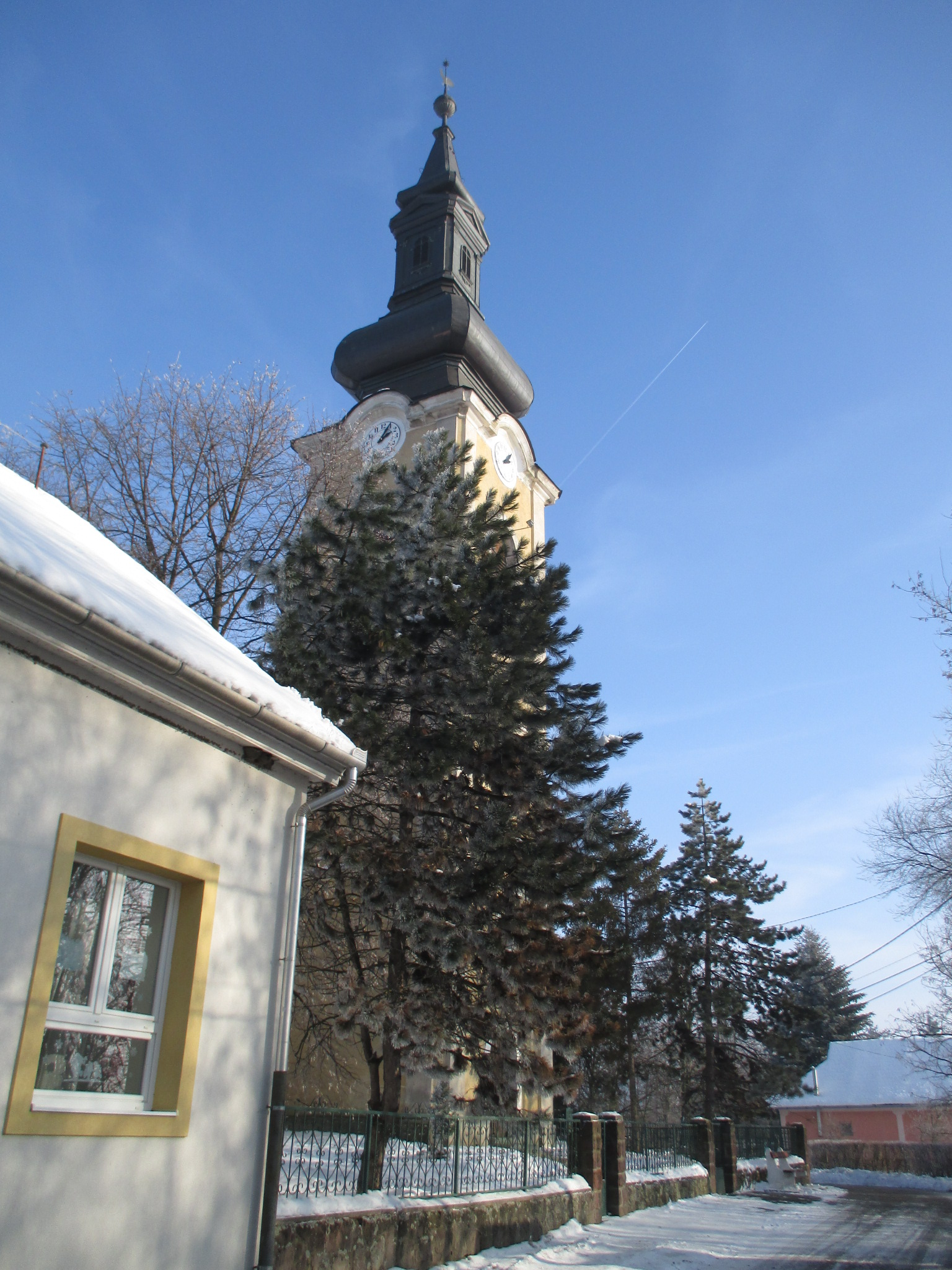

- Flag Coat of arms

- Location of Gelej
- Coordinates: 47.82895°N 20.77718°E
- Country: Hungary
- Region: Northern Hungary
- County: Borsod-Abaúj-Zemplén
- District: Mezőcsát

Area
  - Total: 32.1 km^{2} (12.4 sq mi)

Population (1 January 2025)
  - Total: 543
  - Density: 16.9/km^{2} (43.8/sq mi)
- Time zone: UTC+1 (CET)
  - Summer (DST): UTC+2 (CEST)
- Postal code: 3444
- Area code: (+36) 49
- Website: www.gelej.hu

Gelej is a village in Borsod-Abaúj-Zemplén county, Hungary.
