= Tonuzoba =

Tonuzoba or Tonuzaba (fl. c. 950) was a Pecheneg tribal chieftain who settled with his people in Hungary. He is the first known ancestor of the Tomaj, Szalók, Bő, and Örkény kindreds.

He was given lands from Taksony in the county of Heves. Györffy argues that he was related to the grand prince because Taksony's wife was of Pecheneg descent. According to legend, Tonuzoba was buried alive at Abádszalók because he refused to convert to Christianity.
