= Tiszaroff =

- Village
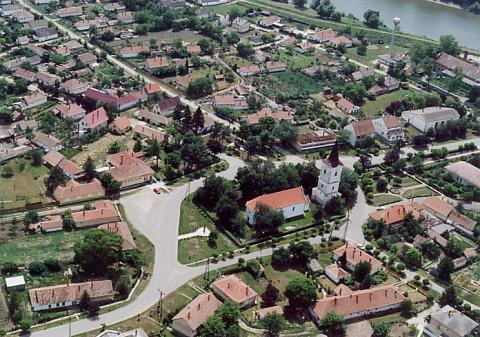
- Aerial view of Tiszaroff

- Coat of arms

- Location within Hungary
- Coordinates: 47°23′49″N 20°26′20″E
- Country: Hungary
- County: Jász-Nagykun-Szolnok
- District: Kunhegyes

Government
  - Mayor: Vankóné Jekli Anikó (Ind.)

Area
  - Total: 52.49 km^{2} (20.27 sq mi)
- Elevation: 86 m (282 ft)

Population (2022)
  - Total: 1,553
  - Density: 29.59/km^{2} (76.63/sq mi)
- Time zone: UTC+1 (CET)
  - Summer (DST): UTC+2 (CEST)
- Postal code: 5234
- Area code(s): (+36) 56

Tiszaroff is a village in Jász-Nagykun-Szolnok County, in the Northern Great Plain Region of Hungary.

== Geography ==
It covers an area of 52.49 km^{2} (20 sq mi) and has a population of 1,553 people (2022).

== History of the Tiszaroff Reformed Church ==
More than three hundred years ago Tiszaroff was located to the north, about 3 km (2 mi) from its present location. Its church building was made of "weaved rod and mud" called "patics" [potits]. It had been repaired in 1713. Because of the flood of the Tisza river the whole village had moved out to its present location. In 1726 Mihaly Borbely the new landlord gave to the Reformed Church the granary that had been built by the dynasty of Rakoczi to be as a chapel. Since that time it has been called "Rakoczi's bread house."

This chapel was restructured to church building in 1757 by making it higher by 1.5 meter (5 feet) and bigger to the East by 4.5 meters (15 feet); two small churchyards was built to it and on West side a choir was built, which is the "boys choir". The ceiling was a wooden painted panel ceiling. It can be still seen in the churchyards (now those are under renovation).

During the anti-reformation period the Protestants were not allowed to build towers to their church buildings, therefore the Tiszaroff Reformed Church got a permission to build only a "watchtower" near the church. So there is 6 meters (20 feet) distance between the tower and the church. It is said "The church is engaged with the tower."

Originally both buildings were shingled roof. In 1802 the first reconstruction work on the buildings began. In 1816 the painted wooden panel ceiling was replaced. In 1846 and 1878 they put a new shingled roof onto the buildings. In 1910 the shingled roofs were replaced by tin plate.

The last major reconstruction was in 1968.

The first church-clock was repaired in 1818, but it is not known when it was made. The present clock was made in 1894. It is famous for the functions of its hands are mixed up: the hour hand shows the minutes and minute hand shows the hours.

There are three bells in the tower.

The first organ was built in 1882 with its choir in the East side of the church. The present organ was built in 1941 by master John Barakovics from Budapest. Its style is late Baroque.
