= Tiszabő =

- Village
- Coat of arms

- Location within Hungary
- Coordinates: 47°18′29″N 20°29′13″E
- Country: Hungary
- County: Jász-Nagykun-Szolnok
- District: Kunhegyes

Area
  - Total: 35.04 km^{2} (13.53 sq mi)

Population (2015)
  - Total: 2,094
  - Density: 59.8/km^{2} (155/sq mi)
- Time zone: UTC+1 (CET)
  - Summer (DST): UTC+2 (CEST)
- Postal code: 5232
- Area code(s): (+36) 56

Tiszabő is a village in Jász-Nagykun-Szolnok county, in the Northern Great Plain region of central Hungary. It has the highest density of blood plasma donors in Hungary (6.2% of population).

== Geography ==
It covers an area of 35.04 km^{2} (14 sq mi) and has a population of 2094 people (2015).
