= Tiszagyenda =

- Village
- Coat of arms

- Location within Hungary
- Coordinates: 47°23′02″N 20°30′32″E
- Country: Hungary
- County: Jász-Nagykun-Szolnok
- District: Kunhegyes

Area
  - Total: 36.93 km^{2} (14.26 sq mi)

Population (2001)
  - Total: 1,077
  - Density: 29/km^{2} (75/sq mi)
- Time zone: UTC+1 (CET)
  - Summer (DST): UTC+2 (CEST)
- Postal code: 5233
- Area code(s): (+36) 56

Tiszagyenda is a village in Jász-Nagykun-Szolnok county, in the Northern Great Plain region of central Hungary.

== Etymology ==
Tiszagyans is first mentioned in 1302 as Qyanda. According to Lajos Kiss, it probably comes from Turkic *Vandi "the one who returned", and may have been a personal name.

== Geography ==
It covers an area of 36.93 km^{2} (14 sq mi) and has a population of 1077 people (2001).

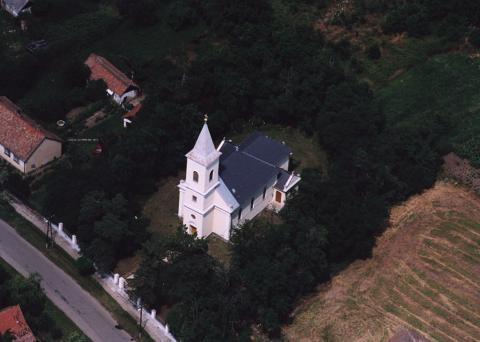
Tiszagyenda - church from above
