= Tiszabura =

- Village
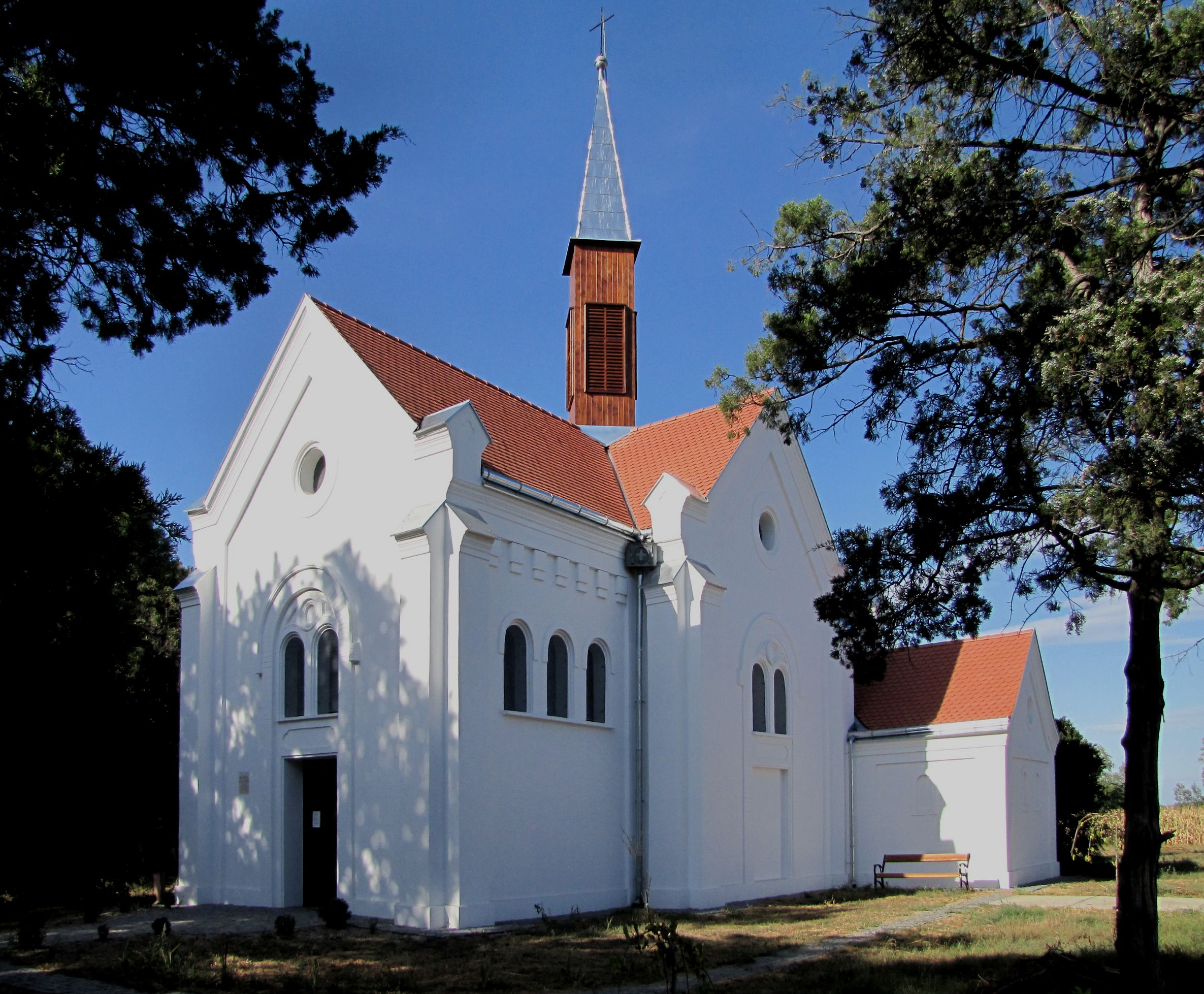
- Szapáry Chapel

- Coat of arms

- Location within Hungary
- Coordinates: 47°26′49″N 20°27′32″E
- Country: Hungary
- County: Jász-Nagykun-Szolnok
- District: Kunhegyes

Area
  - Total: 45.2 km^{2} (17.5 sq mi)

Population (2015)
  - Total: 2,972
  - Density: 65.8/km^{2} (170/sq mi)
- Time zone: UTC+1 (CET)
  - Summer (DST): UTC+2 (CEST)
- Postal code: 5235
- Area code(s): (+36) 59

Tiszabura is a village in Jász-Nagykun-Szolnok county, in the Northern Great Plain region of central Hungary.

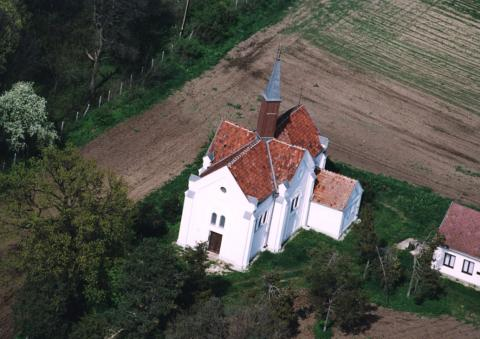
Aerial photography of Tiszabura

== Geography ==
It covers an area of 45.2 km^{2} (17 sq mi) and has a population of 2972 people (2015).
