= Tés =

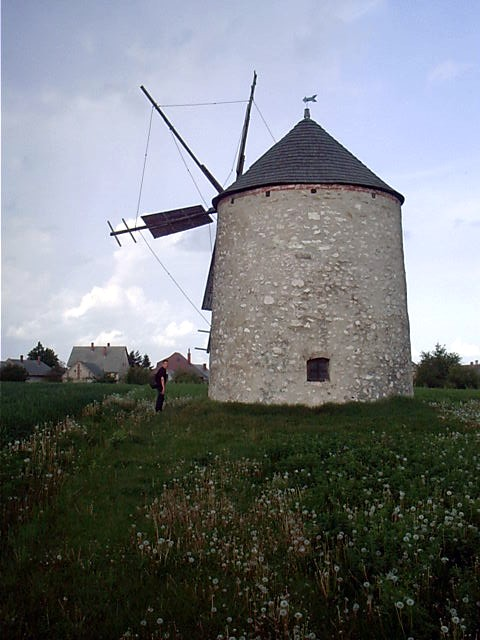
- A windmill in Tés

- Flag Coat of arms

- Location of Tés
- Coordinates: 47.25621°N 18.02708°E
- Country: Hungary
- County: Veszprém

Area
  - Total: 49.03 km^{2} (18.93 sq mi)

Population (2015)
  - Total: 766
  - Density: 15.6/km^{2} (40/sq mi)
- Time zone: UTC+1 (CET)
  - Summer (DST): UTC+2 (CEST)
- Postal code: 8109
- Area code: 88

Tés is a village in Veszprém County, Hungary.

== History ==
Tés is one of the most commanding settlements of the Bakony mountain, it can be found on the largest plateau of the East-Bakony at the height of 465 m. The number of residents has been about 900 for ages. According to a legend, the village got its name from King Matthias who spent a lot of time in Várpalota. On one of these occasions, he located prisoners onto the hill that was supposedly the habitat of bears in those days. While selecting the prisoners, he kept repeating 'You too, you too' that is in Hungarian 'Te is mész, te is mész, te is, te is, te is.' The name of the village, Tés was born from the contraction of 'te is'. Of course this is just a folktale, in point of fact the origin of the name of the village is unknown.

The first written document, which mentions the village under the name of Tehes, is from 1086. The settlement didn't have a constant landowner. It was the property of the Benedictine Bakonybél Abbey, it also belonged to the Bakonyi Erdőispánság and paid taxes to almost everybody who had ever been the master of the land.

During the Turkish occupation the number of residents decreased incredibly, what's more, at the time of Rákóczi's War for Independence it also fell, hence, hardly any residents remained alive in the village. In the 18th century there were resettlements in several cases from the Princedom of Baden, Saxony and different parts of Hungary.

It was primarily the difficult traffic that prevented Tés from improvement. It was burdensome to get to the commanding plateau by animal-drawn vehicles. The construction of the Hungarian-Western railway line was finished in 1872. Thanks to this railway, whose distance was 15 km from the village, people could reach the other parts of the country. At that time, the nearest villages could be approached on foot or by horse only. The first public transport vehicles started to operate in 1956, which meant two buses a day.

It was just the beginning of the development of the infrastructure of the village. First the open wire telephone line system was set up in 1886, then in 1996–1997 it was changed to optical cables. Postal services are available for the residents since the end of the 19th century.

At the same time the first shop was also opened. Shopkeepers transported the goods on foot, later by horse. The 'Hangya' co-op store was opened in 1925.

The education in the settlement has a 250-year-old history. The village had an own primary school from 1737 to 2005. The local government decided to close it due to the low number of students.

== Sights ==
=== The Windmills ===
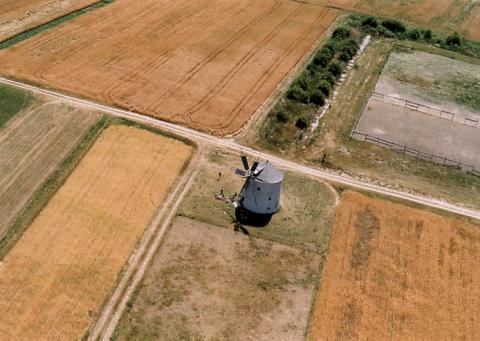
Windmill near Tés.

The six-shoveled windmills are the main attractions of Tés. Once there were 4 windmills, but today there is no trace of the Rotter and Vaszlav windmills. Only one of the remaining two windmills is in operational status. The windmills are in the gardens of Táncsics street.

The Helt windmill was built in 1840 by János Pircher. This is a round-shaped, three-storey building, made of rock. It has tapered, shingle roof, which can be rotated, nice, small windows and it is pushed by a six-sailed pinwheel. There are two pairs of millstones in the windmill and they can mill 4 quintals a day.

The windmill, which was built in 1924 by János Ozi, is 200 m away from the Helt windmill. The structure of the windmill is the same, the only difference is that in the Ozi windmill there is only one pair of millstones. The windmills are protected national monuments, and they can be visited all year long.

=== Churches ===
The first church of the village was built before 1276 in pursuance of King István's command, which said: Every ten villages must have a church built by rock. Tés was a churched settlement, it had a church and also a priest, therefore it was called Egyházastés until 1566. The village has a Catholic and an Evangelical church today.

==== The Catholic church ====
The middle part of the present catholic church was renovated in 1725 by Earl Ferenc Bertram Nesszelrode. He was the provost of Székesfehérvár. The church proved close, so János Horváth, bishop of Székesfehérvár, like a patron, started to expand it in 1834. After his dead, the bedchamber continued the construction. It was finished in 1837. In that year the church was re-sanctified, and St. István became its patron saint. The original vestry converted to a chapel, in which an altar was set up. Above the altar there was made an oratorio. Its furnishing consist of baroque altar-piece, plait pulpit, baroque crucifix, and a plait christening fount. Its oldest picture is in the right side of the nave. It shows Jesus hanging on the cross and it is from the 16th century.

==== The Evangelical church ====
The construction of the Evangelical church begun in 1785 and it was finished in 1786. The organ was bought in 1806 and the bells in 1808. In 1864 the church was fully renovated, and it was also at that time when the tower was built. Its furnishing consists of a baroque altarpiece and a marble-adorned pulpit. György Tarlósi was the first known evangelical clergyman of Tés.

=== The Alba Regia cave ===
The Alba Regia cave is the third deepest cave in the country. Its exploration was begun in 1975 and due to the hostile environment it took for quite a long time. In October, the entrance test hole, which depth is almost five meters, was dug. Exploratories went along the next 30 metres through strait routes full of scree. Then, beyond some crannies, they reached the so-called "Explorer branch" of the cave in which the first stalagmites could be seen. At the bottom of the test hole, sunk in extremely difficult circumstances, the channel was opened on 24 October. The air temperature of the inner passages of Cave Alba Regia is about 7 degrees lower than the Hungarian average 8,1-8,5 °C. During the exploration, the strong enrichment of carbon dioxide in some passages became apparent. It is Istvan Eszterhas who collects and converses the wildlife of the cave that was wholly closed until its discovery. He started trapping in 1976, and even in that year he could differentiate between 21 species. In 1977, the number of cave creatures increased to 56, and in 1979, it was as high as 70. The cave can be visited only with a permission and a professional guide.

=== 'Római fürdő' ===
The Gaja runnel cut the limestone face deep and created the breakthrough called 'Római fürdő'. The runnel running through the canyon is the spectacular at the time of snowbreak with the small riffles and falls.

Római fürdő is located some distance from the village, in the middle of the forest. A rest area with facilities for cooking over an open fire is available at the excursion site. It can be reached on foot from Tés or Bakonynána.
