= Tivadar, Szabolcs-Szatmár-Bereg County =

Tivadar
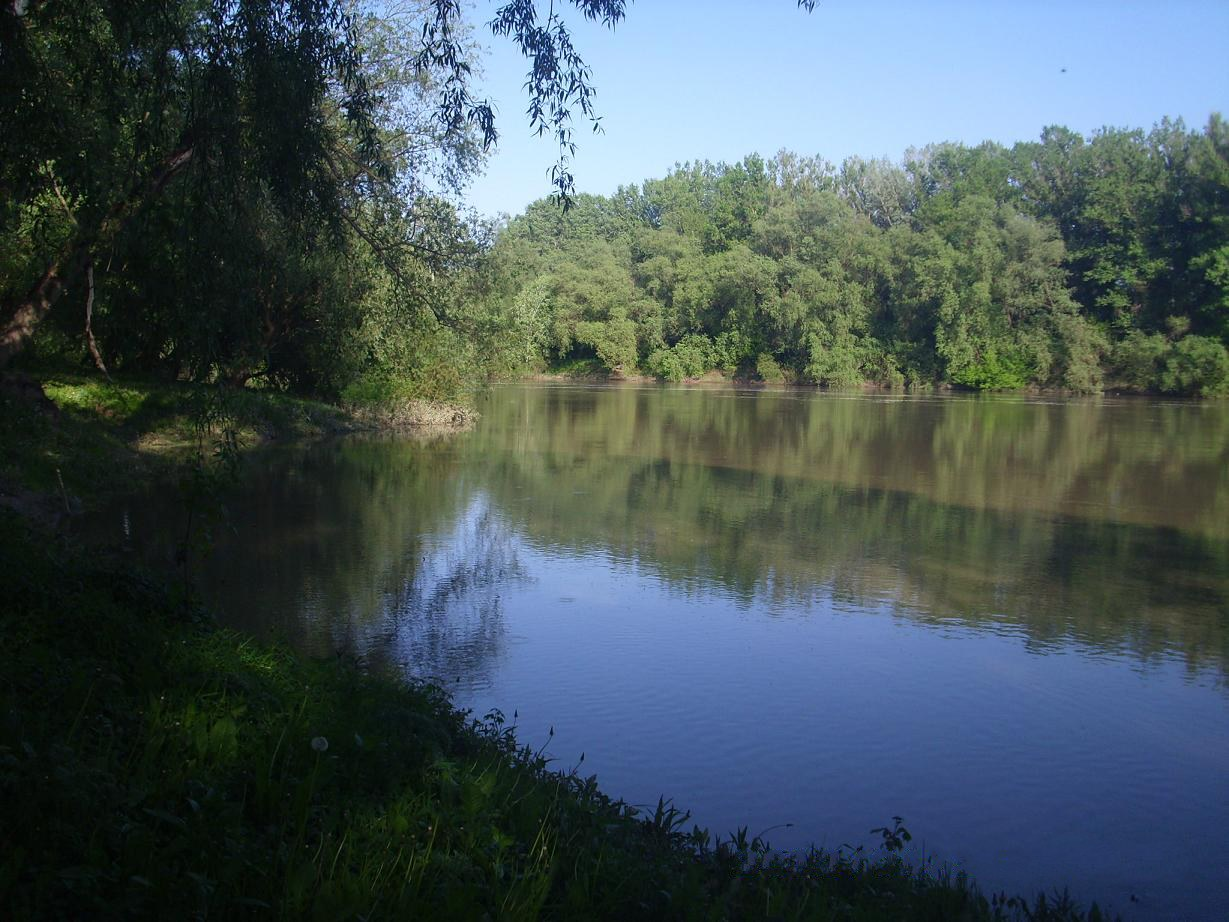
- Tisa River in Tivadar, Hungary.

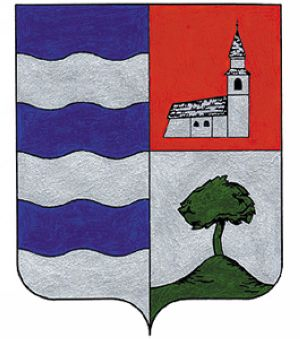
- Coat of arms

- Location of Tivadar in Hungary. Tivadar (Szabolcs-Szatmár-Bereg County)
- Coordinates: 48°04′N 22°31′E
- Country: Hungary
- Regions: Northern Great Plain
- County: Szabolcs-Szatmár-Bereg
- District: Fehérgyarmat District

Government
  - Mayor: Danó Sándor

Area
  - Total: 4.80 km^{2} (1.85 sq mi)

Population (2022)
  - Total: 166
  - Density: 34.6/km^{2} (89.6/sq mi)
- Time zone: UTC+1 (CET)
  - Summer (DST): UTC+2 (CEST)
- Postal code: 4921
- Area code: 45
- Website: http://www.tivadar.hu

Tivadar is a village in Szabolcs-Szatmár-Bereg county, in the Northern Great Plain region of eastern Hungary.

== Geography ==
It covers an area of 4.80 km^{2} (2 sq mi) and has a population of 166 people according to the 2022 census.

The village is located on the Tisa River, with the village of Kisar on the other side of the river.

== History ==
The name Tivadar first appeared in the papal tithe register in 1333. It was already a prosperous settlement in the 14th century, owned by the Gulácsi family.

In 1428 the Petneházi family and in 1435 the Jármi family also owned the settlement. In 1551, Demeter Oroszi also received a share as a royal gift. In 1566, the village was destroyed by the Tartar auxiliaries of the Turks. In 1599, the Transylvanian princely councilor Miklós Zólyomi of Alesi acquired a share of the land by exchange. Between 1600 and 1676 several of its owners were recorded. In 1800, the families of Kölcsei, Szarka, Vincze, Gacsályi and Matolcsi, among others, had a larger estate here.
