= Tomajmonostora =

- Village
- Coat of arms

- Location within Hungary
- Coordinates: 47°26′02″N 20°42′07″E
- Country: Hungary
- County: Jász-Nagykun-Szolnok
- District: Kunhegyes

Area
  - Total: 13.76 km^{2} (5.31 sq mi)

Population (2015)
  - Total: 729
  - Density: 53/km^{2} (140/sq mi)
- Time zone: UTC+1 (CET)
  - Summer (DST): UTC+2 (CEST)
- Postal code: 5324
- Area code(s): (+36) 59

Tomajmonostora is a village in Jász-Nagykun-Szolnok county, in the Northern Great Plain region of central Hungary.

== Geography ==
It covers an area of 13.76 km^{2} (5 sq mi) and has a population of 729 people (2015).

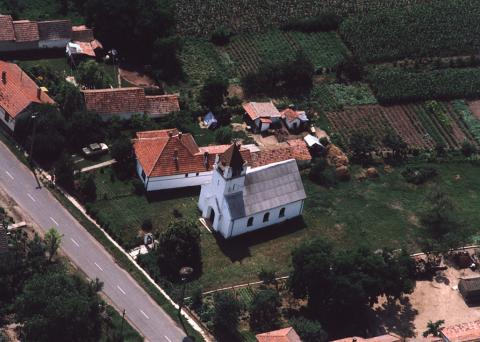
Aerial photography of Tomajmonostora
