= Törökszentmiklós =

- Town
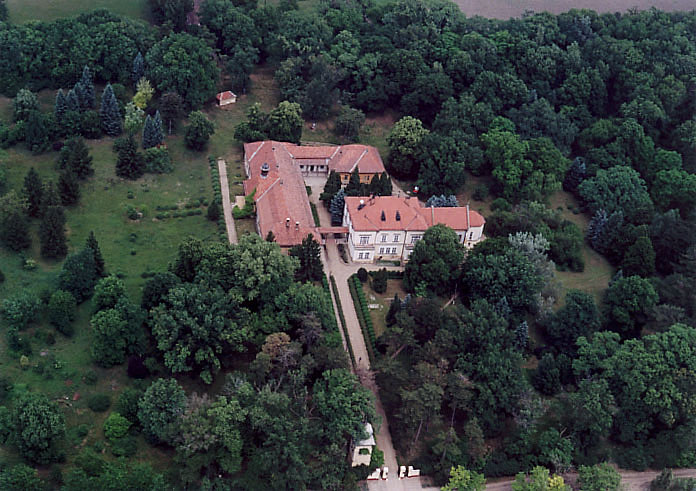
- Törökszentmiklós Palace from above

- Flag Coat of arms

- Location within Hungary
- Coordinates: 47°11′N 20°25′E
- Country: Hungary
- County: Jász-Nagykun-Szolnok
- District: Törökszentmiklós

Area
  - Total: 185.16 km^{2} (71.49 sq mi)

Population (2002)
  - Total: 23,145
  - Density: 125/km^{2} (320/sq mi)
- Time zone: UTC+1 (CET)
  - Summer (DST): UTC+2 (CEST)
- Postal code: 5200
- Area code: (+36) 56
- Website: torokszentmiklos.hu

Törökszentmiklós [tørøksɛntmikloːʃ] is a town in Jász-Nagykun-Szolnok county, in the Northern Great Plain region of central Hungary. It is the third-largest settlement in the county.

== Geography ==
It covers an area of 185.16 km^{2} (71 sq mi) and has a population of 23,145 (2002).

== History ==
The settlement was first mentioned (as Zenthmyclos) in charters of King Zsigmond in 1399.

In 1552 the castle of Balaszentmiklós fell under the Turkish siege (Török is Hungarian for "Turkish"). In 1685 it was destroyed.

In 1738 the settlement, then known as Török Szent Miklós, became a market town.

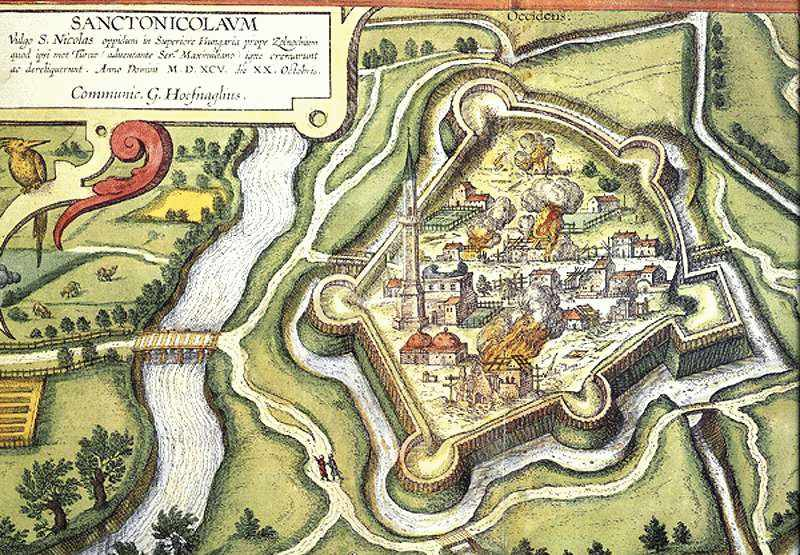
The castle from the Middle Ages.

== Politics ==
Between the 1990s and 2014 local politics were dominated by Fidesz and Fidesz-supporting independent groups, but Jobbik became the majority party in the Municipal Assembly at the 2014 Hungarian local elections.

The current mayor of Törökszentmiklós is Imre Markót (Our Home Szentmiklós).

The local Municipal Assembly, elected at the 2019 Hungarian local elections, is made up of 11 members (1 mayor, 7 individual constituency MEPs and 3 compensation list MEPs) divided between these political parties and alliances:

Party	Seats	Current Municipal Assembly
Our Home Szentmiklós	6	M
Fidesz-KDNP	5	
Independent	1	

== Sport ==
The association football club, Törökszentmiklósi FC, is based in the town.

== Twin towns – sister cities ==
Törökszentmiklós is twinned with:

- Lendava, Slovenia
- Nevetlenfolu, Ukraine
- Ryglice, Poland
- Senta, Serbia
- Sic, Romania
