= Igrici =

- Location of Borsod-Abaúj-Zemplén county in Hungary

- Location of Igrici
- Coordinates: 47.86743°N 20.88267°E
- Country: Hungary
- County: Borsod-Abaúj-Zemplén

Area
  - Total: 19.47 km^{2} (7.52 sq mi)

Population (2004)
  - Total: 1,278
  - Density: 65.63/km^{2} (170.0/sq mi)
- Time zone: UTC+1 (CET)
  - Summer (DST): UTC+2 (CEST)
- Postal code: 3459
- Area code: 49

Igrici is a village in Borsod-Abaúj-Zemplén county, Hungary.
