= Tiszatarján =

- Village
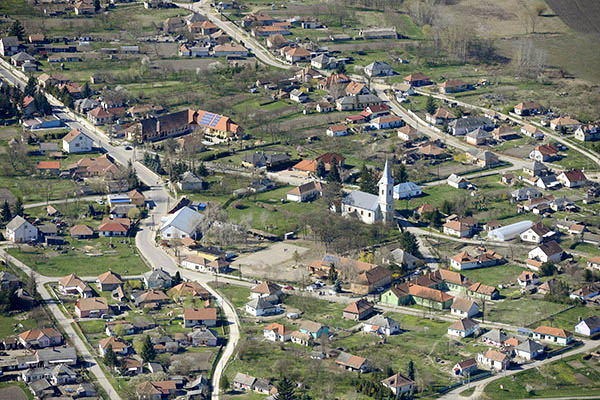

- Flag Coat of arms

- Location of Tiszatarján
- Coordinates: 47.83331°N 21.00015°E
- Country: Hungary
- Region: Northern Hungary
- County: Borsod-Abaúj-Zemplén
- District: Mezőcsát

Area
  - Total: 40.40 km^{2} (15.60 sq mi)

Population (1 January 2026)
  - Total: 1,319
  - Density: 32.65/km^{2} (84.56/sq mi)
- Time zone: UTC+1 (CET)
  - Summer (DST): UTC+2 (CEST)
- Postal code: 3589
- Area code: (+36) 49
- Website: www.tiszatarjan.hu

Tiszatarján is a village in Borsod-Abaúj-Zemplén County in northeastern Hungary.
