= Hejőpapi =

Coordinates: 47°54′N 20°55′E

- Village
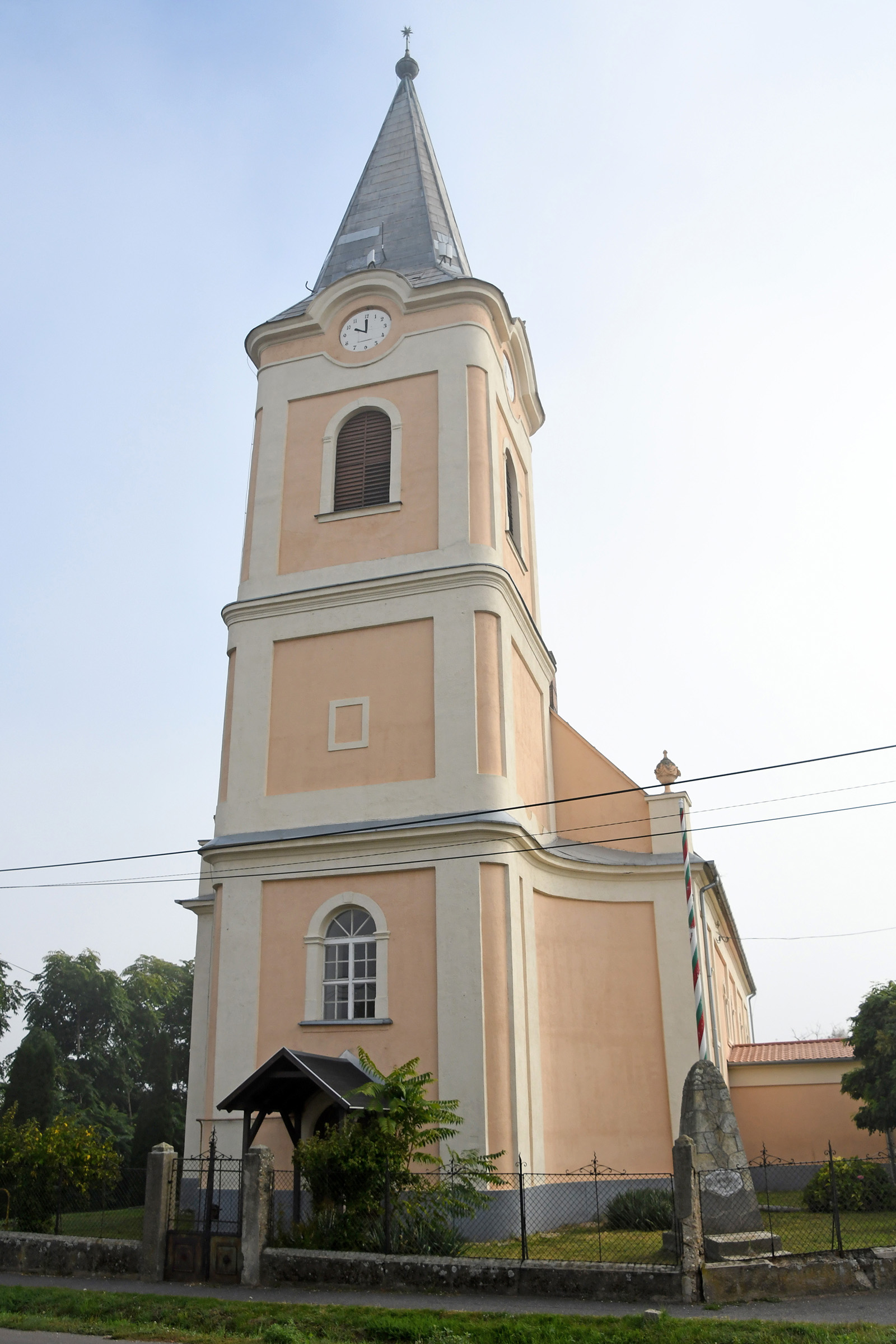
- Calvinist church in Hejőpapi
- Interactive map of Hejőpapi
- Country: Hungary
- Regions: Northern Hungary
- County: Borsod-Abaúj-Zemplén County
- Time zone: UTC+1 (CET)
  - Summer (DST): UTC+2 (CEST)

Hejőpapi is a village in Borsod-Abaúj-Zemplén County in northeastern Hungary.
