= Tiszadorogma =

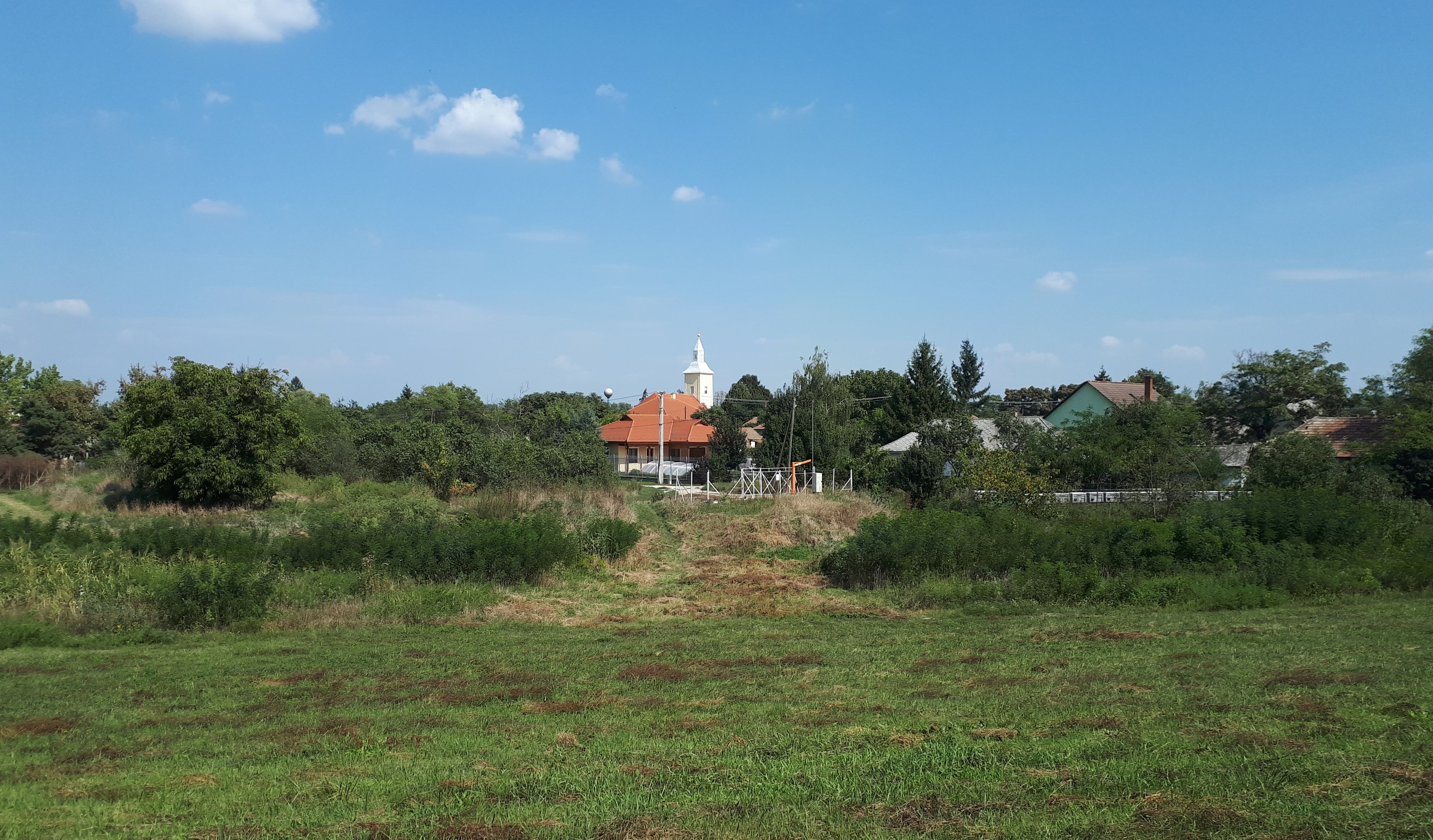
- Tiszadorogma

- Coat of arms

- Location of Tiszadorogma
- Coordinates: 47.68590°N 20.86581°E
- Country: Hungary
- County: Borsod-Abaúj-Zemplén

Area
  - Total: 46.61 km^{2} (18.00 sq mi)

Population (2004)
  - Total: 466
  - Density: 9.99/km^{2} (25.9/sq mi)
- Time zone: UTC+1 (CET)
  - Summer (DST): UTC+2 (CEST)
- Postal code: 3466
- Area code: 49

Tiszadorogma is a village in Borsod-Abaúj-Zemplén county, Hungary.
