= List of minor planets: 554001–555000 =

The following is a partial list of minor planets, running from minor-planet number 554001 through 555000, inclusive. The primary data for this and other partial lists is based on JPL's "Small-Body Orbital Elements" and data available from the Minor Planet Center. Critical list information is also provided by the MPC, unless otherwise specified from Lowell Observatory. A detailed description of the table's columns and additional sources are given on the main page including a complete list of every page in this series, and a statistical break-up on the dynamical classification of minor planets.

Also see the summary list of all named bodies in numerical and alphabetical order, and the corresponding naming citations for the number range of this particular list. New namings may only be added to this list after official publication, as the preannouncement of names is condemned by the Working Group for Small Bodies Nomenclature of the International Astronomical Union.

Near-Earth obj.	MBA (inner)	MBA (outer)	Centaur
Mars-crosser	MBA (middle)	Jupiter trojan	Trans-Neptunian obj.
Unclassified

== 554001–554100 ==
Designation			Discovery			Properties		Ref
Permanent	Provisional	Named after	Date	Site	Discoverer(s)	Category	Diam.	Ref
554001	2012 FF_{89}	—	July 31, 2014	Haleakala	Pan-STARRS 1	·	1.2 km	MPC · JPL
554002	2012 FX_{90}	—	March 31, 2012	Mount Lemmon	Mount Lemmon Survey	EUN	830 m	MPC · JPL
554003	2012 FM_{92}	—	March 28, 2012	Mount Lemmon	Mount Lemmon Survey	VER	1.9 km	MPC · JPL
554004	2012 FQ_{99}	—	March 16, 2012	Mount Lemmon	Mount Lemmon Survey	·	1.5 km	MPC · JPL
554005	2012 FM_{100}	—	March 16, 2012	Mount Lemmon	Mount Lemmon Survey	·	1.6 km	MPC · JPL
554006	2012 FN_{102}	—	March 17, 2012	Mount Lemmon	Mount Lemmon Survey	·	2.3 km	MPC · JPL
554007	2012 FE_{105}	—	March 21, 2012	Catalina	CSS	·	2.1 km	MPC · JPL
554008	2012 FF_{105}	—	March 24, 2012	Mount Lemmon	Mount Lemmon Survey	·	1.4 km	MPC · JPL
554009	2012 GJ_{5}	—	October 5, 2005	Catalina	CSS	H	370 m	MPC · JPL
554010	2012 GN_{8}	—	January 27, 2007	Kitt Peak	Spacewatch	·	1.3 km	MPC · JPL
554011	2012 GR_{17}	—	August 20, 2004	Kitt Peak	Spacewatch	·	1.6 km	MPC · JPL
554012	2012 GN_{21}	—	April 15, 2012	Haleakala	Pan-STARRS 1	(1547)	1.4 km	MPC · JPL
554013	2012 GL_{30}	—	January 30, 2012	Mount Lemmon	Mount Lemmon Survey	(194)	1.9 km	MPC · JPL
554014	2012 GV_{33}	—	January 5, 2012	Haleakala	Pan-STARRS 1	·	1.8 km	MPC · JPL
554015	2012 GN_{34}	—	April 15, 2012	Haleakala	Pan-STARRS 1	·	1.7 km	MPC · JPL
554016	2012 GF_{43}	—	April 15, 2012	Haleakala	Pan-STARRS 1	·	940 m	MPC · JPL
554017	2012 GB_{45}	—	April 12, 2012	Haleakala	Pan-STARRS 1	·	500 m	MPC · JPL
554018	2012 GF_{49}	—	April 15, 2012	Haleakala	Pan-STARRS 1	AGN	1.0 km	MPC · JPL
554019	2012 GY_{49}	—	April 13, 2012	Mount Lemmon	Mount Lemmon Survey	·	870 m	MPC · JPL
554020	2012 GF_{50}	—	April 13, 2012	Haleakala	Pan-STARRS 1	·	2.9 km	MPC · JPL
554021	2012 HL_{4}	—	October 26, 2009	Kitt Peak	Spacewatch	EUN	1.1 km	MPC · JPL
554022	2012 HY_{5}	—	April 17, 2012	Kitt Peak	Spacewatch	·	1.4 km	MPC · JPL
554023	2012 HG_{6}	—	February 8, 2011	Mount Lemmon	Mount Lemmon Survey	·	2.9 km	MPC · JPL
554024	2012 HU_{7}	—	August 31, 2005	Palomar	NEAT	·	1.9 km	MPC · JPL
554025	2012 HY_{10}	—	April 12, 2012	Mayhill-ISON	L. Elenin	·	1.4 km	MPC · JPL
554026	2012 HS_{22}	—	April 20, 2012	Haleakala	Pan-STARRS 1	·	1.6 km	MPC · JPL
554027	2012 HV_{25}	—	February 29, 2012	Kitt Peak	Spacewatch	·	1.2 km	MPC · JPL
554028	2012 HW_{25}	—	April 21, 2012	Haleakala	Pan-STARRS 1	·	1.2 km	MPC · JPL
554029	2012 HV_{27}	—	March 28, 2012	Kitt Peak	Spacewatch	·	560 m	MPC · JPL
554030	2012 HY_{32}	—	April 25, 2012	Kitt Peak	Spacewatch	·	1.8 km	MPC · JPL
554031	2012 HE_{33}	—	April 27, 2012	Haleakala	Pan-STARRS 1	·	1.9 km	MPC · JPL
554032	2012 HK_{34}	—	August 6, 2008	Siding Spring	SSS	·	2.6 km	MPC · JPL
554033	2012 HJ_{45}	—	April 20, 2012	Mount Lemmon	Mount Lemmon Survey	·	1.3 km	MPC · JPL
554034	2012 HA_{46}	—	April 20, 2012	Mount Lemmon	Mount Lemmon Survey	·	1.8 km	MPC · JPL
554035	2012 HU_{48}	—	April 21, 2012	Haleakala	Pan-STARRS 1	·	1.8 km	MPC · JPL
554036	2012 HO_{49}	—	January 31, 2003	Kitt Peak	Spacewatch	EUN	1.0 km	MPC · JPL
554037	2012 HT_{58}	—	February 6, 2007	Mount Lemmon	Mount Lemmon Survey	·	1.2 km	MPC · JPL
554038	2012 HH_{59}	—	February 22, 2003	Palomar	NEAT	·	1.7 km	MPC · JPL
554039	2012 HM_{61}	—	April 19, 2012	Mount Lemmon	Mount Lemmon Survey	·	2.2 km	MPC · JPL
554040	2012 HA_{66}	—	September 15, 2009	Mount Lemmon	Mount Lemmon Survey	HNS	1.1 km	MPC · JPL
554041	2012 HC_{75}	—	March 27, 2012	Kitt Peak	Spacewatch	·	1.5 km	MPC · JPL
554042	2012 HA_{87}	—	April 27, 2012	Haleakala	Pan-STARRS 1	·	1.1 km	MPC · JPL
554043	2012 HD_{98}	—	April 27, 2012	Haleakala	Pan-STARRS 1	·	1.6 km	MPC · JPL
554044	2012 HR_{98}	—	April 22, 2012	Kitt Peak	Spacewatch	PAD	1.4 km	MPC · JPL
554045	2012 HD_{100}	—	April 18, 2012	Kitt Peak	Spacewatch	·	1.5 km	MPC · JPL
554046	2012 HQ_{100}	—	April 19, 2012	Mount Lemmon	Mount Lemmon Survey	·	1.0 km	MPC · JPL
554047	2012 HR_{104}	—	April 27, 2012	Kitt Peak	Spacewatch	·	1.2 km	MPC · JPL
554048	2012 JZ_{7}	—	March 15, 2007	Mount Lemmon	Mount Lemmon Survey	MRX	700 m	MPC · JPL
554049	2012 JO_{16}	—	February 10, 2011	Mount Lemmon	Mount Lemmon Survey	·	1.8 km	MPC · JPL
554050	2012 JK_{21}	—	May 2, 2012	Kitt Peak	Spacewatch	·	1.3 km	MPC · JPL
554051	2012 JM_{22}	—	January 6, 2012	Haleakala	Pan-STARRS 1	JUN	1.1 km	MPC · JPL
554052	2012 JG_{23}	—	January 30, 2011	Piszkés-tető	K. Sárneczky, Z. Kuli	EUN	1.6 km	MPC · JPL
554053	2012 JZ_{23}	—	May 25, 2003	Kitt Peak	Spacewatch	·	1.6 km	MPC · JPL
554054	2012 JO_{30}	—	June 30, 2008	Kitt Peak	Spacewatch	·	1.9 km	MPC · JPL
554055	2012 JP_{30}	—	November 16, 2001	Kitt Peak	Spacewatch	·	2.3 km	MPC · JPL
554056	2012 JC_{32}	—	May 12, 2012	Mount Lemmon	Mount Lemmon Survey	·	2.0 km	MPC · JPL
554057	2012 JB_{36}	—	August 28, 2006	Kitt Peak	Spacewatch	·	610 m	MPC · JPL
554058	2012 JJ_{45}	—	February 8, 2011	Mount Lemmon	Mount Lemmon Survey	EOS	1.5 km	MPC · JPL
554059	2012 JN_{47}	—	May 14, 2012	Haleakala	Pan-STARRS 1	·	1.8 km	MPC · JPL
554060	2012 JZ_{49}	—	April 28, 2012	Mount Lemmon	Mount Lemmon Survey	·	1.4 km	MPC · JPL
554061	2012 JK_{52}	—	May 14, 2012	Haleakala	Pan-STARRS 1	·	1.4 km	MPC · JPL
554062	2012 JJ_{53}	—	April 17, 2012	Kitt Peak	Spacewatch	·	1.3 km	MPC · JPL
554063	2012 JX_{53}	—	March 10, 2007	Mount Lemmon	Mount Lemmon Survey	·	1.4 km	MPC · JPL
554064	2012 JL_{55}	—	May 12, 2012	Mount Lemmon	Mount Lemmon Survey	·	1.0 km	MPC · JPL
554065	2012 JP_{56}	—	September 23, 2009	Mount Lemmon	Mount Lemmon Survey	·	1.6 km	MPC · JPL
554066	2012 JU_{57}	—	May 12, 2012	Mount Lemmon	Mount Lemmon Survey	·	2.1 km	MPC · JPL
554067	2012 JX_{58}	—	June 14, 2004	Kitt Peak	Spacewatch	·	1.1 km	MPC · JPL
554068	2012 JG_{60}	—	January 24, 2007	Mount Lemmon	Mount Lemmon Survey	·	1.4 km	MPC · JPL
554069	2012 JC_{62}	—	January 28, 2011	Mount Lemmon	Mount Lemmon Survey	·	640 m	MPC · JPL
554070	2012 JZ_{62}	—	January 27, 2011	Kitt Peak	Spacewatch	·	1.8 km	MPC · JPL
554071	2012 JG_{64}	—	November 11, 2006	Mount Lemmon	Mount Lemmon Survey	·	930 m	MPC · JPL
554072	2012 JL_{64}	—	February 7, 2011	Mount Lemmon	Mount Lemmon Survey	·	1.5 km	MPC · JPL
554073	2012 JQ_{66}	—	October 14, 2010	Mount Lemmon	Mount Lemmon Survey	·	2.7 km	MPC · JPL
554074	2012 JO_{68}	—	May 15, 2012	Haleakala	Pan-STARRS 1	H	480 m	MPC · JPL
554075	2012 JD_{70}	—	May 14, 2012	Haleakala	Pan-STARRS 1	·	1.7 km	MPC · JPL
554076	2012 KE_{3}	—	February 21, 2007	Kitt Peak	Spacewatch	·	1.4 km	MPC · JPL
554077	2012 KM_{5}	—	April 28, 2012	Mount Lemmon	Mount Lemmon Survey	·	2.7 km	MPC · JPL
554078	2012 KB_{9}	—	March 23, 2012	Mount Lemmon	Mount Lemmon Survey	EUN	1.1 km	MPC · JPL
554079	2012 KH_{13}	—	November 1, 2005	Mount Lemmon	Mount Lemmon Survey	·	2.9 km	MPC · JPL
554080	2012 KU_{13}	—	May 16, 2012	Mount Lemmon	Mount Lemmon Survey	NEM	1.8 km	MPC · JPL
554081	2012 KG_{14}	—	September 6, 2004	Palomar	NEAT	·	1.1 km	MPC · JPL
554082	2012 KD_{17}	—	September 24, 2004	Kitt Peak	Spacewatch	·	1.4 km	MPC · JPL
554083	2012 KD_{19}	—	May 20, 2012	Charleston	R. Holmes	·	1.9 km	MPC · JPL
554084	2012 KW_{19}	—	March 31, 2003	Cerro Tololo	Deep Lens Survey	·	1.3 km	MPC · JPL
554085	2012 KS_{20}	—	April 24, 2012	Mount Lemmon	Mount Lemmon Survey	·	1.6 km	MPC · JPL
554086	2012 KT_{23}	—	May 20, 2012	Mount Lemmon	Mount Lemmon Survey	·	1.8 km	MPC · JPL
554087	2012 KD_{26}	—	March 10, 2007	Mount Lemmon	Mount Lemmon Survey	·	1.7 km	MPC · JPL
554088	2012 KH_{28}	—	April 27, 2012	Haleakala	Pan-STARRS 1	·	1.8 km	MPC · JPL
554089	2012 KJ_{29}	—	February 5, 2011	Mount Lemmon	Mount Lemmon Survey	·	1.4 km	MPC · JPL
554090	2012 KY_{29}	—	April 15, 2012	Haleakala	Pan-STARRS 1	·	860 m	MPC · JPL
554091	2012 KM_{33}	—	May 16, 2012	Mount Lemmon	Mount Lemmon Survey	·	1.4 km	MPC · JPL
554092	2012 KY_{33}	—	June 12, 2008	Kitt Peak	Spacewatch	·	1.3 km	MPC · JPL
554093	2012 KQ_{34}	—	May 16, 2012	Mount Lemmon	Mount Lemmon Survey	·	1.3 km	MPC · JPL
554094	2012 KV_{36}	—	September 17, 2009	Mount Lemmon	Mount Lemmon Survey	·	1.5 km	MPC · JPL
554095	2012 KH_{38}	—	June 15, 2005	Mount Lemmon	Mount Lemmon Survey	NYS	780 m	MPC · JPL
554096	2012 KQ_{40}	—	September 16, 2009	Kitt Peak	Spacewatch	·	760 m	MPC · JPL
554097	2012 KU_{45}	—	February 8, 2011	Mount Lemmon	Mount Lemmon Survey	EUN	1.1 km	MPC · JPL
554098	2012 KP_{49}	—	May 22, 2012	ESA OGS	ESA OGS	·	1.9 km	MPC · JPL
554099	2012 KU_{50}	—	May 18, 2012	La Silla	La Silla	other TNO · moon	204 km	MPC · JPL
554100	2012 KF_{51}	—	May 5, 2003	Kitt Peak	Spacewatch	·	2.5 km	MPC · JPL

== 554101–554200 ==
back to top

Designation			Discovery			Properties		Ref
Permanent	Provisional	Named after	Date	Site	Discoverer(s)	Category	Diam.	Ref
554101	2012 KR_{51}	—	April 28, 2012	Mount Lemmon	Mount Lemmon Survey	GEF	1.3 km	MPC · JPL
554102	2012 KW_{51}	—	May 18, 2012	Haleakala	Pan-STARRS 1	twotino	194 km	MPC · JPL
554103	2012 KE_{54}	—	February 14, 2016	Haleakala	Pan-STARRS 1	·	1.9 km	MPC · JPL
554104	2012 KC_{57}	—	November 23, 2014	Haleakala	Pan-STARRS 1	·	2.4 km	MPC · JPL
554105	2012 KE_{57}	—	May 21, 2012	Haleakala	Pan-STARRS 1	TIN	1.2 km	MPC · JPL
554106	2012 KP_{57}	—	August 14, 2013	Haleakala	Pan-STARRS 1	HOF	2.2 km	MPC · JPL
554107	2012 KG_{59}	—	May 28, 2012	Mount Lemmon	Mount Lemmon Survey	·	1.9 km	MPC · JPL
554108	2012 KN_{61}	—	May 22, 2012	Kitt Peak	Spacewatch	·	2.2 km	MPC · JPL
554109	2012 KS_{61}	—	May 18, 2012	Kitt Peak	Spacewatch	H	470 m	MPC · JPL
554110	2012 LY_{4}	—	May 21, 2012	Haleakala	Pan-STARRS 1	H	510 m	MPC · JPL
554111	2012 LZ_{4}	—	June 12, 2012	Haleakala	Pan-STARRS 1	·	1.9 km	MPC · JPL
554112	2012 LA_{6}	—	September 26, 2003	Apache Point	SDSS Collaboration	·	3.0 km	MPC · JPL
554113	2012 LJ_{6}	—	December 10, 2010	Mount Lemmon	Mount Lemmon Survey	·	1.9 km	MPC · JPL
554114	2012 LY_{7}	—	February 6, 2006	Kitt Peak	Spacewatch	·	2.0 km	MPC · JPL
554115	2012 LQ_{10}	—	June 15, 2012	Haleakala	Pan-STARRS 1	·	1.8 km	MPC · JPL
554116	2012 LZ_{11}	—	June 14, 2012	Oukaïmeden	C. Rinner	TIN	1.1 km	MPC · JPL
554117	2012 LN_{20}	—	May 15, 2012	Mount Lemmon	Mount Lemmon Survey	·	2.3 km	MPC · JPL
554118	2012 LH_{22}	—	January 6, 2010	Kitt Peak	Spacewatch	·	2.5 km	MPC · JPL
554119	2012 LQ_{25}	—	November 24, 2002	Palomar	NEAT	·	2.9 km	MPC · JPL
554120	2012 LZ_{25}	—	April 25, 2007	Mount Lemmon	Mount Lemmon Survey	·	1.4 km	MPC · JPL
554121	2012 LG_{29}	—	October 23, 2008	Kitt Peak	Spacewatch	HYG	2.3 km	MPC · JPL
554122	2012 MB_{2}	—	June 17, 2012	Mount Lemmon	Mount Lemmon Survey	·	3.3 km	MPC · JPL
554123	2012 MN_{6}	—	June 21, 2012	Mount Lemmon	Mount Lemmon Survey	L5	7.5 km	MPC · JPL
554124	2012 MB_{12}	—	October 2, 2008	Kitt Peak	Spacewatch	·	1.9 km	MPC · JPL
554125	2012 MV_{18}	—	June 16, 2012	Haleakala	Pan-STARRS 1	·	910 m	MPC · JPL
554126	2012 NP	—	July 13, 2012	Socorro	LINEAR	AMO	190 m	MPC · JPL
554127	2012 NQ_{1}	—	April 16, 2007	Mount Lemmon	Mount Lemmon Survey	·	2.2 km	MPC · JPL
554128	2012 OC	—	September 29, 2003	Kitt Peak	Spacewatch	·	2.0 km	MPC · JPL
554129	2012 OA_{7}	—	July 21, 2012	Charleston	R. Holmes	·	2.2 km	MPC · JPL
554130	2012 PF_{5}	—	August 7, 2012	Marly	Kocher, F.	·	3.9 km	MPC · JPL
554131	2012 PD_{9}	—	August 8, 2012	Haleakala	Pan-STARRS 1	·	2.7 km	MPC · JPL
554132	2012 PV_{10}	—	February 13, 2010	Calvin-Rehoboth	L. A. Molnar	·	1.1 km	MPC · JPL
554133	2012 PK_{15}	—	August 11, 2012	Charleston	R. Holmes	·	2.9 km	MPC · JPL
554134	2012 PA_{17}	—	August 12, 2012	Haleakala	Pan-STARRS 1	TEL	1.1 km	MPC · JPL
554135	2012 PH_{20}	—	February 20, 2006	Kitt Peak	Spacewatch	·	1.8 km	MPC · JPL
554136	2012 PR_{23}	—	November 8, 2009	Kitt Peak	Spacewatch	·	410 m	MPC · JPL
554137	2012 PR_{24}	—	February 10, 2011	Mount Lemmon	Mount Lemmon Survey	·	1.2 km	MPC · JPL
554138	2012 PZ_{32}	—	July 11, 2005	Mount Lemmon	Mount Lemmon Survey	·	690 m	MPC · JPL
554139	2012 PB_{33}	—	November 26, 2003	Socorro	LINEAR	·	3.4 km	MPC · JPL
554140	2012 PD_{35}	—	August 11, 2012	Siding Spring	SSS	·	690 m	MPC · JPL
554141	2012 PF_{35}	—	August 26, 2003	Socorro	LINEAR	·	2.8 km	MPC · JPL
554142	2012 PP_{38}	—	August 23, 2007	Kitt Peak	Spacewatch	·	2.9 km	MPC · JPL
554143	2012 PS_{38}	—	August 6, 2012	Haleakala	Pan-STARRS 1	·	1.6 km	MPC · JPL
554144	2012 PM_{39}	—	September 24, 1992	Kitt Peak	Spacewatch	·	820 m	MPC · JPL
554145	2012 PU_{42}	—	August 13, 2012	Haleakala	Pan-STARRS 1	EOS	1.6 km	MPC · JPL
554146	2012 PC_{43}	—	September 9, 2007	Kitt Peak	Spacewatch	EOS	1.8 km	MPC · JPL
554147	2012 PP_{43}	—	August 14, 2012	Haleakala	Pan-STARRS 1	URS	2.9 km	MPC · JPL
554148	2012 PH_{47}	—	December 21, 2014	Haleakala	Pan-STARRS 1	·	2.2 km	MPC · JPL
554149	2012 PZ_{52}	—	January 26, 2015	Haleakala	Pan-STARRS 1	BRA	1.1 km	MPC · JPL
554150	2012 PW_{54}	—	August 14, 2012	Haleakala	Pan-STARRS 1	·	2.6 km	MPC · JPL
554151	2012 PQ_{56}	—	August 14, 2012	Haleakala	Pan-STARRS 1	EOS	1.3 km	MPC · JPL
554152	2012 QU_{1}	—	September 4, 2007	Mount Lemmon	Mount Lemmon Survey	·	1.6 km	MPC · JPL
554153	2012 QX_{1}	—	August 16, 2012	ESA OGS	ESA OGS	EOS	1.8 km	MPC · JPL
554154	2012 QZ_{1}	—	August 16, 2012	ESA OGS	ESA OGS	·	3.0 km	MPC · JPL
554155	2012 QG_{6}	—	October 24, 2005	Mauna Kea	A. Boattini	·	2.1 km	MPC · JPL
554156	2012 QK_{7}	—	September 14, 2007	Kitt Peak	Spacewatch	EOS	1.4 km	MPC · JPL
554157	2012 QN_{13}	—	August 17, 2012	Haleakala	Pan-STARRS 1	·	2.1 km	MPC · JPL
554158	2012 QR_{14}	—	June 4, 2006	Mount Lemmon	Mount Lemmon Survey	·	3.8 km	MPC · JPL
554159	2012 QZ_{14}	—	September 3, 2005	Palomar	NEAT	PHO	790 m	MPC · JPL
554160	2012 QT_{15}	—	August 21, 2012	Haleakala	Pan-STARRS 1	·	3.1 km	MPC · JPL
554161	2012 QP_{16}	—	October 6, 2002	Palomar	NEAT	·	2.5 km	MPC · JPL
554162	2012 QS_{16}	—	August 16, 2012	Haleakala	Pan-STARRS 1	·	2.6 km	MPC · JPL
554163	2012 QH_{18}	—	August 17, 2012	Haleakala	Pan-STARRS 1	KOR	1.3 km	MPC · JPL
554164	2012 QT_{19}	—	March 18, 2010	Mount Lemmon	Mount Lemmon Survey	·	2.5 km	MPC · JPL
554165	2012 QB_{20}	—	August 22, 2012	Haleakala	Pan-STARRS 1	EOS	1.5 km	MPC · JPL
554166	2012 QD_{23}	—	March 20, 2007	Mount Lemmon	Mount Lemmon Survey	L5	9.9 km	MPC · JPL
554167	2012 QS_{25}	—	August 24, 2012	Kitt Peak	Spacewatch	L5	8.4 km	MPC · JPL
554168	2012 QV_{26}	—	September 14, 2002	Palomar	NEAT	·	650 m	MPC · JPL
554169	2012 QG_{29}	—	June 4, 2011	Mount Lemmon	Mount Lemmon Survey	·	2.7 km	MPC · JPL
554170	2012 QT_{30}	—	August 25, 2012	Kitt Peak	Spacewatch	·	2.2 km	MPC · JPL
554171	2012 QD_{31}	—	August 25, 2012	Kitt Peak	Spacewatch	·	2.7 km	MPC · JPL
554172	2012 QF_{32}	—	August 25, 2012	Kitt Peak	Spacewatch	·	2.3 km	MPC · JPL
554173	2012 QG_{32}	—	December 22, 2008	Kitt Peak	Spacewatch	EOS	1.9 km	MPC · JPL
554174	2012 QJ_{32}	—	October 31, 2007	Mount Lemmon	Mount Lemmon Survey	·	2.8 km	MPC · JPL
554175	2012 QU_{32}	—	November 15, 2007	Mount Lemmon	Mount Lemmon Survey	·	3.0 km	MPC · JPL
554176	2012 QF_{40}	—	December 31, 2007	Kitt Peak	Spacewatch	L5	10 km	MPC · JPL
554177	2012 QQ_{43}	—	August 10, 2007	Kitt Peak	Spacewatch	EOS	2.1 km	MPC · JPL
554178	2012 QQ_{46}	—	August 17, 2012	Tenerife	ESA OGS	EOS	1.7 km	MPC · JPL
554179	2012 QD_{48}	—	April 27, 2011	Mount Lemmon	Mount Lemmon Survey	·	1.8 km	MPC · JPL
554180	2012 QO_{49}	—	October 15, 2002	Palomar	NEAT	·	610 m	MPC · JPL
554181	2012 QM_{51}	—	September 1, 2002	Palomar	NEAT	·	3.7 km	MPC · JPL
554182	2012 QD_{52}	—	August 27, 2012	Haleakala	Pan-STARRS 1	TIR	2.5 km	MPC · JPL
554183	2012 QG_{54}	—	September 14, 2002	Palomar	Matson, R. D.	·	800 m	MPC · JPL
554184	2012 QK_{54}	—	August 24, 2012	Kitt Peak	Spacewatch	·	1.5 km	MPC · JPL
554185	2012 QV_{54}	—	August 17, 2012	Siding Spring	SSS	T_{j} (2.98)	3.2 km	MPC · JPL
554186	2012 QO_{55}	—	March 5, 2016	Haleakala	Pan-STARRS 1	·	2.1 km	MPC · JPL
554187	2012 QO_{59}	—	August 26, 2012	Haleakala	Pan-STARRS 1	·	2.5 km	MPC · JPL
554188	2012 QU_{59}	—	August 25, 2012	Kitt Peak	Spacewatch	EOS	1.6 km	MPC · JPL
554189	2012 QT_{61}	—	August 26, 2012	Kitt Peak	Spacewatch	EOS	1.7 km	MPC · JPL
554190	2012 QT_{62}	—	November 28, 2013	Mount Lemmon	Mount Lemmon Survey	·	1.6 km	MPC · JPL
554191	2012 QD_{64}	—	August 17, 2012	Haleakala	Pan-STARRS 1	L5	6.8 km	MPC · JPL
554192	2012 QJ_{64}	—	August 25, 2012	Kitt Peak	Spacewatch	·	1.2 km	MPC · JPL
554193	2012 QP_{64}	—	August 13, 2012	Haleakala	Pan-STARRS 1	EOS	1.2 km	MPC · JPL
554194	2012 QN_{65}	—	August 26, 2012	Kitt Peak	Spacewatch	L5	7.3 km	MPC · JPL
554195	2012 QZ_{65}	—	August 26, 2012	Haleakala	Pan-STARRS 1	EOS	1.7 km	MPC · JPL
554196	2012 RC_{1}	—	September 4, 2012	Haleakala	Pan-STARRS 1	PHO	1 km	MPC · JPL
554197	2012 RC_{2}	—	September 7, 2012	Črni Vrh	Mikuž, H.	·	4.5 km	MPC · JPL
554198	2012 RP_{8}	—	August 26, 2012	Kitt Peak	Spacewatch	·	2.9 km	MPC · JPL
554199	2012 RZ_{12}	—	September 13, 2012	Catalina	CSS	EOS	2.2 km	MPC · JPL
554200	2012 RF_{14}	—	November 25, 2005	Palomar	NEAT	PHO	980 m	MPC · JPL

== 554201–554300 ==
back to top

Designation			Discovery			Properties		Ref
Permanent	Provisional	Named after	Date	Site	Discoverer(s)	Category	Diam.	Ref
554201	2012 RR_{14}	—	February 1, 2009	Mount Lemmon	Mount Lemmon Survey	·	3.2 km	MPC · JPL
554202	2012 RE_{17}	—	September 11, 2012	ASC-Kislovodsk	ASC-Kislovodsk	·	2.4 km	MPC · JPL
554203	2012 RO_{17}	—	September 13, 2012	Charleston	R. Holmes	·	1.8 km	MPC · JPL
554204	2012 RR_{17}	—	November 28, 2002	Haleakala	NEAT	·	1 km	MPC · JPL
554205	2012 RU_{19}	—	September 15, 2012	Mount Lemmon	Mount Lemmon Survey	EOS	1.5 km	MPC · JPL
554206	2012 RJ_{22}	—	September 15, 2012	Alder Springs	Levin, K.	·	1.8 km	MPC · JPL
554207	2012 RB_{27}	—	September 14, 2012	Catalina	CSS	L5	10 km	MPC · JPL
554208	2012 RD_{27}	—	January 18, 2009	Mount Lemmon	Mount Lemmon Survey	EOS	2.0 km	MPC · JPL
554209	2012 RY_{29}	—	September 14, 2007	Kitt Peak	Spacewatch	EOS	1.9 km	MPC · JPL
554210	2012 RE_{30}	—	September 30, 2003	Kitt Peak	Spacewatch	·	2.1 km	MPC · JPL
554211	2012 RX_{30}	—	September 21, 2009	Mount Lemmon	Mount Lemmon Survey	·	480 m	MPC · JPL
554212	2012 RW_{31}	—	September 22, 2009	Mount Lemmon	Mount Lemmon Survey	·	670 m	MPC · JPL
554213	2012 RT_{32}	—	March 10, 2010	Moletai	K. Černis, Zdanavicius, J.	BRA	1.6 km	MPC · JPL
554214	2012 RT_{33}	—	July 21, 2006	Catalina	CSS	TIR	4.3 km	MPC · JPL
554215	2012 RE_{34}	—	August 26, 2012	Haleakala	Pan-STARRS 1	·	2.6 km	MPC · JPL
554216	2012 RZ_{37}	—	April 22, 2002	Kitt Peak	Spacewatch	·	430 m	MPC · JPL
554217	2012 RE_{38}	—	November 17, 2009	Mount Lemmon	Mount Lemmon Survey	·	610 m	MPC · JPL
554218	2012 RQ_{40}	—	July 22, 2001	Palomar	NEAT	·	3.0 km	MPC · JPL
554219	2012 RO_{41}	—	July 1, 2003	Anderson Mesa	LONEOS	·	2.4 km	MPC · JPL
554220	2012 RT_{41}	—	September 15, 2012	ESA OGS	ESA OGS	THM	2.0 km	MPC · JPL
554221	2012 RM_{43}	—	March 16, 2004	Kitt Peak	Spacewatch	·	2.8 km	MPC · JPL
554222	2012 RB_{44}	—	October 18, 2001	Socorro	LINEAR	LIX	2.9 km	MPC · JPL
554223	2012 RS_{44}	—	September 12, 2012	Siding Spring	SSS	·	1.2 km	MPC · JPL
554224	2012 RC_{46}	—	September 14, 2012	Catalina	CSS	·	600 m	MPC · JPL
554225	2012 RP_{46}	—	January 26, 2015	Haleakala	Pan-STARRS 1	·	2.0 km	MPC · JPL
554226	2012 SM_{1}	—	January 1, 2009	Kitt Peak	Spacewatch	·	2.3 km	MPC · JPL
554227	2012 SV_{2}	—	August 14, 2006	Palomar	NEAT	TIR	2.9 km	MPC · JPL
554228	2012 SN_{6}	—	August 2, 2011	Haleakala	Pan-STARRS 1	L5	10 km	MPC · JPL
554229	2012 SW_{6}	—	August 25, 2012	Haleakala	Pan-STARRS 1	·	2.7 km	MPC · JPL
554230	2012 SA_{9}	—	January 27, 2009	Cerro Burek	Burek, Cerro	·	2.7 km	MPC · JPL
554231	2012 SA_{11}	—	March 10, 2005	Kitt Peak	Deep Ecliptic Survey	·	1.8 km	MPC · JPL
554232	2012 SE_{15}	—	August 28, 2006	Catalina	CSS	·	2.9 km	MPC · JPL
554233	2012 SO_{16}	—	September 17, 2012	Kitt Peak	Spacewatch	·	2.8 km	MPC · JPL
554234	2012 SK_{17}	—	April 20, 2009	Kitt Peak	Spacewatch	L5	8.9 km	MPC · JPL
554235	2012 SL_{19}	—	September 18, 2012	Mount Lemmon	Mount Lemmon Survey	·	2.2 km	MPC · JPL
554236	2012 SB_{20}	—	October 11, 2007	Kitt Peak	Spacewatch	·	2.2 km	MPC · JPL
554237	2012 SH_{24}	—	August 23, 2003	Cerro Tololo	Deep Ecliptic Survey	·	1.4 km	MPC · JPL
554238	2012 SP_{25}	—	August 28, 2005	Kitt Peak	Spacewatch	·	530 m	MPC · JPL
554239 Montseypedro	2012 SV_{26}	Montseypedro	August 24, 2006	La Cañada	Lacruz, J.	THM	2.2 km	MPC · JPL
554240	2012 SB_{32}	—	August 11, 2012	Westfield	T. Vorobjov, Holmes, R.	EOS	2.2 km	MPC · JPL
554241	2012 SQ_{34}	—	March 18, 2010	Mount Lemmon	Mount Lemmon Survey	·	1.9 km	MPC · JPL
554242	2012 SR_{35}	—	August 26, 2012	Haleakala	Pan-STARRS 1	·	2.0 km	MPC · JPL
554243	2012 SK_{37}	—	September 18, 2012	Mount Lemmon	Mount Lemmon Survey	·	520 m	MPC · JPL
554244	2012 SW_{37}	—	October 12, 2007	Mount Lemmon	Mount Lemmon Survey	·	2.7 km	MPC · JPL
554245	2012 SZ_{39}	—	September 18, 2012	Mount Lemmon	Mount Lemmon Survey	·	2.1 km	MPC · JPL
554246	2012 SK_{42}	—	January 1, 2009	Mount Lemmon	Mount Lemmon Survey	VER	2.6 km	MPC · JPL
554247	2012 SV_{42}	—	December 20, 2009	Mount Lemmon	Mount Lemmon Survey	·	500 m	MPC · JPL
554248	2012 SW_{44}	—	October 10, 2007	Kitt Peak	Spacewatch	·	2.7 km	MPC · JPL
554249	2012 SR_{47}	—	May 23, 2001	Cerro Tololo	Deep Ecliptic Survey	THM	1.9 km	MPC · JPL
554250	2012 SX_{48}	—	October 15, 2001	Palomar	NEAT	·	2.8 km	MPC · JPL
554251	2012 SZ_{50}	—	September 23, 2012	Charleston	R. Holmes	EOS	1.8 km	MPC · JPL
554252	2012 SQ_{51}	—	October 26, 2009	Kitt Peak	Spacewatch	·	640 m	MPC · JPL
554253	2012 SA_{52}	—	September 15, 2007	Kitt Peak	Spacewatch	EOS	1.5 km	MPC · JPL
554254	2012 SZ_{52}	—	October 4, 2007	Kitt Peak	Spacewatch	·	2.0 km	MPC · JPL
554255	2012 SG_{54}	—	October 10, 2001	Palomar	NEAT	TIR	2.6 km	MPC · JPL
554256	2012 SP_{54}	—	September 19, 2012	Mount Lemmon	Mount Lemmon Survey	·	820 m	MPC · JPL
554257	2012 SJ_{56}	—	June 21, 2006	Catalina	CSS	·	3.9 km	MPC · JPL
554258	2012 SX_{56}	—	August 26, 2012	Haleakala	Pan-STARRS 1	·	560 m	MPC · JPL
554259	2012 SY_{67}	—	September 25, 2012	Mount Lemmon	Mount Lemmon Survey	·	3.0 km	MPC · JPL
554260	2012 SK_{69}	—	September 24, 2012	Mount Lemmon	Mount Lemmon Survey	·	2.2 km	MPC · JPL
554261	2012 SJ_{70}	—	September 19, 2012	Mount Lemmon	Mount Lemmon Survey	PHO	720 m	MPC · JPL
554262	2012 SN_{70}	—	September 19, 2012	Mount Lemmon	Mount Lemmon Survey	·	3.2 km	MPC · JPL
554263	2012 SU_{71}	—	September 21, 2012	Mount Lemmon	Mount Lemmon Survey	·	790 m	MPC · JPL
554264	2012 SF_{72}	—	September 13, 2007	Mount Lemmon	Mount Lemmon Survey	·	1.4 km	MPC · JPL
554265	2012 SP_{72}	—	April 20, 2015	Haleakala	Pan-STARRS 1	PHO	810 m	MPC · JPL
554266	2012 SL_{73}	—	September 17, 2012	Mount Lemmon	Mount Lemmon Survey	·	650 m	MPC · JPL
554267	2012 SR_{73}	—	February 16, 2015	Haleakala	Pan-STARRS 1	EOS	1.5 km	MPC · JPL
554268 Marksylvester	2012 SD_{77}	Marksylvester	September 26, 2012	Mount Lemmon SkyCe	T. Vorobjov	GEF	1.0 km	MPC · JPL
554269	2012 SP_{79}	—	September 19, 2012	Mount Lemmon	Mount Lemmon Survey	·	2.8 km	MPC · JPL
554270	2012 SQ_{79}	—	September 16, 2012	Kitt Peak	Spacewatch	·	3.2 km	MPC · JPL
554271	2012 SG_{80}	—	November 8, 2007	Kitt Peak	Spacewatch	·	1.6 km	MPC · JPL
554272	2012 SU_{80}	—	June 23, 2017	Haleakala	Pan-STARRS 1	·	2.3 km	MPC · JPL
554273	2012 SV_{80}	—	September 21, 2012	Mount Lemmon	Mount Lemmon Survey	LIX	2.8 km	MPC · JPL
554274	2012 SX_{81}	—	December 11, 2013	Mount Lemmon	Mount Lemmon Survey	·	2.0 km	MPC · JPL
554275	2012 SU_{83}	—	March 21, 2015	Haleakala	Pan-STARRS 1	NYS	840 m	MPC · JPL
554276	2012 SH_{84}	—	September 23, 2012	Mount Lemmon	Mount Lemmon Survey	·	570 m	MPC · JPL
554277	2012 SP_{86}	—	September 21, 2012	Mount Lemmon	Mount Lemmon Survey	·	2.6 km	MPC · JPL
554278	2012 ST_{86}	—	September 24, 2012	Mount Lemmon	Mount Lemmon Survey	·	1.8 km	MPC · JPL
554279	2012 SX_{91}	—	September 16, 2012	Mount Lemmon	Mount Lemmon Survey	·	2.6 km	MPC · JPL
554280	2012 TA	—	October 24, 2003	Kitt Peak	Spacewatch	·	3.1 km	MPC · JPL
554281	2012 TF	—	March 31, 2008	Kitt Peak	Spacewatch	L5	7.9 km	MPC · JPL
554282	2012 TK_{5}	—	May 23, 2004	Apache Point	SDSS Collaboration	H	440 m	MPC · JPL
554283	2012 TA_{6}	—	October 4, 2012	Mount Lemmon	Mount Lemmon Survey	·	2.4 km	MPC · JPL
554284	2012 TB_{8}	—	January 18, 2004	Palomar	NEAT	EOS	1.9 km	MPC · JPL
554285	2012 TC_{9}	—	October 7, 2002	Palomar	NEAT	·	650 m	MPC · JPL
554286	2012 TY_{11}	—	September 16, 2012	Mount Lemmon	Mount Lemmon Survey	·	2.5 km	MPC · JPL
554287	2012 TH_{12}	—	February 23, 2007	Mount Lemmon	Mount Lemmon Survey	·	730 m	MPC · JPL
554288	2012 TY_{13}	—	August 12, 2001	Haleakala	NEAT	·	2.6 km	MPC · JPL
554289	2012 TR_{19}	—	September 30, 2001	Palomar	NEAT	·	3.1 km	MPC · JPL
554290	2012 TT_{21}	—	October 6, 2012	Mount Lemmon	Mount Lemmon Survey	·	2.7 km	MPC · JPL
554291	2012 TU_{21}	—	October 6, 2012	Mount Lemmon	Mount Lemmon Survey	HYG	2.3 km	MPC · JPL
554292	2012 TC_{24}	—	October 8, 2012	Mount Lemmon	Mount Lemmon Survey	L5	7.4 km	MPC · JPL
554293	2012 TC_{26}	—	September 13, 1996	Kitt Peak	Spacewatch	·	1.7 km	MPC · JPL
554294	2012 TU_{26}	—	October 6, 2012	Mount Lemmon	Mount Lemmon Survey	·	2.2 km	MPC · JPL
554295	2012 TK_{27}	—	October 8, 2012	Mount Lemmon	Mount Lemmon Survey	DOR	2.3 km	MPC · JPL
554296	2012 TZ_{27}	—	November 2, 2007	Mount Lemmon	Mount Lemmon Survey	·	2.9 km	MPC · JPL
554297	2012 TQ_{28}	—	October 4, 2012	Mount Lemmon	Mount Lemmon Survey	·	490 m	MPC · JPL
554298	2012 TG_{32}	—	November 10, 2009	Kitt Peak	Spacewatch	·	480 m	MPC · JPL
554299	2012 TU_{32}	—	October 6, 2012	Mount Lemmon	Mount Lemmon Survey	·	670 m	MPC · JPL
554300	2012 TE_{34}	—	September 29, 2002	Haleakala	NEAT	·	1.0 km	MPC · JPL

== 554301–554400 ==
back to top

Designation			Discovery			Properties		Ref
Permanent	Provisional	Named after	Date	Site	Discoverer(s)	Category	Diam.	Ref
554301	2012 TS_{35}	—	September 21, 2012	Kitt Peak	Spacewatch	·	2.0 km	MPC · JPL
554302	2012 TT_{38}	—	October 6, 2012	Catalina	CSS	T_{j} (2.99)	3.1 km	MPC · JPL
554303	2012 TV_{38}	—	February 10, 2007	Mount Lemmon	Mount Lemmon Survey	·	560 m	MPC · JPL
554304	2012 TJ_{41}	—	November 2, 2007	Kitt Peak	Spacewatch	·	2.0 km	MPC · JPL
554305	2012 TR_{41}	—	October 8, 2012	Mount Lemmon	Mount Lemmon Survey	·	1.9 km	MPC · JPL
554306	2012 TU_{47}	—	April 4, 2005	Mount Lemmon	Mount Lemmon Survey	·	2.1 km	MPC · JPL
554307	2012 TS_{50}	—	September 15, 2012	ESA OGS	ESA OGS	·	1.4 km	MPC · JPL
554308	2012 TM_{53}	—	October 24, 2005	Palomar	NEAT	·	890 m	MPC · JPL
554309	2012 TM_{55}	—	October 18, 2001	Palomar	NEAT	THM	2.6 km	MPC · JPL
554310	2012 TK_{58}	—	September 15, 2007	Kitt Peak	Spacewatch	EMA	2.5 km	MPC · JPL
554311	2012 TL_{59}	—	October 8, 2012	Mount Lemmon	Mount Lemmon Survey	EOS	1.4 km	MPC · JPL
554312	2012 TT_{61}	—	December 7, 1996	Kitt Peak	Spacewatch	·	3.7 km	MPC · JPL
554313	2012 TD_{63}	—	October 8, 2012	Haleakala	Pan-STARRS 1	·	2.4 km	MPC · JPL
554314	2012 TF_{63}	—	October 8, 2012	Haleakala	Pan-STARRS 1	·	3.7 km	MPC · JPL
554315	2012 TS_{64}	—	October 8, 2012	Haleakala	Pan-STARRS 1	·	2.2 km	MPC · JPL
554316	2012 TK_{70}	—	October 8, 2012	Haleakala	Pan-STARRS 1	·	2.6 km	MPC · JPL
554317 Rorywoodhams	2012 TO_{71}	Rorywoodhams	October 9, 2012	Mayhill	Falla, N.	EOS	1.5 km	MPC · JPL
554318	2012 TC_{72}	—	October 9, 2012	Haleakala	Pan-STARRS 1	·	2.2 km	MPC · JPL
554319	2012 TR_{73}	—	August 29, 2005	Palomar	NEAT	·	770 m	MPC · JPL
554320	2012 TA_{76}	—	October 9, 2012	Haleakala	Pan-STARRS 1	·	2.1 km	MPC · JPL
554321	2012 TQ_{76}	—	December 18, 2009	Kitt Peak	Spacewatch	·	580 m	MPC · JPL
554322	2012 TO_{77}	—	May 24, 2001	Cerro Tololo	Deep Ecliptic Survey	·	3.7 km	MPC · JPL
554323	2012 TR_{80}	—	December 30, 2005	Kitt Peak	Spacewatch	·	930 m	MPC · JPL
554324	2012 TY_{82}	—	October 6, 2012	Mount Lemmon	Mount Lemmon Survey	EOS	1.7 km	MPC · JPL
554325	2012 TG_{86}	—	October 6, 2012	Mount Lemmon	Mount Lemmon Survey	·	3.1 km	MPC · JPL
554326	2012 TZ_{86}	—	September 15, 2012	Mount Lemmon	Mount Lemmon Survey	·	2.5 km	MPC · JPL
554327	2012 TQ_{88}	—	September 24, 2008	Mount Lemmon	Mount Lemmon Survey	·	870 m	MPC · JPL
554328	2012 TK_{89}	—	August 26, 2006	Lulin	LUSS	·	2.7 km	MPC · JPL
554329	2012 TK_{90}	—	October 14, 2001	Apache Point	SDSS Collaboration	·	2.1 km	MPC · JPL
554330	2012 TQ_{93}	—	September 21, 2012	Catalina	CSS	·	650 m	MPC · JPL
554331	2012 TW_{95}	—	October 8, 2012	Kitt Peak	Spacewatch	·	1.4 km	MPC · JPL
554332	2012 TA_{97}	—	April 29, 2003	Haleakala	NEAT	ERI	2.2 km	MPC · JPL
554333	2012 TW_{97}	—	September 16, 2012	Kitt Peak	Spacewatch	·	2.7 km	MPC · JPL
554334	2012 TF_{98}	—	October 8, 2012	Kitt Peak	Spacewatch	·	2.6 km	MPC · JPL
554335	2012 TH_{98}	—	September 15, 2012	Kitt Peak	Spacewatch	EOS	1.9 km	MPC · JPL
554336	2012 TX_{98}	—	September 25, 2006	Kitt Peak	Spacewatch	·	2.4 km	MPC · JPL
554337	2012 TO_{101}	—	November 2, 2007	Mount Lemmon	Mount Lemmon Survey	·	2.3 km	MPC · JPL
554338	2012 TX_{109}	—	October 10, 2012	Mount Lemmon	Mount Lemmon Survey	·	3.0 km	MPC · JPL
554339	2012 TO_{114}	—	September 21, 2012	Kitt Peak	Spacewatch	EOS	1.5 km	MPC · JPL
554340	2012 TG_{115}	—	September 28, 2001	Palomar	NEAT	·	3.3 km	MPC · JPL
554341	2012 TF_{118}	—	October 10, 2012	Mount Lemmon	Mount Lemmon Survey	·	2.3 km	MPC · JPL
554342	2012 TL_{121}	—	September 16, 2012	Kitt Peak	Spacewatch	·	1.7 km	MPC · JPL
554343	2012 TC_{126}	—	September 12, 2002	Palomar	NEAT	·	560 m	MPC · JPL
554344	2012 TC_{128}	—	October 7, 2012	Haleakala	Pan-STARRS 1	·	2.2 km	MPC · JPL
554345	2012 TK_{128}	—	September 16, 2012	Kitt Peak	Spacewatch	EOS	1.5 km	MPC · JPL
554346	2012 TR_{130}	—	August 22, 2006	Palomar	NEAT	·	3.9 km	MPC · JPL
554347	2012 TX_{132}	—	May 23, 2001	Cerro Tololo	Deep Ecliptic Survey	·	2.6 km	MPC · JPL
554348	2012 TS_{133}	—	November 2, 2007	Kitt Peak	Spacewatch	·	2.4 km	MPC · JPL
554349	2012 TY_{137}	—	October 8, 2012	Mount Lemmon	Mount Lemmon Survey	·	2.2 km	MPC · JPL
554350	2012 TU_{138}	—	October 9, 2012	Mount Lemmon	Mount Lemmon Survey	·	2.4 km	MPC · JPL
554351	2012 TG_{140}	—	October 11, 2012	Haleakala	Pan-STARRS 1	·	400 m	MPC · JPL
554352	2012 TF_{144}	—	February 4, 2009	Mount Lemmon	Mount Lemmon Survey	·	2.4 km	MPC · JPL
554353	2012 TX_{144}	—	October 7, 2012	Haleakala	Pan-STARRS 1	EOS	1.7 km	MPC · JPL
554354	2012 TD_{145}	—	October 8, 2012	Haleakala	Pan-STARRS 1	·	2.2 km	MPC · JPL
554355	2012 TF_{145}	—	August 4, 2005	Palomar	NEAT	·	730 m	MPC · JPL
554356	2012 TM_{147}	—	September 16, 2012	Catalina	CSS	·	3.0 km	MPC · JPL
554357	2012 TF_{148}	—	October 8, 2012	Haleakala	Pan-STARRS 1	·	2.7 km	MPC · JPL
554358	2012 TE_{149}	—	July 30, 2005	Palomar	NEAT	·	710 m	MPC · JPL
554359	2012 TK_{150}	—	September 12, 2007	Mount Lemmon	Mount Lemmon Survey	·	1.4 km	MPC · JPL
554360	2012 TS_{151}	—	September 18, 1995	Kitt Peak	Spacewatch	·	2.2 km	MPC · JPL
554361	2012 TY_{153}	—	November 8, 2007	Kitt Peak	Spacewatch	·	2.1 km	MPC · JPL
554362	2012 TB_{156}	—	November 9, 2007	Mount Lemmon	Mount Lemmon Survey	·	2.2 km	MPC · JPL
554363	2012 TE_{156}	—	October 8, 2012	Haleakala	Pan-STARRS 1	EOS	1.4 km	MPC · JPL
554364	2012 TR_{157}	—	October 8, 2012	Haleakala	Pan-STARRS 1	·	2.0 km	MPC · JPL
554365	2012 TZ_{157}	—	October 16, 2001	Kitt Peak	Spacewatch	·	2.3 km	MPC · JPL
554366	2012 TE_{159}	—	September 17, 2012	Kitt Peak	Spacewatch	·	550 m	MPC · JPL
554367	2012 TL_{160}	—	September 17, 2001	Kitt Peak	Spacewatch	·	2.0 km	MPC · JPL
554368	2012 TB_{165}	—	October 8, 2012	Mount Lemmon	Mount Lemmon Survey	·	580 m	MPC · JPL
554369	2012 TT_{167}	—	October 3, 2006	Kitt Peak	Spacewatch	·	2.6 km	MPC · JPL
554370	2012 TB_{168}	—	December 5, 2007	Kitt Peak	Spacewatch	VER	2.1 km	MPC · JPL
554371	2012 TO_{169}	—	August 4, 2005	Palomar	NEAT	·	770 m	MPC · JPL
554372	2012 TV_{170}	—	October 9, 2012	Mount Lemmon	Mount Lemmon Survey	H	260 m	MPC · JPL
554373	2012 TK_{171}	—	October 9, 2012	Mount Lemmon	Mount Lemmon Survey	·	470 m	MPC · JPL
554374	2012 TA_{180}	—	September 24, 2012	Kitt Peak	Spacewatch	·	610 m	MPC · JPL
554375	2012 TJ_{182}	—	October 9, 2012	Haleakala	Pan-STARRS 1	VER	2.1 km	MPC · JPL
554376	2012 TO_{182}	—	September 21, 2012	Kitt Peak	Spacewatch	·	2.4 km	MPC · JPL
554377	2012 TQ_{188}	—	September 17, 2012	Mount Lemmon	Mount Lemmon Survey	·	630 m	MPC · JPL
554378	2012 TJ_{190}	—	October 10, 2012	Kitt Peak	Spacewatch	·	2.5 km	MPC · JPL
554379	2012 TR_{192}	—	November 7, 2007	Kitt Peak	Spacewatch	·	2.8 km	MPC · JPL
554380	2012 TT_{195}	—	August 15, 2006	Palomar	NEAT	LIX	3.6 km	MPC · JPL
554381	2012 TH_{204}	—	October 20, 1995	Kitt Peak	Spacewatch	VER	2.2 km	MPC · JPL
554382	2012 TD_{206}	—	August 29, 2006	Kitt Peak	Spacewatch	·	2.6 km	MPC · JPL
554383	2012 TK_{206}	—	October 11, 2012	Mount Lemmon	Mount Lemmon Survey	·	2.6 km	MPC · JPL
554384	2012 TQ_{207}	—	October 11, 2012	Mount Lemmon	Mount Lemmon Survey	HYG	1.9 km	MPC · JPL
554385	2012 TP_{208}	—	October 11, 2012	Kitt Peak	Spacewatch	·	2.6 km	MPC · JPL
554386	2012 TN_{209}	—	October 11, 2012	Mount Lemmon	Mount Lemmon Survey	·	1.5 km	MPC · JPL
554387	2012 TP_{209}	—	October 11, 2012	Mount Lemmon	Mount Lemmon Survey	·	2.1 km	MPC · JPL
554388	2012 TU_{209}	—	August 27, 2005	Palomar	NEAT	·	740 m	MPC · JPL
554389	2012 TY_{210}	—	February 14, 2005	Kitt Peak	Spacewatch	·	1.5 km	MPC · JPL
554390	2012 TJ_{211}	—	October 11, 2012	Mount Lemmon	Mount Lemmon Survey	·	2.1 km	MPC · JPL
554391	2012 TU_{211}	—	August 31, 2005	Kitt Peak	Spacewatch	·	540 m	MPC · JPL
554392	2012 TX_{211}	—	February 21, 2007	Kitt Peak	Spacewatch	·	590 m	MPC · JPL
554393	2012 TE_{214}	—	October 19, 2006	Kitt Peak	Deep Ecliptic Survey	·	2.4 km	MPC · JPL
554394	2012 TO_{215}	—	October 15, 2001	Palomar	NEAT	·	3.0 km	MPC · JPL
554395	2012 TX_{215}	—	August 28, 2012	Mount Lemmon	Mount Lemmon Survey	·	3.6 km	MPC · JPL
554396	2012 TR_{216}	—	October 2, 2006	Mount Lemmon	Mount Lemmon Survey	·	3.0 km	MPC · JPL
554397	2012 TT_{216}	—	November 4, 2005	Mount Lemmon	Mount Lemmon Survey	ERI	1.3 km	MPC · JPL
554398	2012 TM_{217}	—	September 25, 2007	Mount Lemmon	Mount Lemmon Survey	·	3.4 km	MPC · JPL
554399	2012 TT_{217}	—	October 14, 2012	ESA OGS	ESA OGS	·	1.9 km	MPC · JPL
554400	2012 TE_{218}	—	January 18, 2004	Palomar	NEAT	·	2.9 km	MPC · JPL

== 554401–554500 ==
back to top

Designation			Discovery			Properties		Ref
Permanent	Provisional	Named after	Date	Site	Discoverer(s)	Category	Diam.	Ref
554401	2012 TH_{218}	—	October 14, 2012	Kitt Peak	Spacewatch	·	2.2 km	MPC · JPL
554402	2012 TY_{220}	—	October 14, 2012	Mount Lemmon	Mount Lemmon Survey	·	1.6 km	MPC · JPL
554403	2012 TL_{228}	—	October 6, 2012	Mount Lemmon	Mount Lemmon Survey	·	2.0 km	MPC · JPL
554404	2012 TT_{229}	—	October 9, 2012	Mount Lemmon	Mount Lemmon Survey	·	2.7 km	MPC · JPL
554405	2012 TV_{229}	—	November 5, 2007	Kitt Peak	Spacewatch	·	2.6 km	MPC · JPL
554406	2012 TN_{232}	—	October 15, 2001	Palomar	NEAT	·	2.7 km	MPC · JPL
554407	2012 TN_{233}	—	September 19, 2001	Kitt Peak	Spacewatch	EOS	1.6 km	MPC · JPL
554408	2012 TO_{233}	—	November 8, 2007	Kitt Peak	Spacewatch	·	2.2 km	MPC · JPL
554409	2012 TT_{233}	—	September 24, 2012	Charleston	R. Holmes	EOS	1.6 km	MPC · JPL
554410	2012 TD_{234}	—	March 10, 2005	Mount Lemmon	Mount Lemmon Survey	·	1.9 km	MPC · JPL
554411	2012 TK_{234}	—	October 7, 2012	Haleakala	Pan-STARRS 1	·	1.5 km	MPC · JPL
554412	2012 TA_{235}	—	October 7, 2012	Haleakala	Pan-STARRS 1	·	1.6 km	MPC · JPL
554413	2012 TL_{237}	—	October 7, 2012	Haleakala	Pan-STARRS 1	·	2.5 km	MPC · JPL
554414	2012 TX_{237}	—	November 8, 2007	Kitt Peak	Spacewatch	·	2.5 km	MPC · JPL
554415	2012 TO_{239}	—	October 8, 2012	Mount Lemmon	Mount Lemmon Survey	·	2.8 km	MPC · JPL
554416	2012 TP_{239}	—	February 3, 2009	Mount Lemmon	Mount Lemmon Survey	·	2.6 km	MPC · JPL
554417	2012 TS_{239}	—	October 8, 2012	Mount Lemmon	Mount Lemmon Survey	EOS	1.6 km	MPC · JPL
554418	2012 TQ_{241}	—	August 28, 2006	Kitt Peak	Spacewatch	·	2.9 km	MPC · JPL
554419	2012 TU_{243}	—	February 19, 2009	Mount Lemmon	Mount Lemmon Survey	VER	2.3 km	MPC · JPL
554420	2012 TR_{244}	—	December 17, 2009	Kitt Peak	Spacewatch	·	640 m	MPC · JPL
554421	2012 TA_{247}	—	October 11, 2012	Kitt Peak	Spacewatch	EUP	2.6 km	MPC · JPL
554422	2012 TT_{248}	—	October 11, 2012	Haleakala	Pan-STARRS 1	·	3.0 km	MPC · JPL
554423	2012 TJ_{249}	—	October 11, 2012	Haleakala	Pan-STARRS 1	·	2.4 km	MPC · JPL
554424	2012 TA_{253}	—	October 11, 2012	Haleakala	Pan-STARRS 1	·	2.7 km	MPC · JPL
554425	2012 TA_{254}	—	October 11, 2012	Piszkéstető	K. Sárneczky	·	3.2 km	MPC · JPL
554426	2012 TW_{254}	—	October 11, 2012	Piszkéstető	K. Sárneczky	TIR	2.5 km	MPC · JPL
554427	2012 TZ_{254}	—	July 30, 2001	Palomar	NEAT	·	2.5 km	MPC · JPL
554428	2012 TH_{259}	—	September 2, 2008	Kitt Peak	Spacewatch	·	1.3 km	MPC · JPL
554429	2012 TA_{264}	—	October 8, 2012	Haleakala	Pan-STARRS 1	·	610 m	MPC · JPL
554430	2012 TN_{264}	—	March 1, 2009	Kitt Peak	Spacewatch	VER	2.3 km	MPC · JPL
554431	2012 TD_{265}	—	September 23, 2012	Kitt Peak	Spacewatch	·	2.6 km	MPC · JPL
554432	2012 TF_{265}	—	October 8, 2012	Haleakala	Pan-STARRS 1	·	2.5 km	MPC · JPL
554433	2012 TU_{265}	—	September 20, 2001	Kitt Peak	Spacewatch	·	2.3 km	MPC · JPL
554434	2012 TP_{266}	—	February 25, 2009	Calar Alto	F. Hormuth	VER	2.2 km	MPC · JPL
554435	2012 TW_{267}	—	September 10, 2004	Kitt Peak	Spacewatch	·	800 m	MPC · JPL
554436	2012 TY_{267}	—	October 9, 2012	Haleakala	Pan-STARRS 1	·	2.2 km	MPC · JPL
554437	2012 TE_{268}	—	October 9, 2012	Haleakala	Pan-STARRS 1	·	1.6 km	MPC · JPL
554438	2012 TK_{273}	—	October 15, 2012	Mount Lemmon	Mount Lemmon Survey	·	2.4 km	MPC · JPL
554439	2012 TM_{273}	—	October 15, 2012	Mount Lemmon	Mount Lemmon Survey	·	2.6 km	MPC · JPL
554440	2012 TV_{273}	—	October 15, 2012	Mount Lemmon	Mount Lemmon Survey	·	2.6 km	MPC · JPL
554441	2012 TW_{281}	—	October 11, 2012	Mount Lemmon	Mount Lemmon Survey	·	2.5 km	MPC · JPL
554442	2012 TZ_{285}	—	October 8, 2012	Kitt Peak	Spacewatch	·	1.3 km	MPC · JPL
554443	2012 TC_{290}	—	September 16, 2012	Mount Lemmon	Mount Lemmon Survey	·	1.1 km	MPC · JPL
554444	2012 TB_{291}	—	October 7, 2012	Haleakala	Pan-STARRS 1	(1338) (FLO)	520 m	MPC · JPL
554445	2012 TE_{291}	—	October 15, 2012	Kitt Peak	Spacewatch	·	3.0 km	MPC · JPL
554446	2012 TY_{292}	—	September 26, 2006	Kitt Peak	Spacewatch	VER	2.5 km	MPC · JPL
554447	2012 TD_{293}	—	October 6, 2012	Kitt Peak	Spacewatch	·	3.0 km	MPC · JPL
554448	2012 TU_{293}	—	October 14, 2012	Kitt Peak	Spacewatch	·	760 m	MPC · JPL
554449	2012 TY_{300}	—	October 7, 2012	Haleakala	Pan-STARRS 1	·	540 m	MPC · JPL
554450	2012 TG_{301}	—	October 7, 2012	Haleakala	Pan-STARRS 1	BRA	1.8 km	MPC · JPL
554451	2012 TF_{302}	—	October 8, 2012	Mount Lemmon	Mount Lemmon Survey	·	2.3 km	MPC · JPL
554452	2012 TH_{302}	—	September 28, 2001	Palomar	NEAT	·	2.9 km	MPC · JPL
554453	2012 TN_{302}	—	September 18, 2012	Kitt Peak	Spacewatch	·	660 m	MPC · JPL
554454	2012 TU_{302}	—	July 30, 2005	Palomar	NEAT	·	570 m	MPC · JPL
554455	2012 TA_{303}	—	November 5, 2007	Kitt Peak	Spacewatch	EOS	1.8 km	MPC · JPL
554456	2012 TG_{304}	—	September 18, 2012	Kitt Peak	Spacewatch	·	2.6 km	MPC · JPL
554457	2012 TD_{305}	—	August 31, 2000	Kitt Peak	Spacewatch	·	3.3 km	MPC · JPL
554458	2012 TQ_{305}	—	September 13, 2002	Palomar	NEAT	·	670 m	MPC · JPL
554459	2012 TE_{310}	—	August 30, 2005	Palomar	NEAT	·	680 m	MPC · JPL
554460	2012 TG_{310}	—	October 11, 2012	Piszkéstető	K. Sárneczky	ARM	4.0 km	MPC · JPL
554461	2012 TL_{315}	—	July 31, 2001	Palomar	NEAT	·	2.6 km	MPC · JPL
554462	2012 TQ_{315}	—	October 22, 2001	Palomar	NEAT	·	2.9 km	MPC · JPL
554463	2012 TF_{318}	—	October 14, 2012	Nogales	M. Schwartz, P. R. Holvorcem	·	2.1 km	MPC · JPL
554464	2012 TH_{318}	—	October 15, 2001	Palomar	NEAT	·	1.1 km	MPC · JPL
554465	2012 TE_{320}	—	February 1, 2009	Kitt Peak	Spacewatch	·	2.3 km	MPC · JPL
554466 Pablomotos	2012 TN_{321}	Pablomotos	December 18, 2007	Costitx	OAM	EUP	4.0 km	MPC · JPL
554467	2012 TW_{321}	—	October 6, 2012	Haleakala	Pan-STARRS 1	EOS	1.9 km	MPC · JPL
554468	2012 TE_{323}	—	October 15, 2012	Haleakala	Pan-STARRS 1	·	2.1 km	MPC · JPL
554469	2012 TQ_{325}	—	October 11, 2012	Haleakala	Pan-STARRS 1	·	650 m	MPC · JPL
554470	2012 TU_{325}	—	December 10, 2009	Mount Lemmon	Mount Lemmon Survey	·	660 m	MPC · JPL
554471	2012 TD_{330}	—	October 14, 2012	Kitt Peak	Spacewatch	·	2.4 km	MPC · JPL
554472	2012 TD_{332}	—	October 7, 2012	Haleakala	Pan-STARRS 1	·	2.1 km	MPC · JPL
554473	2012 TO_{332}	—	September 20, 2006	Catalina	CSS	·	3.2 km	MPC · JPL
554474	2012 TT_{332}	—	October 11, 2012	Kitt Peak	Spacewatch	·	2.7 km	MPC · JPL
554475	2012 TL_{333}	—	July 4, 2017	Haleakala	Pan-STARRS 1	·	2.6 km	MPC · JPL
554476	2012 TF_{334}	—	September 19, 1995	Kitt Peak	Spacewatch	THM	2.3 km	MPC · JPL
554477	2012 TJ_{334}	—	October 7, 2012	Haleakala	Pan-STARRS 1	·	2.5 km	MPC · JPL
554478	2012 TK_{334}	—	October 10, 2012	Mount Lemmon	Mount Lemmon Survey	VER	2.1 km	MPC · JPL
554479	2012 TZ_{334}	—	May 6, 2016	Haleakala	Pan-STARRS 1	·	2.4 km	MPC · JPL
554480	2012 TT_{335}	—	October 15, 2012	Mount Lemmon	Mount Lemmon Survey	EOS	1.5 km	MPC · JPL
554481	2012 TQ_{336}	—	August 30, 2006	Anderson Mesa	LONEOS	·	2.7 km	MPC · JPL
554482	2012 TX_{344}	—	October 7, 2012	Haleakala	Pan-STARRS 1	·	2.2 km	MPC · JPL
554483	2012 TQ_{345}	—	October 10, 2012	Mount Lemmon	Mount Lemmon Survey	URS	2.4 km	MPC · JPL
554484	2012 TF_{350}	—	January 26, 2015	Haleakala	Pan-STARRS 1	EOS	1.5 km	MPC · JPL
554485	2012 TG_{352}	—	April 4, 2016	Haleakala	Pan-STARRS 1	EOS	1.5 km	MPC · JPL
554486	2012 TF_{353}	—	October 9, 2012	Haleakala	Pan-STARRS 1	·	2.0 km	MPC · JPL
554487	2012 TO_{355}	—	April 6, 2011	Mount Lemmon	Mount Lemmon Survey	·	660 m	MPC · JPL
554488	2012 TP_{355}	—	October 12, 2012	Oukaïmeden	C. Rinner	AGN	990 m	MPC · JPL
554489	2012 TF_{357}	—	October 8, 2012	Haleakala	Pan-STARRS 1	·	2.6 km	MPC · JPL
554490	2012 TF_{361}	—	October 15, 2012	Haleakala	Pan-STARRS 1	VER	2.2 km	MPC · JPL
554491	2012 TD_{363}	—	October 8, 2012	Kitt Peak	Spacewatch	H	370 m	MPC · JPL
554492	2012 TM_{365}	—	October 6, 2012	Haleakala	Pan-STARRS 1	·	2.7 km	MPC · JPL
554493	2012 UY_{3}	—	April 9, 2010	Kitt Peak	Spacewatch	·	2.5 km	MPC · JPL
554494	2012 UA_{5}	—	October 16, 2012	Mount Lemmon	Mount Lemmon Survey	·	2.7 km	MPC · JPL
554495	2012 UC_{5}	—	October 16, 2012	Mount Lemmon	Mount Lemmon Survey	VER	2.4 km	MPC · JPL
554496	2012 UE_{5}	—	October 16, 2012	Mount Lemmon	Mount Lemmon Survey	HYG	2.3 km	MPC · JPL
554497	2012 UP_{6}	—	October 7, 2012	Haleakala	Pan-STARRS 1	·	750 m	MPC · JPL
554498	2012 UH_{7}	—	October 7, 2012	Haleakala	Pan-STARRS 1	·	700 m	MPC · JPL
554499	2012 UF_{8}	—	August 26, 2000	Cerro Tololo	Deep Ecliptic Survey	THM	2.1 km	MPC · JPL
554500	2012 UH_{8}	—	October 8, 2012	Haleakala	Pan-STARRS 1	·	2.1 km	MPC · JPL

== 554501–554600 ==
back to top

Designation			Discovery			Properties		Ref
Permanent	Provisional	Named after	Date	Site	Discoverer(s)	Category	Diam.	Ref
554501	2012 UO_{9}	—	October 16, 2012	Mount Lemmon	Mount Lemmon Survey	EOS	1.8 km	MPC · JPL
554502	2012 UA_{14}	—	October 16, 2012	Mount Lemmon	Mount Lemmon Survey	·	440 m	MPC · JPL
554503	2012 UA_{16}	—	October 16, 2012	Mount Lemmon	Mount Lemmon Survey	·	2.3 km	MPC · JPL
554504	2012 UB_{16}	—	February 1, 2009	Mount Lemmon	Mount Lemmon Survey	EOS	1.7 km	MPC · JPL
554505	2012 UX_{20}	—	November 11, 2007	Mount Lemmon	Mount Lemmon Survey	·	1.4 km	MPC · JPL
554506	2012 UA_{22}	—	October 16, 2012	Mount Lemmon	Mount Lemmon Survey	·	2.1 km	MPC · JPL
554507	2012 UU_{22}	—	December 4, 2007	Kitt Peak	Spacewatch	·	2.8 km	MPC · JPL
554508	2012 UD_{23}	—	September 16, 2012	Charleston	R. Holmes	·	2.5 km	MPC · JPL
554509	2012 UJ_{24}	—	October 17, 2012	Mount Lemmon	Mount Lemmon Survey	·	3.2 km	MPC · JPL
554510	2012 UD_{29}	—	August 26, 2012	Haleakala	Pan-STARRS 1	·	580 m	MPC · JPL
554511	2012 UG_{31}	—	October 8, 2012	Kitt Peak	Spacewatch	·	1.5 km	MPC · JPL
554512	2012 US_{31}	—	October 10, 2012	Haleakala	Pan-STARRS 1	·	920 m	MPC · JPL
554513	2012 UW_{32}	—	October 17, 2012	Mount Lemmon	Mount Lemmon Survey	·	3.0 km	MPC · JPL
554514	2012 UX_{34}	—	October 16, 2012	Kitt Peak	Spacewatch	·	2.5 km	MPC · JPL
554515	2012 UF_{35}	—	August 26, 2005	Palomar	NEAT	·	700 m	MPC · JPL
554516	2012 UA_{36}	—	September 12, 2002	Palomar	NEAT	·	640 m	MPC · JPL
554517	2012 UT_{36}	—	October 16, 2012	Kitt Peak	Spacewatch	·	3.3 km	MPC · JPL
554518	2012 UT_{47}	—	October 18, 2012	Haleakala	Pan-STARRS 1	·	2.4 km	MPC · JPL
554519	2012 UP_{48}	—	February 24, 2009	Mount Lemmon	Mount Lemmon Survey	VER	2.4 km	MPC · JPL
554520	2012 UX_{49}	—	May 3, 2006	Kitt Peak	Spacewatch	·	1.3 km	MPC · JPL
554521	2012 UF_{50}	—	October 16, 2012	Kitt Peak	Spacewatch	ULA	4.9 km	MPC · JPL
554522	2012 UR_{53}	—	August 17, 2006	Palomar	NEAT	·	2.6 km	MPC · JPL
554523	2012 UC_{54}	—	December 4, 2007	Kitt Peak	Spacewatch	·	3.1 km	MPC · JPL
554524	2012 UQ_{58}	—	September 21, 2006	Bergisch Gladbach	W. Bickel	VER	2.8 km	MPC · JPL
554525	2012 UR_{67}	—	October 30, 2002	Palomar	NEAT	·	720 m	MPC · JPL
554526	2012 UJ_{69}	—	September 15, 2012	Mount Lemmon	Mount Lemmon Survey	BAP	800 m	MPC · JPL
554527	2012 UL_{69}	—	September 23, 2012	Les Engarouines	L. Bernasconi	·	3.4 km	MPC · JPL
554528	2012 UQ_{70}	—	March 8, 2005	Mount Lemmon	Mount Lemmon Survey	EOS	1.5 km	MPC · JPL
554529	2012 UK_{71}	—	March 29, 2008	Kitt Peak	Spacewatch	·	540 m	MPC · JPL
554530	2012 UK_{73}	—	October 17, 2012	Haleakala	Pan-STARRS 1	·	2.4 km	MPC · JPL
554531	2012 UU_{73}	—	September 25, 2012	Nogales	M. Schwartz, P. R. Holvorcem	·	780 m	MPC · JPL
554532	2012 UP_{74}	—	September 23, 2012	Mount Lemmon	Mount Lemmon Survey	EOS	1.7 km	MPC · JPL
554533	2012 UG_{76}	—	October 18, 2012	Haleakala	Pan-STARRS 1	THM	1.9 km	MPC · JPL
554534	2012 UM_{76}	—	April 14, 2005	Kitt Peak	Spacewatch	·	2.5 km	MPC · JPL
554535	2012 UC_{77}	—	February 1, 2009	Kitt Peak	Spacewatch	·	2.7 km	MPC · JPL
554536	2012 US_{79}	—	October 19, 2012	Haleakala	Pan-STARRS 1	EOS	1.7 km	MPC · JPL
554537	2012 UP_{83}	—	October 20, 2012	Kitt Peak	Spacewatch	·	670 m	MPC · JPL
554538	2012 UE_{84}	—	October 20, 2012	Kitt Peak	Spacewatch	·	3.9 km	MPC · JPL
554539	2012 UU_{84}	—	September 28, 2001	Palomar	NEAT	·	2.5 km	MPC · JPL
554540	2012 UE_{85}	—	December 14, 2003	Palomar	NEAT	DOR	2.4 km	MPC · JPL
554541	2012 UY_{90}	—	September 15, 2012	Kitt Peak	Spacewatch	·	450 m	MPC · JPL
554542	2012 UK_{92}	—	November 11, 2005	Kitt Peak	Spacewatch	PHO	760 m	MPC · JPL
554543	2012 UB_{94}	—	October 7, 2012	Haleakala	Pan-STARRS 1	·	570 m	MPC · JPL
554544	2012 UH_{94}	—	October 17, 2012	Haleakala	Pan-STARRS 1	·	2.5 km	MPC · JPL
554545	2012 UP_{100}	—	October 18, 2012	Haleakala	Pan-STARRS 1	·	2.2 km	MPC · JPL
554546	2012 UL_{101}	—	July 21, 2006	Mount Lemmon	Mount Lemmon Survey	·	1.7 km	MPC · JPL
554547	2012 UL_{104}	—	November 5, 2007	Kitt Peak	Spacewatch	·	3.4 km	MPC · JPL
554548	2012 UN_{104}	—	October 8, 2012	Mayhill-ISON	L. Elenin	·	3.2 km	MPC · JPL
554549	2012 UO_{113}	—	October 22, 2012	Mount Lemmon	Mount Lemmon Survey	EOS	1.7 km	MPC · JPL
554550	2012 UF_{115}	—	October 11, 2012	Haleakala	Pan-STARRS 1	VER	2.3 km	MPC · JPL
554551	2012 UH_{117}	—	October 11, 2012	Haleakala	Pan-STARRS 1	·	2.4 km	MPC · JPL
554552	2012 UO_{125}	—	September 20, 2006	Palomar	NEAT	·	2.6 km	MPC · JPL
554553	2012 UF_{126}	—	August 23, 2011	La Sagra	OAM	TIR	3.4 km	MPC · JPL
554554	2012 UW_{130}	—	September 15, 2012	ASC-Kislovodsk	ASC-Kislovodsk	TIR	2.8 km	MPC · JPL
554555	2012 UJ_{132}	—	August 20, 2001	Palomar	NEAT	TIR	3.7 km	MPC · JPL
554556	2012 UQ_{135}	—	August 27, 2005	Palomar	NEAT	·	650 m	MPC · JPL
554557	2012 UR_{141}	—	September 25, 2006	Kitt Peak	Spacewatch	·	3.0 km	MPC · JPL
554558	2012 UT_{141}	—	August 28, 2012	Mount Lemmon	Mount Lemmon Survey	·	520 m	MPC · JPL
554559	2012 UV_{141}	—	October 8, 2012	Haleakala	Pan-STARRS 1	·	960 m	MPC · JPL
554560	2012 UY_{141}	—	October 8, 2012	Kitt Peak	Spacewatch	·	670 m	MPC · JPL
554561	2012 UK_{144}	—	May 30, 2008	Mount Lemmon	Mount Lemmon Survey	·	1.0 km	MPC · JPL
554562	2012 UR_{144}	—	October 16, 2007	Mount Lemmon	Mount Lemmon Survey	HOF	2.3 km	MPC · JPL
554563	2012 UM_{145}	—	May 12, 2010	Kitt Peak	Spacewatch	VER	2.6 km	MPC · JPL
554564	2012 UE_{147}	—	October 13, 2012	Kitt Peak	Spacewatch	·	610 m	MPC · JPL
554565	2012 US_{147}	—	September 14, 2006	Palomar	NEAT	·	4.3 km	MPC · JPL
554566	2012 UY_{147}	—	October 8, 2012	Kitt Peak	Spacewatch	·	2.3 km	MPC · JPL
554567	2012 UB_{148}	—	October 20, 2012	Haleakala	Pan-STARRS 1	·	640 m	MPC · JPL
554568	2012 UW_{149}	—	May 7, 2010	Mount Lemmon	Mount Lemmon Survey	·	3.7 km	MPC · JPL
554569	2012 UG_{154}	—	October 11, 2012	Haleakala	Pan-STARRS 1	·	2.2 km	MPC · JPL
554570	2012 UW_{154}	—	August 28, 2006	Catalina	CSS	·	2.3 km	MPC · JPL
554571	2012 UU_{155}	—	January 1, 2008	Kitt Peak	Spacewatch	·	3.2 km	MPC · JPL
554572	2012 UF_{156}	—	November 13, 2002	Needville	J. Dellinger	·	810 m	MPC · JPL
554573	2012 UT_{157}	—	October 11, 2006	Palomar	NEAT	·	3.8 km	MPC · JPL
554574	2012 UZ_{158}	—	August 27, 2005	Palomar	NEAT	·	540 m	MPC · JPL
554575	2012 US_{161}	—	October 13, 2012	Kitt Peak	Spacewatch	EOS	1.7 km	MPC · JPL
554576	2012 UV_{165}	—	July 22, 2001	Palomar	NEAT	·	2.2 km	MPC · JPL
554577	2012 UZ_{167}	—	February 11, 2004	Kitt Peak	Spacewatch	EOS	2.5 km	MPC · JPL
554578	2012 UF_{179}	—	October 9, 2012	Mount Lemmon	Mount Lemmon Survey	VER	2.4 km	MPC · JPL
554579	2012 UU_{183}	—	February 26, 2007	Mount Lemmon	Mount Lemmon Survey	·	620 m	MPC · JPL
554580	2012 UC_{184}	—	October 7, 2012	Kitt Peak	Spacewatch	·	590 m	MPC · JPL
554581	2012 UW_{185}	—	August 27, 2001	Kitt Peak	Spacewatch	·	1.9 km	MPC · JPL
554582	2012 UE_{186}	—	October 30, 2008	Kitt Peak	Spacewatch	·	870 m	MPC · JPL
554583	2012 UK_{186}	—	October 9, 2007	Kitt Peak	Spacewatch	·	1.3 km	MPC · JPL
554584	2012 UQ_{186}	—	October 20, 2012	Mount Lemmon	Mount Lemmon Survey	·	1.8 km	MPC · JPL
554585	2012 UT_{186}	—	December 20, 2014	Haleakala	Pan-STARRS 1	·	2.9 km	MPC · JPL
554586	2012 UC_{187}	—	October 22, 2012	Haleakala	Pan-STARRS 1	·	2.9 km	MPC · JPL
554587	2012 UU_{187}	—	August 21, 2006	Kitt Peak	Spacewatch	·	2.1 km	MPC · JPL
554588	2012 UX_{189}	—	October 21, 2012	Haleakala	Pan-STARRS 1	·	560 m	MPC · JPL
554589	2012 UQ_{190}	—	October 17, 2012	Haleakala	Pan-STARRS 1	·	2.5 km	MPC · JPL
554590	2012 UL_{192}	—	October 17, 2012	Haleakala	Pan-STARRS 1	·	2.6 km	MPC · JPL
554591	2012 UC_{195}	—	October 22, 2012	Haleakala	Pan-STARRS 1	V	510 m	MPC · JPL
554592	2012 UH_{195}	—	October 19, 2012	Haleakala	Pan-STARRS 1	·	720 m	MPC · JPL
554593	2012 UZ_{199}	—	October 23, 2012	Haleakala	Pan-STARRS 1	·	3.4 km	MPC · JPL
554594	2012 UU_{202}	—	March 22, 2015	Haleakala	Pan-STARRS 1	·	2.7 km	MPC · JPL
554595	2012 UD_{204}	—	October 22, 2012	Haleakala	Pan-STARRS 1	·	2.3 km	MPC · JPL
554596	2012 UJ_{208}	—	October 22, 2012	Haleakala	Pan-STARRS 1	·	650 m	MPC · JPL
554597	2012 UP_{210}	—	October 18, 2012	Haleakala	Pan-STARRS 1	·	1.9 km	MPC · JPL
554598	2012 US_{210}	—	October 17, 2012	Mount Lemmon	Mount Lemmon Survey	LIX	3.3 km	MPC · JPL
554599	2012 UA_{211}	—	October 18, 2012	Haleakala	Pan-STARRS 1	·	1.4 km	MPC · JPL
554600	2012 UG_{212}	—	October 18, 2012	Haleakala	Pan-STARRS 1	VER	2.1 km	MPC · JPL

== 554601–554700 ==
back to top

Designation			Discovery			Properties		Ref
Permanent	Provisional	Named after	Date	Site	Discoverer(s)	Category	Diam.	Ref
554601	2012 UH_{212}	—	October 17, 2012	Haleakala	Pan-STARRS 1	·	610 m	MPC · JPL
554602	2012 UO_{212}	—	October 20, 2012	Kitt Peak	Spacewatch	·	570 m	MPC · JPL
554603	2012 UD_{214}	—	October 20, 2012	Kitt Peak	Spacewatch	·	2.5 km	MPC · JPL
554604	2012 UU_{216}	—	October 18, 2012	Haleakala	Pan-STARRS 1	VER	2.0 km	MPC · JPL
554605	2012 US_{217}	—	October 17, 2012	Haleakala	Pan-STARRS 1	THM	2.0 km	MPC · JPL
554606	2012 UT_{217}	—	October 19, 2012	Mount Lemmon	Mount Lemmon Survey	·	2.4 km	MPC · JPL
554607	2012 UX_{217}	—	October 14, 2012	Catalina	CSS	·	3.2 km	MPC · JPL
554608	2012 UP_{222}	—	October 21, 2012	Mount Lemmon	Mount Lemmon Survey	EOS	1.6 km	MPC · JPL
554609	2012 UN_{225}	—	October 17, 2012	Haleakala	Pan-STARRS 1	·	2.2 km	MPC · JPL
554610	2012 VK_{2}	—	October 6, 2012	Haleakala	Pan-STARRS 1	·	2.3 km	MPC · JPL
554611	2012 VW_{2}	—	November 2, 2012	Haleakala	Pan-STARRS 1	·	2.5 km	MPC · JPL
554612	2012 VH_{3}	—	October 7, 2005	Mount Lemmon	Mount Lemmon Survey	·	470 m	MPC · JPL
554613	2012 VJ_{4}	—	August 29, 2005	Kitt Peak	Spacewatch	·	790 m	MPC · JPL
554614	2012 VD_{11}	—	March 9, 2007	Mount Lemmon	Mount Lemmon Survey	·	600 m	MPC · JPL
554615	2012 VY_{13}	—	November 4, 2012	Mount Lemmon	Mount Lemmon Survey	EOS	1.7 km	MPC · JPL
554616	2012 VR_{15}	—	October 22, 2012	Kitt Peak	Spacewatch	·	2.4 km	MPC · JPL
554617	2012 VV_{15}	—	February 1, 2003	Palomar	NEAT	·	2.9 km	MPC · JPL
554618	2012 VC_{16}	—	March 16, 2010	Mount Lemmon	Mount Lemmon Survey	·	1.1 km	MPC · JPL
554619	2012 VN_{16}	—	March 20, 2010	Mount Lemmon	Mount Lemmon Survey	·	780 m	MPC · JPL
554620	2012 VH_{20}	—	September 28, 2001	Palomar	NEAT	·	3.5 km	MPC · JPL
554621	2012 VC_{23}	—	November 4, 2012	Mount Lemmon	Mount Lemmon Survey	KOR	1.0 km	MPC · JPL
554622	2012 VX_{23}	—	October 1, 2005	Mount Lemmon	Mount Lemmon Survey	·	560 m	MPC · JPL
554623	2012 VH_{24}	—	August 6, 2005	Palomar	NEAT	·	570 m	MPC · JPL
554624	2012 VQ_{24}	—	October 18, 2012	Haleakala	Pan-STARRS 1	·	490 m	MPC · JPL
554625	2012 VX_{28}	—	September 19, 2012	Mount Lemmon	Mount Lemmon Survey	EOS	1.7 km	MPC · JPL
554626	2012 VJ_{31}	—	November 28, 2005	Kitt Peak	Spacewatch	·	670 m	MPC · JPL
554627	2012 VZ_{31}	—	October 8, 2005	Kitt Peak	Spacewatch	V	430 m	MPC · JPL
554628	2012 VV_{34}	—	October 21, 2012	Haleakala	Pan-STARRS 1	·	2.8 km	MPC · JPL
554629	2012 VF_{36}	—	December 24, 2005	Kitt Peak	Spacewatch	·	910 m	MPC · JPL
554630	2012 VR_{40}	—	September 24, 2011	Mount Lemmon	Mount Lemmon Survey	L5	6.3 km	MPC · JPL
554631	2012 VS_{44}	—	August 20, 2006	Palomar	NEAT	·	2.1 km	MPC · JPL
554632	2012 VO_{51}	—	October 18, 2012	Haleakala	Pan-STARRS 1	·	2.0 km	MPC · JPL
554633	2012 VP_{53}	—	October 14, 2012	Kitt Peak	Spacewatch	·	1.5 km	MPC · JPL
554634	2012 VW_{56}	—	October 8, 2012	Haleakala	Pan-STARRS 1	·	630 m	MPC · JPL
554635	2012 VL_{59}	—	October 21, 2012	Haleakala	Pan-STARRS 1	·	2.4 km	MPC · JPL
554636	2012 VQ_{61}	—	October 21, 2012	Nogales	M. Schwartz, P. R. Holvorcem	·	3.0 km	MPC · JPL
554637	2012 VJ_{62}	—	October 8, 2012	Haleakala	Pan-STARRS 1	·	3.1 km	MPC · JPL
554638	2012 VW_{65}	—	October 24, 2008	Kitt Peak	Spacewatch	EUN	770 m	MPC · JPL
554639	2012 VG_{66}	—	August 17, 2006	Palomar	NEAT	·	2.1 km	MPC · JPL
554640	2012 VK_{68}	—	February 14, 2003	La Silla	Michelsen, R., G. Masi	NYS	850 m	MPC · JPL
554641	2012 VA_{70}	—	October 23, 2001	Palomar	NEAT	·	2.7 km	MPC · JPL
554642	2012 VB_{72}	—	September 3, 2005	Mauna Kea	P. A. Wiegert	·	3.2 km	MPC · JPL
554643	2012 VO_{73}	—	October 21, 2012	Kitt Peak	Spacewatch	VER	2.6 km	MPC · JPL
554644	2012 VA_{74}	—	October 16, 2012	Kitt Peak	Spacewatch	·	2.9 km	MPC · JPL
554645	2012 VB_{74}	—	October 20, 2012	Kitt Peak	Spacewatch	VER	2.3 km	MPC · JPL
554646	2012 VJ_{76}	—	August 26, 2011	Piszkéstető	K. Sárneczky	·	3.0 km	MPC · JPL
554647	2012 VZ_{77}	—	October 20, 2012	Mount Lemmon	Mount Lemmon Survey	·	2.6 km	MPC · JPL
554648 Olaffischer	2012 VB_{78}	Olaffischer	October 20, 2012	Haleakala	Pan-STARRS 1	ERI	1 km	MPC · JPL
554649	2012 VA_{80}	—	May 13, 2005	Kitt Peak	Spacewatch	·	2.6 km	MPC · JPL
554650	2012 VM_{96}	—	October 8, 2012	Kitt Peak	Spacewatch	·	2.7 km	MPC · JPL
554651	2012 VC_{100}	—	November 30, 2005	Kitt Peak	Spacewatch	·	790 m	MPC · JPL
554652	2012 VL_{102}	—	October 14, 2001	Socorro	LINEAR	EOS	1.9 km	MPC · JPL
554653	2012 VH_{103}	—	November 2, 2007	Mount Lemmon	Mount Lemmon Survey	VER	2.6 km	MPC · JPL
554654	2012 VP_{108}	—	September 27, 2006	Catalina	CSS	·	3.1 km	MPC · JPL
554655	2012 VV_{110}	—	November 15, 2012	Elena Remote	Oreshko, A., T. V. Krjačko	·	2.7 km	MPC · JPL
554656	2012 VP_{112}	—	November 29, 2005	Kitt Peak	Spacewatch	·	600 m	MPC · JPL
554657	2012 VG_{118}	—	November 3, 2012	Mount Lemmon	Mount Lemmon Survey	VER	1.9 km	MPC · JPL
554658	2012 VO_{119}	—	February 23, 2015	Haleakala	Pan-STARRS 1	·	2.2 km	MPC · JPL
554659	2012 VQ_{119}	—	March 18, 2015	Haleakala	Pan-STARRS 1	·	2.5 km	MPC · JPL
554660	2012 VY_{121}	—	October 19, 2012	Mount Lemmon	Mount Lemmon Survey	·	750 m	MPC · JPL
554661	2012 VH_{122}	—	October 16, 2012	Mount Lemmon	Mount Lemmon Survey	·	3.0 km	MPC · JPL
554662	2012 VF_{126}	—	November 7, 2012	Haleakala	Pan-STARRS 1	·	2.5 km	MPC · JPL
554663	2012 VZ_{129}	—	November 6, 2012	Mount Lemmon	Mount Lemmon Survey	·	1.3 km	MPC · JPL
554664	2012 VR_{130}	—	November 4, 2012	Haleakala	Pan-STARRS 1	H	480 m	MPC · JPL
554665	2012 WA_{7}	—	October 22, 2012	Haleakala	Pan-STARRS 1	NEM	2.1 km	MPC · JPL
554666	2012 WU_{8}	—	May 20, 2010	Mount Lemmon	Mount Lemmon Survey	·	2.9 km	MPC · JPL
554667	2012 WK_{10}	—	October 22, 2012	Haleakala	Pan-STARRS 1	·	1.6 km	MPC · JPL
554668	2012 WD_{16}	—	December 1, 2005	Kitt Peak	Wasserman, L. H., Millis, R. L.	·	650 m	MPC · JPL
554669	2012 WH_{22}	—	October 27, 2012	Mount Lemmon	Mount Lemmon Survey	·	3.7 km	MPC · JPL
554670	2012 WO_{26}	—	November 7, 2012	Kitt Peak	Spacewatch	·	2.2 km	MPC · JPL
554671	2012 WZ_{33}	—	November 26, 2012	Mount Lemmon	Mount Lemmon Survey	·	570 m	MPC · JPL
554672	2012 WA_{35}	—	October 30, 2005	Mount Lemmon	Mount Lemmon Survey	·	1.0 km	MPC · JPL
554673	2012 WS_{37}	—	November 21, 2012	Les Engarouines	L. Bernasconi	·	750 m	MPC · JPL
554674	2012 WZ_{37}	—	November 26, 2012	Mount Lemmon	Mount Lemmon Survey	·	1.3 km	MPC · JPL
554675	2012 XU_{1}	—	November 13, 2012	ESA OGS	ESA OGS	LUT	3.6 km	MPC · JPL
554676	2012 XY_{5}	—	September 18, 2011	Mount Lemmon	Mount Lemmon Survey	·	2.5 km	MPC · JPL
554677	2012 XG_{9}	—	October 16, 2006	Catalina	CSS	·	4.9 km	MPC · JPL
554678	2012 XL_{9}	—	October 14, 2012	Kitt Peak	Spacewatch	·	2.7 km	MPC · JPL
554679	2012 XL_{11}	—	October 30, 2005	Mount Lemmon	Mount Lemmon Survey	V	430 m	MPC · JPL
554680	2012 XZ_{11}	—	October 22, 2012	Haleakala	Pan-STARRS 1	·	2.0 km	MPC · JPL
554681	2012 XB_{13}	—	October 20, 2012	Kitt Peak	Spacewatch	AGN	980 m	MPC · JPL
554682	2012 XE_{13}	—	November 22, 2012	Kitt Peak	Spacewatch	·	1.3 km	MPC · JPL
554683	2012 XM_{14}	—	November 26, 2012	Mount Lemmon	Mount Lemmon Survey	·	550 m	MPC · JPL
554684	2012 XO_{17}	—	October 23, 2012	Mount Lemmon	Mount Lemmon Survey	·	3.0 km	MPC · JPL
554685	2012 XO_{18}	—	October 28, 2006	Catalina	CSS	·	3.7 km	MPC · JPL
554686	2012 XS_{19}	—	November 4, 2012	Kitt Peak	Spacewatch	·	580 m	MPC · JPL
554687	2012 XA_{20}	—	November 17, 2012	Kitt Peak	Spacewatch	MAS	450 m	MPC · JPL
554688	2012 XF_{22}	—	November 6, 2012	Kitt Peak	Spacewatch	·	3.0 km	MPC · JPL
554689	2012 XJ_{24}	—	December 3, 2012	Mount Lemmon	Mount Lemmon Survey	·	2.5 km	MPC · JPL
554690	2012 XQ_{26}	—	December 3, 2012	Mount Lemmon	Mount Lemmon Survey	·	3.3 km	MPC · JPL
554691	2012 XP_{28}	—	December 3, 2012	Mount Lemmon	Mount Lemmon Survey	VER	2.7 km	MPC · JPL
554692	2012 XD_{32}	—	November 13, 2012	Mount Lemmon	Mount Lemmon Survey	·	2.5 km	MPC · JPL
554693	2012 XQ_{35}	—	December 8, 2005	Kitt Peak	Spacewatch	·	640 m	MPC · JPL
554694	2012 XA_{44}	—	October 10, 2008	Mount Lemmon	Mount Lemmon Survey	·	860 m	MPC · JPL
554695	2012 XL_{48}	—	August 21, 2006	Kitt Peak	Spacewatch	TIR	2.6 km	MPC · JPL
554696	2012 XP_{48}	—	December 5, 2012	Mount Lemmon	Mount Lemmon Survey	·	1.2 km	MPC · JPL
554697	2012 XS_{50}	—	October 8, 2001	Palomar	NEAT	·	2.3 km	MPC · JPL
554698	2012 XF_{57}	—	February 17, 2010	Kitt Peak	Spacewatch	·	600 m	MPC · JPL
554699	2012 XM_{61}	—	September 18, 2011	Mount Lemmon	Mount Lemmon Survey	·	2.6 km	MPC · JPL
554700	2012 XX_{64}	—	April 6, 2010	Bergisch Gladbach	W. Bickel	·	920 m	MPC · JPL

== 554701–554800 ==
back to top

Designation			Discovery			Properties		Ref
Permanent	Provisional	Named after	Date	Site	Discoverer(s)	Category	Diam.	Ref
554701	2012 XG_{66}	—	August 19, 2001	Cerro Tololo	Deep Ecliptic Survey	·	680 m	MPC · JPL
554702	2012 XM_{67}	—	August 5, 2005	Palomar	NEAT	·	690 m	MPC · JPL
554703	2012 XN_{67}	—	September 19, 2011	Mount Lemmon	Mount Lemmon Survey	·	2.8 km	MPC · JPL
554704 Széppataki	2012 XH_{69}	Széppataki	October 23, 2012	Piszkéstető	K. Sárneczky, A. Király	·	2.4 km	MPC · JPL
554705	2012 XW_{70}	—	November 17, 2012	Mount Lemmon	Mount Lemmon Survey	VER	2.3 km	MPC · JPL
554706	2012 XV_{81}	—	December 6, 2012	Mount Lemmon	Mount Lemmon Survey	·	3.9 km	MPC · JPL
554707	2012 XG_{86}	—	December 19, 2007	Mount Lemmon	Mount Lemmon Survey	·	2.9 km	MPC · JPL
554708	2012 XU_{91}	—	October 21, 1995	Kitt Peak	Spacewatch	·	2.3 km	MPC · JPL
554709 Magdastavinschi	2012 XW_{92}	Magdastavinschi	September 17, 2007	Andrushivka	Y. Ivaščenko	·	1.6 km	MPC · JPL
554710	2012 XP_{93}	—	December 16, 2007	Kitt Peak	Spacewatch	·	2.0 km	MPC · JPL
554711	2012 XU_{98}	—	August 31, 2005	Kitt Peak	Spacewatch	·	640 m	MPC · JPL
554712	2012 XC_{101}	—	December 5, 2012	Mount Lemmon	Mount Lemmon Survey	·	2.2 km	MPC · JPL
554713	2012 XS_{106}	—	December 25, 2005	Kitt Peak	Spacewatch	·	770 m	MPC · JPL
554714	2012 XV_{113}	—	December 6, 2012	Nogales	M. Schwartz, P. R. Holvorcem	·	650 m	MPC · JPL
554715	2012 XN_{115}	—	November 20, 2012	Nogales	M. Schwartz, P. R. Holvorcem	·	890 m	MPC · JPL
554716	2012 XZ_{116}	—	September 25, 2011	Haleakala	Pan-STARRS 1	·	3.5 km	MPC · JPL
554717	2012 XJ_{120}	—	December 8, 2012	Kitt Peak	Spacewatch	EUP	3.7 km	MPC · JPL
554718	2012 XE_{122}	—	December 9, 2012	Haleakala	Pan-STARRS 1	·	2.7 km	MPC · JPL
554719	2012 XF_{122}	—	September 18, 2011	Mount Lemmon	Mount Lemmon Survey	·	2.2 km	MPC · JPL
554720	2012 XV_{123}	—	May 13, 2004	Kitt Peak	Spacewatch	EOS	2.0 km	MPC · JPL
554721	2012 XH_{124}	—	August 2, 2000	Kitt Peak	Spacewatch	·	2.7 km	MPC · JPL
554722	2012 XA_{125}	—	December 9, 2012	Haleakala	Pan-STARRS 1	ARM	3.4 km	MPC · JPL
554723	2012 XM_{125}	—	September 25, 2006	Mount Lemmon	Mount Lemmon Survey	·	2.5 km	MPC · JPL
554724	2012 XA_{126}	—	January 11, 2008	Mount Lemmon	Mount Lemmon Survey	·	1.7 km	MPC · JPL
554725	2012 XP_{128}	—	October 19, 2012	Haleakala	Pan-STARRS 1	·	2.5 km	MPC · JPL
554726	2012 XC_{131}	—	October 11, 2006	Palomar	NEAT	·	3.0 km	MPC · JPL
554727	2012 XJ_{138}	—	October 28, 2005	Catalina	CSS	·	630 m	MPC · JPL
554728	2012 XD_{141}	—	December 6, 2005	Kitt Peak	Spacewatch	·	690 m	MPC · JPL
554729	2012 XG_{142}	—	December 6, 2012	Nogales	M. Schwartz, P. R. Holvorcem	H	570 m	MPC · JPL
554730	2012 XK_{142}	—	November 16, 2012	Haleakala	Pan-STARRS 1	·	3.3 km	MPC · JPL
554731	2012 XF_{143}	—	November 12, 2012	Mount Lemmon	Mount Lemmon Survey	·	780 m	MPC · JPL
554732	2012 XU_{147}	—	November 7, 2012	Mount Lemmon	Mount Lemmon Survey	·	2.3 km	MPC · JPL
554733	2012 XO_{148}	—	December 4, 2012	Mount Lemmon	Mount Lemmon Survey	·	690 m	MPC · JPL
554734	2012 XP_{158}	—	December 24, 2006	Gnosca	S. Sposetti	·	2.7 km	MPC · JPL
554735	2012 XZ_{160}	—	December 11, 2012	Mount Lemmon	Mount Lemmon Survey	URS	2.7 km	MPC · JPL
554736	2012 XM_{161}	—	December 4, 2012	Mount Lemmon	Mount Lemmon Survey	VER	2.3 km	MPC · JPL
554737	2012 XL_{162}	—	December 3, 2012	Mount Lemmon	Mount Lemmon Survey	·	880 m	MPC · JPL
554738	2012 YB	—	September 16, 2006	Siding Spring	SSS	·	2.5 km	MPC · JPL
554739	2012 YS_{7}	—	August 16, 2001	Palomar	NEAT	H	550 m	MPC · JPL
554740	2012 YC_{8}	—	March 24, 2003	Apache Point	SDSS Collaboration	H	510 m	MPC · JPL
554741	2012 YE_{17}	—	December 23, 2012	Haleakala	Pan-STARRS 1	V	480 m	MPC · JPL
554742	2012 YZ_{17}	—	December 21, 2012	Mount Lemmon	Mount Lemmon Survey	·	650 m	MPC · JPL
554743	2013 AU_{4}	—	April 6, 2002	Cerro Tololo	Deep Ecliptic Survey	·	820 m	MPC · JPL
554744	2013 AM_{5}	—	November 20, 2006	Mount Lemmon	Mount Lemmon Survey	·	3.7 km	MPC · JPL
554745	2013 AZ_{7}	—	January 3, 2013	Mount Lemmon	Mount Lemmon Survey	·	1.5 km	MPC · JPL
554746	2013 AD_{9}	—	May 25, 2011	Kitt Peak	Spacewatch	H	400 m	MPC · JPL
554747	2013 AG_{10}	—	December 22, 2008	Kitt Peak	Spacewatch	·	1.0 km	MPC · JPL
554748	2013 AZ_{14}	—	December 30, 2007	Kitt Peak	Spacewatch	·	3.0 km	MPC · JPL
554749	2013 AM_{18}	—	January 5, 2013	Mount Lemmon	Mount Lemmon Survey	·	800 m	MPC · JPL
554750	2013 AW_{25}	—	September 24, 2008	Kitt Peak	Spacewatch	·	1.1 km	MPC · JPL
554751	2013 AS_{26}	—	January 5, 2013	Mount Lemmon	Mount Lemmon Survey	·	570 m	MPC · JPL
554752	2013 AM_{41}	—	February 7, 2006	Kitt Peak	Spacewatch	·	750 m	MPC · JPL
554753	2013 AL_{43}	—	October 15, 2004	Anderson Mesa	LONEOS	·	1.3 km	MPC · JPL
554754	2013 AT_{47}	—	January 7, 2013	Kitt Peak	Spacewatch	T_{j} (2.98) · EUP	3.1 km	MPC · JPL
554755	2013 AT_{50}	—	June 2, 2011	Haleakala	Pan-STARRS 1	H	500 m	MPC · JPL
554756	2013 AD_{51}	—	October 24, 1995	Kitt Peak	Spacewatch	·	1.2 km	MPC · JPL
554757	2013 AK_{52}	—	December 22, 2012	Piszkéstető	K. Sárneczky, Hodosan, G.	·	1.2 km	MPC · JPL
554758	2013 AJ_{54}	—	December 18, 2007	Mount Lemmon	Mount Lemmon Survey	·	2.9 km	MPC · JPL
554759	2013 AU_{54}	—	January 11, 1994	Kitt Peak	Spacewatch	·	870 m	MPC · JPL
554760	2013 AV_{67}	—	July 22, 2011	Haleakala	Pan-STARRS 1	H	500 m	MPC · JPL
554761	2013 AD_{68}	—	October 25, 2008	Kitt Peak	Spacewatch	MAS	530 m	MPC · JPL
554762	2013 AF_{84}	—	December 23, 2012	Haleakala	Pan-STARRS 1	·	510 m	MPC · JPL
554763	2013 AJ_{93}	—	December 7, 2012	Mount Lemmon	Mount Lemmon Survey	H	450 m	MPC · JPL
554764	2013 AS_{95}	—	January 4, 2013	Kitt Peak	Spacewatch	·	1.1 km	MPC · JPL
554765	2013 AH_{96}	—	December 7, 2012	ASC-Kislovodsk	Nevski, V.	T_{j} (2.99)	3.6 km	MPC · JPL
554766 Dieterkasan	2013 AC_{97}	Dieterkasan	December 17, 2012	ESA OGS	ESA OGS	·	980 m	MPC · JPL
554767	2013 AO_{99}	—	January 7, 2013	Kitt Peak	Spacewatch	·	890 m	MPC · JPL
554768	2013 AN_{106}	—	January 28, 2006	Mount Lemmon	Mount Lemmon Survey	·	880 m	MPC · JPL
554769	2013 AR_{112}	—	October 7, 2005	Mauna Kea	A. Boattini	·	1.2 km	MPC · JPL
554770	2013 AN_{114}	—	November 19, 2008	Kitt Peak	Spacewatch	·	860 m	MPC · JPL
554771	2013 AR_{120}	—	January 13, 2013	ESA OGS	ESA OGS	·	1.1 km	MPC · JPL
554772	2013 AU_{121}	—	January 13, 2013	Catalina	CSS	·	1.1 km	MPC · JPL
554773	2013 AZ_{127}	—	November 26, 2012	Mount Lemmon	Mount Lemmon Survey	EUP	3.2 km	MPC · JPL
554774	2013 AF_{131}	—	November 26, 2012	Mount Lemmon	Mount Lemmon Survey	·	2.8 km	MPC · JPL
554775	2013 AS_{133}	—	January 11, 2013	Haleakala	Pan-STARRS 1	H	520 m	MPC · JPL
554776	2013 AV_{136}	—	January 10, 2013	Haleakala	Pan-STARRS 1	·	1.2 km	MPC · JPL
554777	2013 AE_{141}	—	October 20, 2012	Mount Lemmon	Mount Lemmon Survey	H	460 m	MPC · JPL
554778	2013 AD_{176}	—	January 13, 2013	Nogales	M. Schwartz, P. R. Holvorcem	PHO	660 m	MPC · JPL
554779	2013 AH_{178}	—	September 28, 2011	Kitt Peak	Spacewatch	·	2.2 km	MPC · JPL
554780	2013 AQ_{183}	—	January 10, 2013	Haleakala	Pan-STARRS 1	cubewano (cold)	147 km	MPC · JPL
554781	2013 AH_{184}	—	January 5, 2013	Kitt Peak	Spacewatch	·	2.8 km	MPC · JPL
554782	2013 AB_{187}	—	January 10, 2013	Haleakala	Pan-STARRS 1	SYL	3.2 km	MPC · JPL
554783	2013 AC_{189}	—	January 10, 2013	Haleakala	Pan-STARRS 1	·	1.0 km	MPC · JPL
554784	2013 AG_{189}	—	September 6, 2015	Haleakala	Pan-STARRS 1	PHO	750 m	MPC · JPL
554785	2013 AA_{190}	—	January 10, 2013	Mount Lemmon	Mount Lemmon Survey	PHO	710 m	MPC · JPL
554786	2013 AO_{191}	—	January 13, 2013	Catalina	CSS	H	480 m	MPC · JPL
554787	2013 AD_{202}	—	January 14, 2013	Mount Lemmon	Mount Lemmon Survey	H	340 m	MPC · JPL
554788	2013 BC_{13}	—	December 5, 2005	Goodricke-Pigott	R. A. Tucker	·	620 m	MPC · JPL
554789	2013 BV_{14}	—	January 17, 2013	Haleakala	Pan-STARRS 1	·	1.5 km	MPC · JPL
554790	2013 BR_{19}	—	October 1, 2011	Kitt Peak	Spacewatch	·	860 m	MPC · JPL
554791	2013 BZ_{24}	—	January 8, 2013	Kitt Peak	Spacewatch	·	1.9 km	MPC · JPL
554792	2013 BT_{29}	—	January 16, 2013	Haleakala	Pan-STARRS 1	·	930 m	MPC · JPL
554793	2013 BM_{30}	—	September 17, 2006	Kitt Peak	Spacewatch	KOR	1.2 km	MPC · JPL
554794	2013 BO_{34}	—	January 17, 2013	Haleakala	Pan-STARRS 1	·	2.3 km	MPC · JPL
554795	2013 BQ_{44}	—	October 28, 2008	Kitt Peak	Spacewatch	·	740 m	MPC · JPL
554796	2013 BR_{49}	—	March 23, 2006	Kitt Peak	Spacewatch	MAS	500 m	MPC · JPL
554797	2013 BA_{54}	—	July 13, 2001	Palomar	NEAT	·	800 m	MPC · JPL
554798	2013 BW_{58}	—	March 23, 2006	Kitt Peak	Spacewatch	·	910 m	MPC · JPL
554799	2013 BQ_{63}	—	September 4, 2004	Palomar	NEAT	·	1.3 km	MPC · JPL
554800	2013 BK_{65}	—	January 10, 2013	Kitt Peak	Spacewatch	·	970 m	MPC · JPL

== 554801–554900 ==
back to top

Designation			Discovery			Properties		Ref
Permanent	Provisional	Named after	Date	Site	Discoverer(s)	Category	Diam.	Ref
554801	2013 BS_{67}	—	May 7, 2008	Kitt Peak	Spacewatch	·	3.9 km	MPC · JPL
554802	2013 BN_{70}	—	January 19, 2013	Kitt Peak	Spacewatch	·	1.3 km	MPC · JPL
554803	2013 BN_{78}	—	January 31, 2013	Kitt Peak	Spacewatch	·	1.0 km	MPC · JPL
554804	2013 BU_{84}	—	January 17, 2013	Kitt Peak	Spacewatch	·	1.0 km	MPC · JPL
554805	2013 BL_{95}	—	January 17, 2013	Haleakala	Pan-STARRS 1	·	2.5 km	MPC · JPL
554806	2013 BG_{97}	—	January 17, 2013	Mount Lemmon	Mount Lemmon Survey	·	1.2 km	MPC · JPL
554807	2013 BP_{98}	—	January 16, 2013	Mount Lemmon	Mount Lemmon Survey	·	980 m	MPC · JPL
554808	2013 CO_{3}	—	January 10, 2013	Kitt Peak	Spacewatch	·	970 m	MPC · JPL
554809	2013 CU_{6}	—	July 28, 2011	Haleakala	Pan-STARRS 1	DOR	1.7 km	MPC · JPL
554810	2013 CF_{13}	—	February 1, 2013	Kitt Peak	Spacewatch	·	930 m	MPC · JPL
554811	2013 CG_{27}	—	February 3, 2013	Haleakala	Pan-STARRS 1	·	1.8 km	MPC · JPL
554812	2013 CS_{27}	—	March 24, 2006	Kitt Peak	Spacewatch	MAS	470 m	MPC · JPL
554813	2013 CS_{33}	—	December 3, 2005	Mauna Kea	A. Boattini	·	1.3 km	MPC · JPL
554814	2013 CJ_{39}	—	February 19, 2009	Kitt Peak	Spacewatch	·	1.6 km	MPC · JPL
554815	2013 CU_{40}	—	January 17, 2013	Catalina	CSS	H	450 m	MPC · JPL
554816	2013 CT_{49}	—	February 6, 2013	Nogales	M. Schwartz, P. R. Holvorcem	·	1.0 km	MPC · JPL
554817	2013 CZ_{49}	—	February 19, 2009	Catalina	CSS	·	690 m	MPC · JPL
554818	2013 CM_{54}	—	January 9, 2013	Kitt Peak	Spacewatch	H	380 m	MPC · JPL
554819	2013 CN_{57}	—	February 9, 2013	Oukaïmeden	C. Rinner	·	870 m	MPC · JPL
554820	2013 CJ_{58}	—	March 4, 2005	Mount Lemmon	Mount Lemmon Survey	H	390 m	MPC · JPL
554821	2013 CE_{62}	—	February 2, 2013	Haleakala	Pan-STARRS 1	BAR	970 m	MPC · JPL
554822	2013 CG_{62}	—	August 28, 2011	Haleakala	Pan-STARRS 1	·	1.2 km	MPC · JPL
554823	2013 CL_{63}	—	September 3, 2000	Apache Point	SDSS Collaboration	·	1.1 km	MPC · JPL
554824	2013 CO_{63}	—	February 8, 2013	Haleakala	Pan-STARRS 1	EUP	2.6 km	MPC · JPL
554825	2013 CG_{64}	—	February 6, 2013	Nogales	M. Schwartz, P. R. Holvorcem	H	400 m	MPC · JPL
554826	2013 CP_{67}	—	February 8, 2013	Haleakala	Pan-STARRS 1	·	970 m	MPC · JPL
554827	2013 CG_{69}	—	October 24, 2001	Palomar	NEAT	·	910 m	MPC · JPL
554828	2013 CY_{73}	—	December 4, 2008	Kitt Peak	Spacewatch	·	1.0 km	MPC · JPL
554829	2013 CN_{93}	—	August 27, 2011	Dauban	C. Rinner, Kugel, F.	·	1.0 km	MPC · JPL
554830	2013 CE_{94}	—	January 17, 2013	Kitt Peak	Spacewatch	MAS	520 m	MPC · JPL
554831	2013 CP_{99}	—	February 8, 2013	Haleakala	Pan-STARRS 1	·	2.7 km	MPC · JPL
554832	2013 CX_{112}	—	February 6, 2002	Kitt Peak	Deep Ecliptic Survey	NYS	990 m	MPC · JPL
554833	2013 CS_{113}	—	October 16, 2007	Mount Lemmon	Mount Lemmon Survey	·	1.0 km	MPC · JPL
554834	2013 CP_{121}	—	February 8, 2013	Haleakala	Pan-STARRS 1	KOR	1.1 km	MPC · JPL
554835	2013 CB_{123}	—	February 10, 2013	Nogales	M. Schwartz, P. R. Holvorcem	EUN	930 m	MPC · JPL
554836	2013 CD_{129}	—	February 13, 2013	Haleakala	Pan-STARRS 1	H	450 m	MPC · JPL
554837	2013 CF_{136}	—	February 7, 2013	Catalina	CSS	·	1.1 km	MPC · JPL
554838	2013 CQ_{139}	—	January 20, 2013	Mount Lemmon	Mount Lemmon Survey	·	1.1 km	MPC · JPL
554839	2013 CW_{139}	—	February 14, 2013	Kitt Peak	Spacewatch	L4 · ERY	7.4 km	MPC · JPL
554840	2013 CR_{143}	—	February 14, 2013	Kitt Peak	Spacewatch	NYS	980 m	MPC · JPL
554841	2013 CD_{145}	—	March 3, 2006	Kitt Peak	Spacewatch	·	830 m	MPC · JPL
554842	2013 CM_{146}	—	January 3, 2009	Kitt Peak	Spacewatch	MAS	460 m	MPC · JPL
554843	2013 CP_{148}	—	February 14, 2013	Kitt Peak	Spacewatch	·	3.9 km	MPC · JPL
554844	2013 CX_{153}	—	May 24, 2006	Palomar	NEAT	NYS	1.2 km	MPC · JPL
554845	2013 CU_{155}	—	March 27, 2008	Mount Lemmon	Mount Lemmon Survey	·	1.5 km	MPC · JPL
554846	2013 CT_{156}	—	February 5, 2013	Kitt Peak	Spacewatch	·	810 m	MPC · JPL
554847	2013 CJ_{160}	—	February 14, 2013	Haleakala	Pan-STARRS 1	·	950 m	MPC · JPL
554848	2013 CS_{180}	—	January 20, 2013	Kitt Peak	Spacewatch	·	1.3 km	MPC · JPL
554849	2013 CF_{182}	—	February 15, 2013	Haleakala	Pan-STARRS 1	HNS	1.2 km	MPC · JPL
554850	2013 CQ_{182}	—	January 19, 2013	Kitt Peak	Spacewatch	·	950 m	MPC · JPL
554851	2013 CG_{183}	—	January 14, 2013	Mount Lemmon	Mount Lemmon Survey	·	1.6 km	MPC · JPL
554852	2013 CB_{187}	—	August 23, 2003	Palomar	NEAT	(5)	1.2 km	MPC · JPL
554853	2013 CJ_{206}	—	June 15, 2010	Mount Lemmon	Mount Lemmon Survey	·	2.8 km	MPC · JPL
554854	2013 CW_{221}	—	February 5, 2013	Mount Lemmon	Mount Lemmon Survey	·	1.5 km	MPC · JPL
554855	2013 CH_{228}	—	February 15, 2013	Haleakala	Pan-STARRS 1	·	970 m	MPC · JPL
554856	2013 CF_{229}	—	February 3, 2013	Haleakala	Pan-STARRS 1	twotino	221 km	MPC · JPL
554857	2013 CV_{229}	—	September 30, 2016	Haleakala	Pan-STARRS 1	·	1.9 km	MPC · JPL
554858	2013 CK_{230}	—	February 3, 2013	Haleakala	Pan-STARRS 1	·	870 m	MPC · JPL
554859	2013 CP_{230}	—	February 28, 2014	Haleakala	Pan-STARRS 1	SYL	3.2 km	MPC · JPL
554860	2013 CH_{232}	—	February 9, 2013	Haleakala	Pan-STARRS 1	·	970 m	MPC · JPL
554861	2013 CZ_{237}	—	October 15, 2015	Haleakala	Pan-STARRS 1	·	900 m	MPC · JPL
554862	2013 CK_{239}	—	February 15, 2013	Haleakala	Pan-STARRS 1	·	880 m	MPC · JPL
554863	2013 CL_{245}	—	February 9, 2013	Haleakala	Pan-STARRS 1	·	1.4 km	MPC · JPL
554864	2013 CK_{247}	—	February 14, 2013	Haleakala	Pan-STARRS 1	·	1.7 km	MPC · JPL
554865	2013 CT_{247}	—	February 5, 2013	Mount Lemmon	Mount Lemmon Survey	·	980 m	MPC · JPL
554866	2013 CD_{249}	—	February 13, 2013	Haleakala	Pan-STARRS 1	H	380 m	MPC · JPL
554867	2013 DZ_{13}	—	October 24, 2008	Kitt Peak	Spacewatch	·	610 m	MPC · JPL
554868	2013 DV_{18}	—	February 16, 2013	Mount Lemmon	Mount Lemmon Survey	·	950 m	MPC · JPL
554869	2013 EJ	—	September 15, 2009	Kitt Peak	Spacewatch	H	450 m	MPC · JPL
554870	2013 EZ_{2}	—	March 10, 2008	Kitt Peak	Spacewatch	H	420 m	MPC · JPL
554871	2013 EJ_{10}	—	March 4, 2013	Haleakala	Pan-STARRS 1	·	1.3 km	MPC · JPL
554872	2013 EC_{16}	—	December 29, 2008	Mount Lemmon	Mount Lemmon Survey	·	870 m	MPC · JPL
554873	2013 EV_{18}	—	September 23, 2011	Kitt Peak	Spacewatch	·	990 m	MPC · JPL
554874	2013 EU_{26}	—	March 7, 2013	Mount Lemmon	Mount Lemmon Survey	·	2.4 km	MPC · JPL
554875	2013 EA_{28}	—	March 6, 2013	Haleakala	Pan-STARRS 1	H	440 m	MPC · JPL
554876	2013 EE_{33}	—	January 18, 2013	Mount Lemmon	Mount Lemmon Survey	BAR	1.1 km	MPC · JPL
554877	2013 EX_{34}	—	February 1, 2009	Kitt Peak	Spacewatch	NYS	940 m	MPC · JPL
554878	2013 ES_{39}	—	January 17, 2009	Kitt Peak	Spacewatch	·	1.0 km	MPC · JPL
554879 Kissgyula	2013 EA_{49}	Kissgyula	October 2, 2011	Piszkéstető	K. Sárneczky, T. Szalai	PHO	970 m	MPC · JPL
554880	2013 EL_{49}	—	January 25, 2009	Kitt Peak	Spacewatch	NYS	780 m	MPC · JPL
554881	2013 EG_{54}	—	September 20, 2011	Kitt Peak	Spacewatch	·	1.1 km	MPC · JPL
554882	2013 EK_{60}	—	March 6, 2006	Kitt Peak	Spacewatch	·	680 m	MPC · JPL
554883	2013 EC_{72}	—	October 22, 2003	Kitt Peak	Spacewatch	·	1.1 km	MPC · JPL
554884	2013 ES_{80}	—	February 1, 2009	Kitt Peak	Spacewatch	·	1.2 km	MPC · JPL
554885	2013 EE_{89}	—	February 7, 2013	Catalina	CSS	H	550 m	MPC · JPL
554886	2013 EB_{91}	—	March 3, 2013	Nogales	M. Schwartz, P. R. Holvorcem	·	1.5 km	MPC · JPL
554887	2013 EN_{91}	—	September 15, 2002	Palomar	NEAT	MAR	1.2 km	MPC · JPL
554888	2013 EO_{91}	—	September 12, 2002	Palomar	NEAT	·	1.5 km	MPC · JPL
554889	2013 EP_{95}	—	March 8, 2013	Haleakala	Pan-STARRS 1	·	860 m	MPC · JPL
554890	2013 EB_{100}	—	September 30, 2010	Mount Lemmon	Mount Lemmon Survey	·	2.0 km	MPC · JPL
554891	2013 ES_{100}	—	September 21, 2011	Mount Lemmon	Mount Lemmon Survey	·	970 m	MPC · JPL
554892	2013 ER_{101}	—	March 10, 2013	La Silla	La Silla	·	1.1 km	MPC · JPL
554893	2013 EB_{102}	—	March 11, 2013	Kitt Peak	Spacewatch	·	1.4 km	MPC · JPL
554894	2013 EE_{104}	—	March 15, 2013	Palomar	Palomar Transient Factory	H	550 m	MPC · JPL
554895	2013 EQ_{140}	—	February 5, 2013	Mount Lemmon	Mount Lemmon Survey	L4	6.4 km	MPC · JPL
554896	2013 EE_{156}	—	March 12, 2013	Mount Lemmon	Mount Lemmon Survey	·	870 m	MPC · JPL
554897	2013 EF_{164}	—	March 11, 2013	Mount Lemmon	Mount Lemmon Survey	·	900 m	MPC · JPL
554898	2013 EF_{167}	—	March 13, 2013	Haleakala	Pan-STARRS 1	3:2	4.7 km	MPC · JPL
554899	2013 EQ_{167}	—	September 4, 2011	Haleakala	Pan-STARRS 1	·	760 m	MPC · JPL
554900	2013 EC_{170}	—	March 5, 2013	Mount Lemmon	Mount Lemmon Survey	·	1.1 km	MPC · JPL

== 554901–555000 ==
back to top

Designation			Discovery			Properties		Ref
Permanent	Provisional	Named after	Date	Site	Discoverer(s)	Category	Diam.	Ref
554901	2013 EQ_{172}	—	March 12, 2013	Kitt Peak	Research and Education Collaborative Occultation Network	·	920 m	MPC · JPL
554902	2013 EY_{172}	—	March 4, 2013	Haleakala	Pan-STARRS 1	HOF	1.9 km	MPC · JPL
554903	2013 EW_{174}	—	October 18, 2009	Mount Lemmon	Mount Lemmon Survey	L4	6.3 km	MPC · JPL
554904	2013 EX_{174}	—	March 14, 2013	Palomar	Palomar Transient Factory	H	390 m	MPC · JPL
554905	2013 FE_{4}	—	March 12, 2013	Kitt Peak	Spacewatch	H	370 m	MPC · JPL
554906	2013 FU_{9}	—	October 31, 2011	Mount Lemmon	Mount Lemmon Survey	·	750 m	MPC · JPL
554907	2013 FW_{10}	—	March 15, 2002	Kitt Peak	Spacewatch	PHO	950 m	MPC · JPL
554908	2013 FJ_{15}	—	March 3, 2013	Kitt Peak	Spacewatch	H	410 m	MPC · JPL
554909	2013 FH_{18}	—	March 10, 2004	Catalina	CSS	·	2.6 km	MPC · JPL
554910	2013 FZ_{18}	—	January 13, 2013	Mount Lemmon	Mount Lemmon Survey	H	480 m	MPC · JPL
554911	2013 FS_{26}	—	March 19, 2013	Haleakala	Pan-STARRS 1	·	2.1 km	MPC · JPL
554912	2013 FV_{28}	—	September 17, 2006	Kitt Peak	Spacewatch	H	360 m	MPC · JPL
554913	2013 FY_{34}	—	March 18, 2013	Mount Lemmon	Mount Lemmon Survey	·	890 m	MPC · JPL
554914	2013 GN_{1}	—	March 18, 2009	Mount Lemmon	Mount Lemmon Survey	·	1.1 km	MPC · JPL
554915	2013 GF_{5}	—	January 25, 2009	Kitt Peak	Spacewatch	·	930 m	MPC · JPL
554916	2013 GW_{5}	—	February 5, 2009	Kitt Peak	Spacewatch	·	780 m	MPC · JPL
554917	2013 GZ_{11}	—	October 22, 2003	Apache Point	SDSS Collaboration	PHO	1.2 km	MPC · JPL
554918	2013 GL_{12}	—	April 3, 2013	Palomar	Palomar Transient Factory	HNS	1.4 km	MPC · JPL
554919	2013 GM_{12}	—	April 3, 2013	Palomar	Palomar Transient Factory	H	520 m	MPC · JPL
554920	2013 GF_{21}	—	April 5, 2013	Palomar	Palomar Transient Factory	H	450 m	MPC · JPL
554921	2013 GJ_{23}	—	April 2, 2013	Mount Lemmon	Mount Lemmon Survey	H	360 m	MPC · JPL
554922	2013 GA_{32}	—	August 22, 2007	Kitt Peak	Spacewatch	3:2	4.6 km	MPC · JPL
554923	2013 GK_{41}	—	November 1, 2011	Mount Lemmon	Mount Lemmon Survey	·	880 m	MPC · JPL
554924	2013 GG_{42}	—	March 16, 2013	Kitt Peak	Spacewatch	·	1.4 km	MPC · JPL
554925	2013 GH_{50}	—	April 8, 2013	Kitt Peak	Spacewatch	·	2.0 km	MPC · JPL
554926	2013 GL_{59}	—	April 4, 2005	Mount Lemmon	Mount Lemmon Survey	3:2	4.1 km	MPC · JPL
554927	2013 GQ_{67}	—	March 5, 2013	Mount Lemmon	Mount Lemmon Survey	·	1.5 km	MPC · JPL
554928	2013 GJ_{73}	—	January 28, 2004	Kitt Peak	Spacewatch	·	1.9 km	MPC · JPL
554929	2013 GC_{80}	—	April 12, 2013	Haleakala	Pan-STARRS 1	H	340 m	MPC · JPL
554930	2013 GV_{83}	—	November 24, 2002	Palomar	NEAT	·	1.8 km	MPC · JPL
554931	2013 GK_{85}	—	March 8, 2005	Catalina	CSS	PHO	1.1 km	MPC · JPL
554932	2013 GD_{88}	—	October 20, 2003	Kitt Peak	Spacewatch	·	1.4 km	MPC · JPL
554933	2013 GP_{91}	—	March 13, 2013	Catalina	CSS	·	1.6 km	MPC · JPL
554934	2013 GO_{92}	—	March 17, 2013	Mount Lemmon	Mount Lemmon Survey	·	1.6 km	MPC · JPL
554935	2013 GF_{102}	—	August 17, 2006	Palomar	NEAT	·	1.0 km	MPC · JPL
554936	2013 GA_{107}	—	March 29, 2009	Kitt Peak	Spacewatch	·	1.0 km	MPC · JPL
554937	2013 GE_{115}	—	April 3, 2013	Palomar	Palomar Transient Factory	H	470 m	MPC · JPL
554938	2013 GM_{125}	—	April 11, 2013	Kitt Peak	Spacewatch	H	460 m	MPC · JPL
554939	2013 GT_{128}	—	March 5, 2002	Apache Point	SDSS Collaboration	·	1.2 km	MPC · JPL
554940	2013 GA_{129}	—	November 6, 2005	Catalina	CSS	·	3.8 km	MPC · JPL
554941	2013 GK_{135}	—	April 13, 2013	Haleakala	Pan-STARRS 1	TIR	2.1 km	MPC · JPL
554942	2013 GZ_{138}	—	September 18, 2010	Mount Lemmon	Mount Lemmon Survey	·	1.4 km	MPC · JPL
554943	2013 GQ_{141}	—	April 12, 2013	Haleakala	Pan-STARRS 1	GEF	900 m	MPC · JPL
554944	2013 GL_{143}	—	April 11, 2013	Mount Lemmon	Mount Lemmon Survey	·	1.2 km	MPC · JPL
554945	2013 GP_{144}	—	April 11, 2013	ESA OGS	ESA OGS	H	480 m	MPC · JPL
554946	2013 GD_{150}	—	December 4, 2015	Mount Lemmon	Mount Lemmon Survey	·	720 m	MPC · JPL
554947	2013 GT_{153}	—	April 10, 2013	Haleakala	Pan-STARRS 1	·	550 m	MPC · JPL
554948	2013 GN_{155}	—	April 3, 2013	Palomar	Palomar Transient Factory	·	3.0 km	MPC · JPL
554949	2013 GW_{155}	—	April 7, 2013	Mount Lemmon	Mount Lemmon Survey	·	460 m	MPC · JPL
554950	2013 GX_{155}	—	April 10, 2013	Haleakala	Pan-STARRS 1	·	1.9 km	MPC · JPL
554951	2013 HL_{25}	—	April 11, 2013	Palomar	Palomar Transient Factory	H	550 m	MPC · JPL
554952	2013 HC_{46}	—	April 9, 2013	Haleakala	Pan-STARRS 1	·	530 m	MPC · JPL
554953	2013 HR_{46}	—	October 23, 2011	Kitt Peak	Spacewatch	·	720 m	MPC · JPL
554954	2013 HC_{50}	—	November 19, 2006	Kitt Peak	Spacewatch	·	1.8 km	MPC · JPL
554955	2013 HO_{59}	—	April 16, 2013	Cerro Tololo-DECam	DECam	·	1.4 km	MPC · JPL
554956	2013 HA_{64}	—	April 9, 2013	Haleakala	Pan-STARRS 1	EUN	1 km	MPC · JPL
554957	2013 HZ_{77}	—	April 9, 2013	Haleakala	Pan-STARRS 1	PHO	760 m	MPC · JPL
554958	2013 HY_{81}	—	October 21, 2003	Kitt Peak	Spacewatch	V	590 m	MPC · JPL
554959 Lasica	2013 HW_{82}	Lasica	December 4, 2010	Piszkéstető	S. Kürti, K. Sárneczky	·	1.4 km	MPC · JPL
554960	2013 HX_{91}	—	October 3, 2002	Palomar	NEAT	·	1.7 km	MPC · JPL
554961	2013 HD_{107}	—	March 15, 2013	Kitt Peak	Spacewatch	3:2 · SHU	4.0 km	MPC · JPL
554962	2013 HM_{108}	—	November 19, 2007	Kitt Peak	Spacewatch	·	730 m	MPC · JPL
554963	2013 HW_{111}	—	April 16, 2013	Cerro Tololo-DECam	DECam	·	720 m	MPC · JPL
554964	2013 HH_{118}	—	August 29, 2006	Kitt Peak	Spacewatch	·	1.1 km	MPC · JPL
554965	2013 HE_{132}	—	October 1, 2011	Kitt Peak	Spacewatch	·	1.1 km	MPC · JPL
554966	2013 HR_{145}	—	April 9, 2013	Haleakala	Pan-STARRS 1	·	1.3 km	MPC · JPL
554967	2013 HH_{148}	—	April 6, 2005	Mount Lemmon	Mount Lemmon Survey	3:2	4.7 km	MPC · JPL
554968	2013 HR_{148}	—	October 10, 2010	Kitt Peak	Spacewatch	·	880 m	MPC · JPL
554969	2013 HT_{148}	—	October 26, 2011	Haleakala	Pan-STARRS 1	·	1.0 km	MPC · JPL
554970	2013 JL_{1}	—	April 10, 2013	Haleakala	Pan-STARRS 1	·	1.1 km	MPC · JPL
554971	2013 JR_{2}	—	May 3, 2013	Haleakala	Pan-STARRS 1	H	510 m	MPC · JPL
554972	2013 JW_{2}	—	January 9, 2000	Kitt Peak	Spacewatch	·	1.3 km	MPC · JPL
554973	2013 JN_{4}	—	October 31, 2006	Mount Lemmon	Mount Lemmon Survey	H	380 m	MPC · JPL
554974	2013 JR_{8}	—	May 5, 2013	Haleakala	Pan-STARRS 1	·	1.1 km	MPC · JPL
554975	2013 JK_{17}	—	September 27, 2011	Haleakala	Pan-STARRS 1	H	420 m	MPC · JPL
554976	2013 JA_{24}	—	May 15, 2005	Mount Lemmon	Mount Lemmon Survey	·	940 m	MPC · JPL
554977	2013 JX_{33}	—	April 19, 2013	Haleakala	Pan-STARRS 1	·	1.4 km	MPC · JPL
554978	2013 JE_{38}	—	May 10, 2013	Kitt Peak	Spacewatch	·	920 m	MPC · JPL
554979 Michaelmazur	2013 JN_{46}	Michaelmazur	April 26, 2004	Mauna Kea	P. A. Wiegert, D. D. Balam	·	1.3 km	MPC · JPL
554980	2013 JE_{51}	—	June 13, 2005	Kitt Peak	Spacewatch	·	1.1 km	MPC · JPL
554981	2013 JH_{56}	—	April 15, 2013	Haleakala	Pan-STARRS 1	·	1 km	MPC · JPL
554982	2013 JV_{65}	—	May 5, 2013	Haleakala	Pan-STARRS 1	cubewano (cold)	185 km	MPC · JPL
554983	2013 JZ_{67}	—	August 28, 2014	Haleakala	Pan-STARRS 1	·	780 m	MPC · JPL
554984	2013 JE_{68}	—	May 12, 2013	Mount Lemmon	Mount Lemmon Survey	·	1.5 km	MPC · JPL
554985	2013 JR_{73}	—	December 7, 2015	Haleakala	Pan-STARRS 1	·	1.0 km	MPC · JPL
554986	2013 JQ_{76}	—	May 3, 2013	Haleakala	Pan-STARRS 1	·	470 m	MPC · JPL
554987	2013 JW_{77}	—	September 15, 2009	Siding Spring	SSS	·	2.1 km	MPC · JPL
554988	2013 KG_{2}	—	May 16, 2013	Kitt Peak	Spacewatch	·	1.5 km	MPC · JPL
554989	2013 KB_{3}	—	May 20, 2013	Palomar	Palomar Transient Factory	H	450 m	MPC · JPL
554990	2013 KK_{9}	—	November 16, 2006	Mount Lemmon	Mount Lemmon Survey	·	1.2 km	MPC · JPL
554991	2013 KB_{10}	—	November 21, 2006	Mount Lemmon	Mount Lemmon Survey	·	1.5 km	MPC · JPL
554992	2013 KW_{14}	—	May 2, 2013	Mount Lemmon	Mount Lemmon Survey	·	1.5 km	MPC · JPL
554993	2013 KK_{16}	—	April 15, 2013	Haleakala	Pan-STARRS 1	·	1.3 km	MPC · JPL
554994	2013 KC_{19}	—	September 17, 2003	Kitt Peak	Spacewatch	·	2.9 km	MPC · JPL
554995	2013 KT_{19}	—	May 16, 2013	Haleakala	Pan-STARRS 1	·	1.1 km	MPC · JPL
554996	2013 LV_{2}	—	August 18, 2001	Palomar	NEAT	·	1.5 km	MPC · JPL
554997	2013 LY_{7}	—	November 10, 2010	Mount Lemmon	Mount Lemmon Survey	GEF	1.1 km	MPC · JPL
554998	2013 LF_{10}	—	June 4, 2013	Mount Lemmon	Mount Lemmon Survey	·	2.2 km	MPC · JPL
554999	2013 LG_{12}	—	June 5, 2013	Kitt Peak	Spacewatch	·	1.8 km	MPC · JPL
555000	2013 LJ_{15}	—	June 6, 2013	Mount Lemmon	Mount Lemmon Survey	EUN	900 m	MPC · JPL

back to top

== Meaning of names ==
As minor planet discoveries are confirmed, they are given a permanent number by the IAU's Minor Planet Center (MPC), and the discoverers can then submit names for them, following the IAU's naming conventions. The list below concerns those minor planets in the specified number-range that have received names, and explains the meanings of those names.

Official naming citations of newly named small Solar System bodies are approved and published in a bulletin by IAU's Working Group for Small Bodies Nomenclature (WGSBN). Before May 2021, citations were published in MPC's Minor Planet Circulars for many decades. Recent citations can also be found on the JPL Small-Body Database (SBDB). Until his death in 2016, German astronomer Lutz D. Schmadel compiled these citations into the Dictionary of Minor Planet Names (DMP) and regularly updated the collection.

Based on Paul Herget's The Names of the Minor Planets, Schmadel also researched the unclear origin of numerous asteroids, most of which had been named prior to World War II. This article incorporates text from this source, which is in the public domain: SBDB New namings may only be added to this list below after official publication as the preannouncement of names is condemned. The WGSBN publishes a comprehensive guideline for the naming rules of non-cometary small Solar System bodies.

Named minor planet	Provisional	This minor planet was named for...	Ref · Catalog
554239 Montseypedro	2012 SV_{26}	Montserrat Loredo (b. 1959) and Pedro Villanueva (b. 1958) are Spanish artisans. Montse creates leather works and Pedro creates works in amber, mammoth ivory and jet.	IAU · 554239
554268 Marksylvester	2012 SD_{77}	Mark Lyle George Sylvester (b. 1952, South Africa) joined United World College of the Adriatic in 1983 and has been instrumental in its development since its early years.	IAU · 554268
554317 Rorywoodhams	2012 TO_{71}	Rory Alexander Woodhams (b. 2022), the great-grandson of the discoverer.	IAU · 554317
554466 Pablomotos	2012 TN_{321}	Pablo Motos Burgos (born 1965), a Spanish television presenter, radio host, comedian, and businessman.	IAU · 554466
554648 Olaffischer	2012 VB_{78}	Olaf Fischer (born 1958), German astronomy educator.	IAU · 554648
554704 Széppataki	2012 XH_{69}	Déryné Róza Széppataki (1793–1872), the first acclaimed female opera singer of Hungary and the best-known actress of early Hungarian theater.	IAU · 554704
554709 Magdastavinschi	2012 XW_{92}	Magdalena Iolanda Stavinschi (b. 1942), a Romanian astronomer and mathematician.	IAU · 554709
554766 Dieterkasan	2013 AC_{97}	Dieter Kasan (1941–2009), German physics and mathematics teacher at the Lauenburgische Gelehrtenschule in Ratzeburg.	IAU · 554766
554879 Kissgyula	2013 EA_{49}	Gyula Kiss (1948–2022), a Hungarian amateur astronomer.	IAU · 554879
554959 Lasica	2013 HW_{82}	Milan Lasica (1940–2021), Slovak comedian, playwright, actor and director.	IAU · 554959
554979 Michaelmazur	2013 HW_{82}	Michael J. Mazur, Canadian space scientist.	IAU · 554979
