= Déryné Róza Széppataki =

Hungarian opera singer

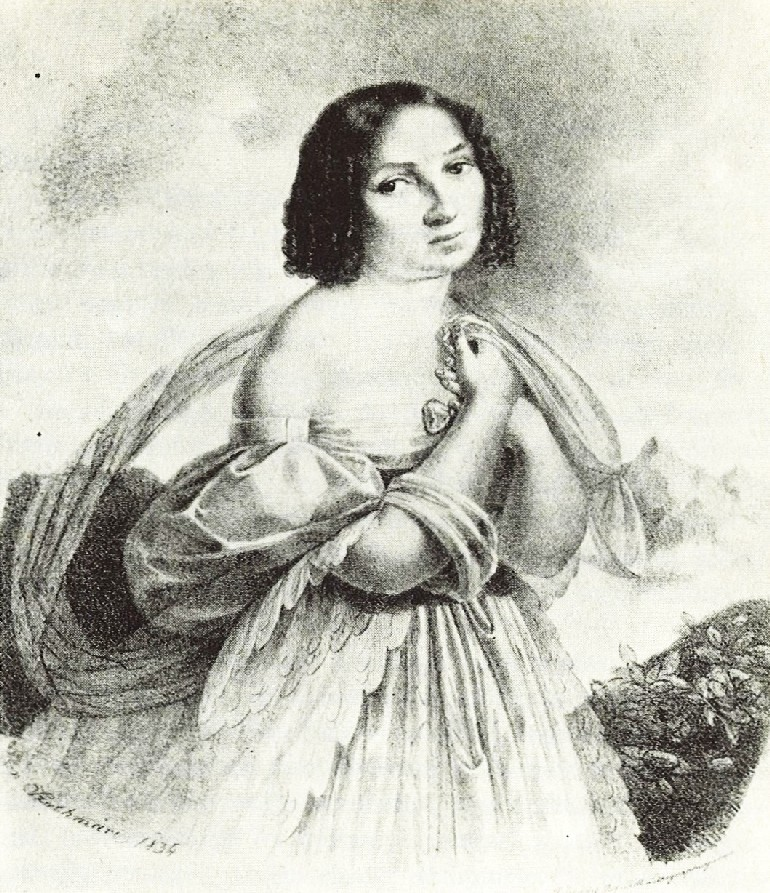
- Born: Rozália Schenbach; 23 December 1793; Jászberény, Hungary
- Died: 29 September 1872 (aged 78); Miskolc, Hungary
- Occupation: Actor
- Years active: 1815 - 1847
- Spouse: István Déry (m. 1813)
- Parent(s): Josef Schenbach; Nina Riedl

Déryné Róza Széppataki (née Rozália Schenbach; 23 December 1793, Jászberény - 29 September 1872, Miskolc), known as Déryné, was the first acclaimed female opera singer of Hungary and the best-known actress of early Hungarian theater.

== Early life ==
Rozália Schenbach was the daughter of Nina Riedl and Josef Schenbach, an apothecary from Vienna who settled in Jászberény. Her father died when she was five.

She joined the National Players Company of Pest.

== Career ==
Waiting behind the curtains for her first small role, she was blocked by the director, at the behest of the older actresses, who thought she “looked and acted foolishly,” from being allowed on stage. Crying for days after this first disappointment, Rozália was taken in the care of Mrs. and Mr. Murányi, a couple who taught her the basics of acting. One month after her first ill-fated play, she took her first role in a light-hearted comedy on 8 April 1810. Success came slowly. On the advice of director József Benke, she changed her German-sounding last name into Hungarian form as “Széppataki,” and began to take roles as an actress, also singing in choirs.

At that time in Pest, theater and drama was looked down upon as a sort of remnant of the Middle Ages and was usually produced by Germans, in the German language; the Hungarian troupe had a hard time fighting traditions. Aided by the social shift of the Reform period of the early 19th century, the doors of city mansions and country chateaus slowly opened to them. The growing audience had to be catered to by a fast-changing repertoire requiring rigorous, hard work.

Young Rozália's fame grew with each season, granting her access to increasingly prestigious roles. In 1813, she married István Déry, but alleging mistreatment, she soon separated from him. Never officially divorced, Déryné (meaning “Mrs. Déry”) became her pseudonym for the rest of her life. Leaving Pest in 1815, she took up the life of an itinerant actor, joining a number of companies, notably that of Dávid Kilényi. In the next decades she toured nearly every major city in the Hungarian parts of the Austro-Hungarian Empire, like Kassa, Brassó, Pécs, Debrecen and Kolozsvár, and became the first widely known actress in the country. Her name alone drew large crowds, and numerous paintings and poems were crafted for her. She was the subject of the first press articles by the drama critics of the era.

In 1837, she returned to Pest to join the Pesti Magyar Színház (Hungarian Theatre of Pest) — which eventually became the National Theatre of Hungary — as a leading actress. In the great flood of 1838, which demolished large parts of the emerging city, Déryné's apartment was also hit. Isolated on an upper floor without much food or water in the cold, she was rescued only days later. The accident took a heavy toll; she lost her voice for months, during which she did not take part in theatrical life. This soured her relations with both the theatre company and the audience and resulted in increasingly critical reviews after returning to the stage. Feeling neglected and isolated, Déryné started to tour again, visiting stages from her golden days: Kassa, Kolozsvár, Debrecen, and the smaller cities of Transylvania.

As she could only retain a fraction of her former success, for the first time in her career, she had to audition for roles in the National Theatre. She found it increasingly hard to disguise her fading voice, and critics accused her of having an "outdated" acting style, compared to the more modern, realistic style of new divas like Róza Laborfalvi. A year later, during which she had relatively few stage appearances, she retired in 1847.

== Later life ==
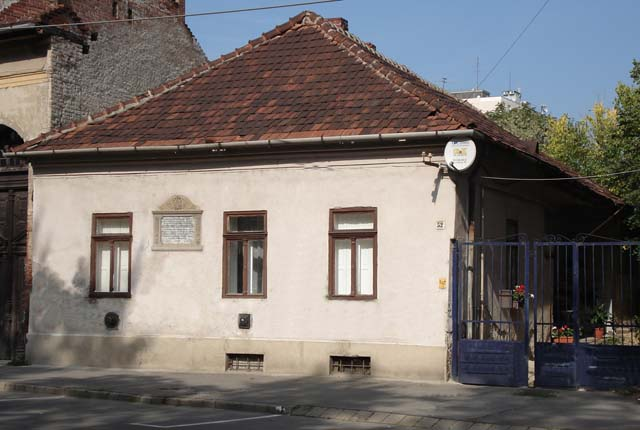
Home of the elderly Déryné in Miskolc, fitted with a memorial plaque in 1923

Having encountered her estranged husband, István Déry, again in 1838, Déryné now accepted the offer she had refused at the time: to live with him in the countryside. In full retirement, the couple lived in Tarcal and Diósgyőr, with the actress refusing contact from journalists or former colleagues.

In great poverty after Déry's death in 1868, she moved to Miskolc to live with her sister. Acceding to the request of her acting godson, Ákos Egressy, then touring in Miskolc, she took a last role in 1868. Aged 75 and supported to the stage on the arms of her fellow actors, she portrayed an old nun, with witnesses describing her acting as strong and vivid.

In the coming months, she met Emília Egervári, who was shocked to see her living conditions. Her brother, the known playwright and journalist Ödön P. Egervári, convinced the National Theatre to send immediate yearly aid to Déryné. Having nothing else to give in reciprocation, the actress promised to write her life's story. Battling worsening health, she wrote the manuscript for three years at monumental length, posting it in a continuous flow of large packets to her mentor. The memoir, which was later published in three volumes running to more than 1,000 pages, is still one of the most important sources on the life of early Hungarian opera. Déryné died on 29 September 1872, a few days after sending off a last packet of manuscripts.

In the presence of only a few neighbors and friends, she was buried in the alms house cemetery of Miskolc.

== Legacy ==
She was re-buried in Budapest in 1921. Her former home in Diósgyőr is now a museum dedicated to her work.

== Sources ==
- - Déryné Róza Széppataki in the Hungarian Theatrical Lexicon (György, Székely. Magyar Színházművészeti Lexikon. Budapest: Akadémiai Kiadó, 1994. ISBN 9789630566353), freely available on mek.oszk.hu
- István, Karcsai Kulcsár. Így élt Déryné. Budapest:Móra Ferenc Könyvkiadó, 1978. ISBN 9789631112696
- László, Tóth. Budapest:Lilium Aurum, 1998. ISBN 9788080620028
