= Main road 32 (Hungary) =

Road in Hungary

Main road 32
- 32-es főút

Route information
- Length: 80 km (50 mi)

Major junctions
- From: M3 in Hatvan-kelet
- 3 in Hatvan; 31 in Jászberény; M4, 402 in Szolnok
- To: 4, 406 near Szolnok

Location
- Country: Hungary
- Counties: Heves, Jász-Nagykun-Szolnok
- Major cities: Hatvan, Jászfényszaru, Jászberény, Újszász, Szolnok

Highway system
- Roads in Hungary; Highways; Main roads; Local roads

The Main road 32 is a northwest-southeast direction Secondary class main road in Hungary, that connecting Hatvan (Hatvan-kelet junction in M3 motorway) with Szolnok (the Main road 4 and Main road 406 junction). The road is 80 km long.

The road, as well as all other main roads in Hungary, is managed and maintained by Magyar Közút, state owned company.

== Municipalities ==
The Main road 12 runs through the following municipalities:

- Heves County: Hatvan
- Jász-Nagykun-Szolnok County: Jászfényszaru, Pusztamonostor, Jászberény, Jásztelek, Alattyán, Jánoshida, Jászalsószentgyörgy, Szászberek, Újszász, Zagyvarékas, Szolnok

== Route plan ==
km	Icon	Name	Crossed roads
0	Exit	Hatvan-kelet junction	M3 E71
1.6	Roundabout	Gyöngyös	3
2.8	Roundabout	Csány	3201
11.6	Roundabout	Zsámbok, Jászfényszaru	3106
	Crossroads	Pusztamonostor	
15.9	Crossroads	Szentmártonkáta	

== See also ==
- Roads in Hungary
- Transport in Hungary
