= Szászberek =

- Municipality
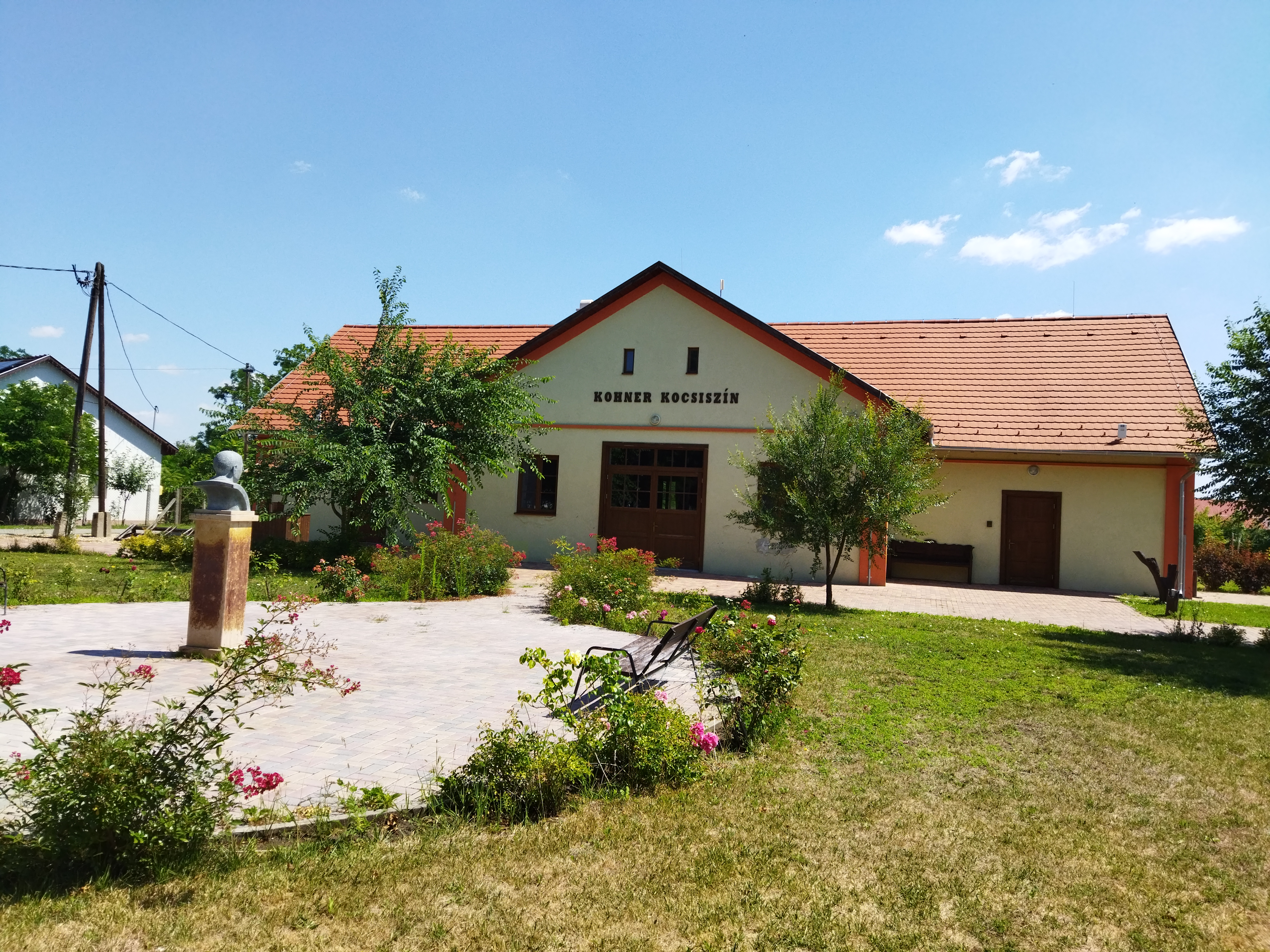

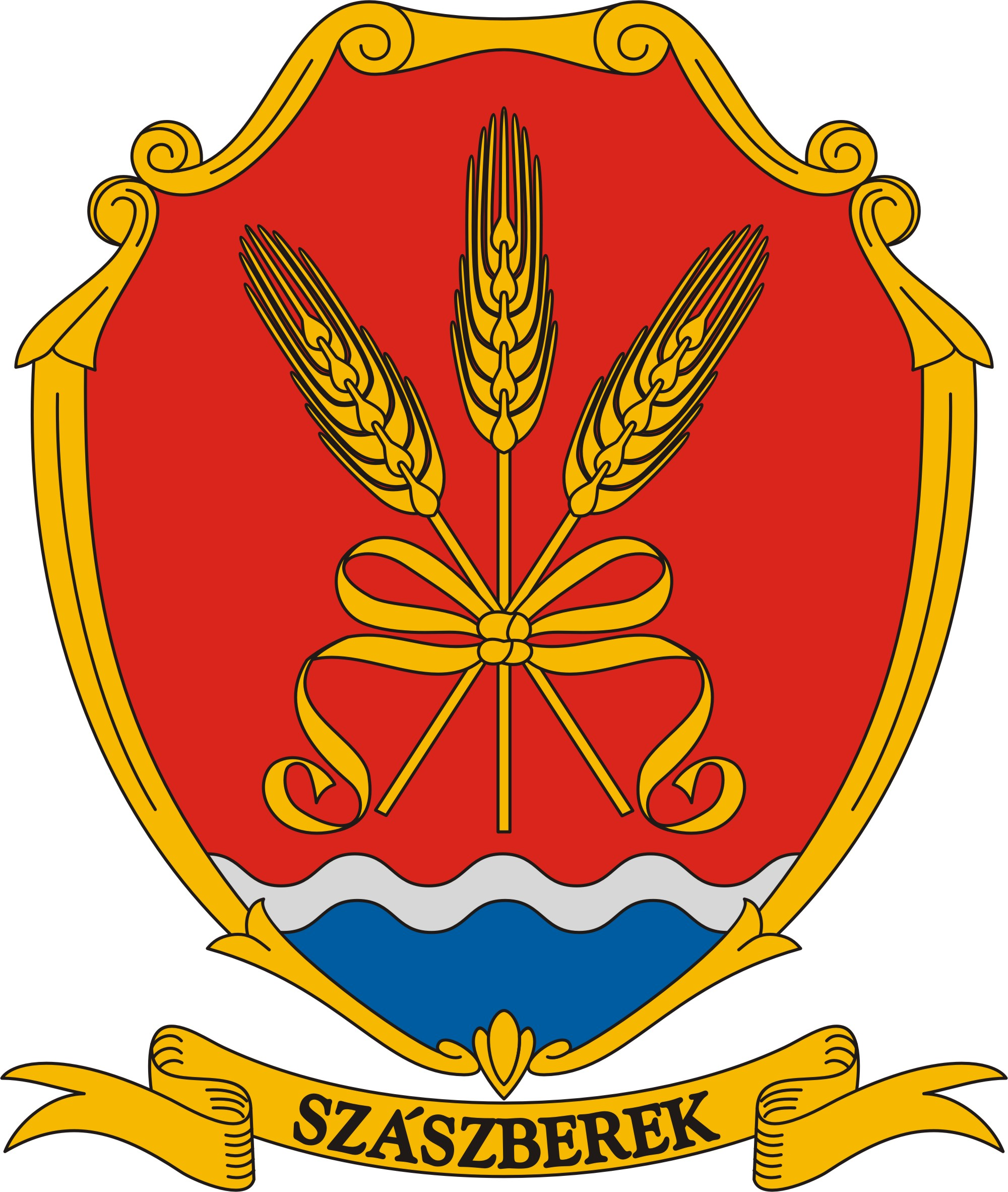
- Coat of arms

- Location within Hungary
- Coordinates: 47°18′47″N 20°06′04″E
- Country: Hungary
- Region: Northern Great Plain
- County: Jász-Nagykun-Szolnok County
- District: Szolnok District

Government
  - Mayor: József Alapi (Fidesz-KDNP)

Area
  - Total: 39.22 km^{2} (15.14 sq mi)

Population
  - Total: 894 people
- Postal code: 5053
- Area code: 56
- Website: www.szaszberek.hu

Szászberek is a community located in Szolnok District, Jász-Nagykun-Szolnok County, Hungary.

== Location ==
Szászberek is located in the western part of Hungary, on the edge near Jászság, on the left bank of the Zagyva, 17 kilometers north of the county seat, Szolnok. The immediate neighboring municipalities are: Jászalsószentgyörgy in the north, Jászladány in the northeast, Besenyszög in the east, Zagyvarékas in the south, Újszász in the southwest, and Jászboldogháza in the northwest.

== History ==
The first mention of Szászberek dates back to 1435. At that time, the name of the village was Zazberegh. In the 15th century, the settlement gained the status of a market town, but later lost it because it was depopulated by the Ottoman-Tatar conquests and devastation in the 17th century. In 1949, Szászberek gained independence from Besenyszög. The settlement's economy was determined by battery production and farming until 2003, but farming continues to this day. 2008 In autumn, the construction of a biomass power plant and pellet production plant began in an Italian-owned industrial area, which is still at the 2008 level in 2021.

== Population ==
The population of Szászberek rose to a peak of 1,029 people in 2014, but declined to 894 people by 2024.

In 2022, 92.3% of the population identified themselves as Hungarian, 0.8% as German, 0.4% as Roma, 0.1% as Polish, 0.1% as Greek, 1.9% as other, non-domestic nationality (7.5% did not declare; due to dual identities, the total may be greater than 100%). Of the population, 31.8% called themselves Roman Catholic, 2.7% as Calvinist, 1% as Greek Catholic, 0.1% as Lutheran, 0.1% as Orthodox, 0.1% as Judaist, 1.4% as other Christian, 4.4% as other Catholic, and 19.5% as non-denominational (38.9% did not respond).

== Mayors ==
- 1990–1994: Ifj. Pető Miklós (MDF)
- 1994–1998: Ifj. Pető Miklós (MDF-Fidesz-FKgP-KDNP)
- 1998–2002: Vasas Zsuzsanna (Independent)
- 2002–2006: Vasas Zsuzsanna (Independent)
- 2006–2010: Vasas Zsuzsanna (Independent)
- 2010–2014: Alapi József (Independent)
- 2014–2019: Alapi József (Fidesz-KDNP)
- 2019-től: Alapi József (Fidesz-KDNP)
