= Szolnok District =

Coordinates: 47.2000°N 20.1833°E

Szolnok District Szolnoki járás
- Districts of Hungary
- Flag Coat of arms

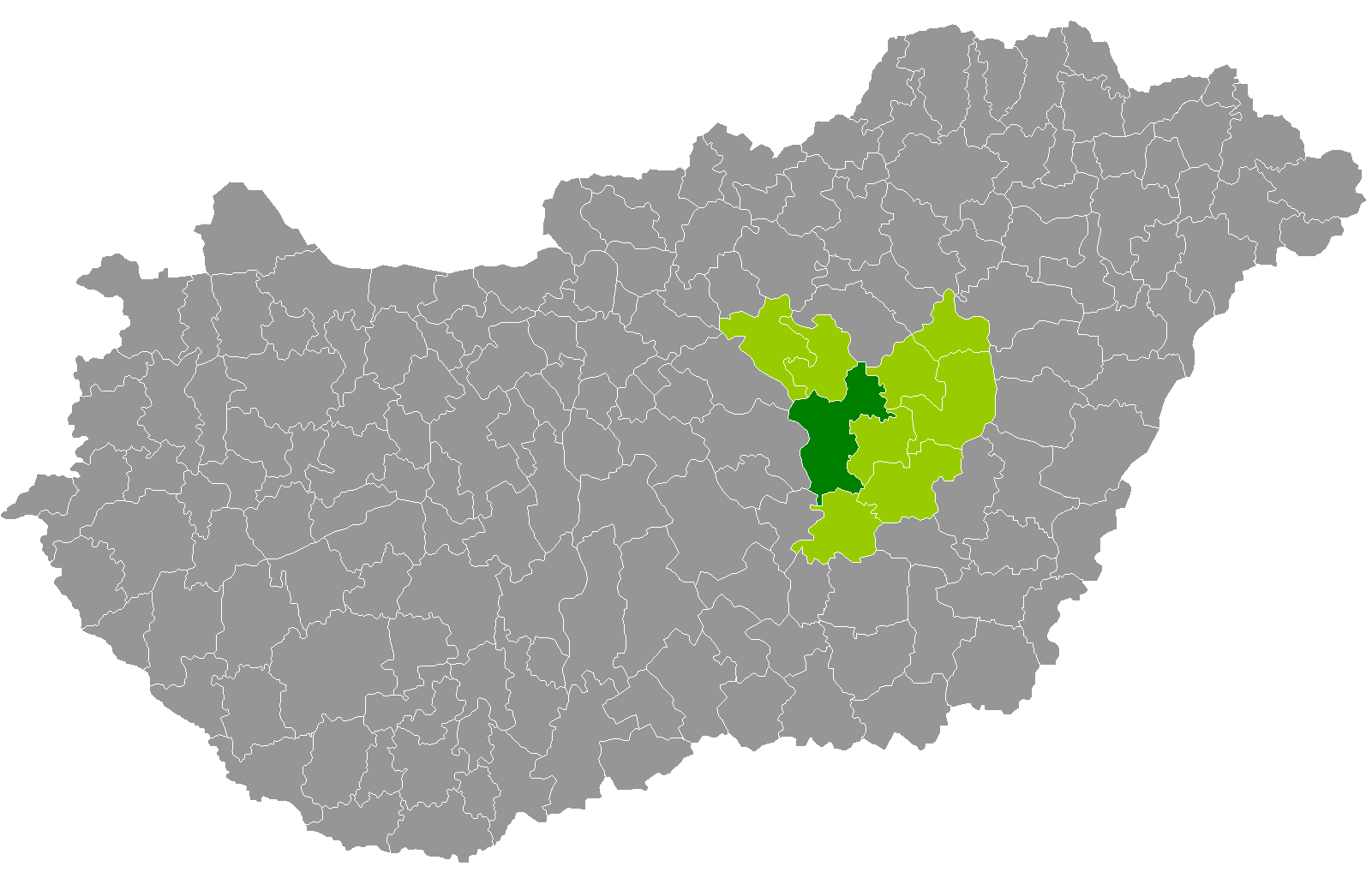
- Szolnok District within Hungary and Jász-Nagykun-Szolnok County.
- Country: Hungary
- County: Jász-Nagykun-Szolnok
- District seat: Szolnok

Area
  - Total: 914.48 km^{2} (353.08 sq mi)
  - Rank: 1st in Jász-Nagykun-Szolnok

Population (2011 census)
  - Total: 118,241
  - Rank: 1st in Jász-Nagykun-Szolnok
  - Density: 129/km^{2} (330/sq mi)

Szolnok (Hungarian: Szolnoki járás) is a district in western part of Jász-Nagykun-Szolnok County. Szolnok is also the name of the town where the district seat is found. The district is located in the Northern Great Plain Statistical Region.

== Geography ==
Szolnok District borders with Jászberény District and Jászapáti District to the north, Kunhegyes District, Törökszentmiklós District and Mezőtúr District to the east, Kunszentmárton District and Tiszakécske District (Bács-Kiskun County) to the south, Cegléd District and Nagykáta District (Pest County) to the west. The number of the inhabited places in Szolnok District is 18.

== Municipalities ==
The district has 1 urban county, 4 towns and 13 villages. (ordered by population, as of 1 January 2012)

- **Besenyszög** (3,372)
- Csataszög (295)
- Hunyadfalva (169)
- Kőtelek (1,571)
- **Martfű** (6,435)
- Nagykörű (1,651)
- **Rákóczifalva** (5,359)
- Rákócziújfalu (2,002)
- Szajol (3,734)
- Szászberek (894)
- **Szolnok** (74,341) – district and county seat
- Tiszajenő (1,642)
- Tiszasüly (1,370)
- Tiszavárkony (1,526)
- Tószeg (4,380)
- **Újszász** (6,360)
- Vezseny (692)
- Zagyvarékas (3,512)

The bolded municipalities are cities.

== Demographics ==
Religion in Szolnok District (2011 census)
1. Catholic Church (30.7%)
2. Greek Catholicism (0.50%)
3. Calvinism (6.50%)
4. Lutheranism (0.40%)
5. Other religions (1.20%)
6. Non-religious (29.6%)
7. Atheists (1.80%)
8. Undeclared (29.3%)

In 2011, it had a population of 118,241 and the population density was 129/km^{2}.

Year	County population	Change
2011	118,241	n/a

=== Ethnicity ===
Besides the Hungarian majority, the main minorities are the Roma (approx. 3,000), German (600), Russian (250) and Romanian (200).

Total population (2011 census): 118,241
Ethnic groups (2011 census): Identified themselves: 106,079 persons:

- Hungarians: 100,632 (94.87%)
- Gypsies: 3,108 (2.93%)
- Others and indefinable: 2,339 (2.20%)

Approx. 12,000 persons in Szolnok District did not declare their ethnic group at the 2011 census.

=== Religion ===
Religious adherence in the county according to 2011 census:

- Catholic – 36,277 (Roman Catholic – 35,678; Greek Catholic – 589);
- Reformed – 7,721;
- Evangelical – 525;
- other religions – 1,427;
- Non-religious – 35,231;
- Atheism – 2,257;
- Undeclared – 34,803.

== Gallery ==
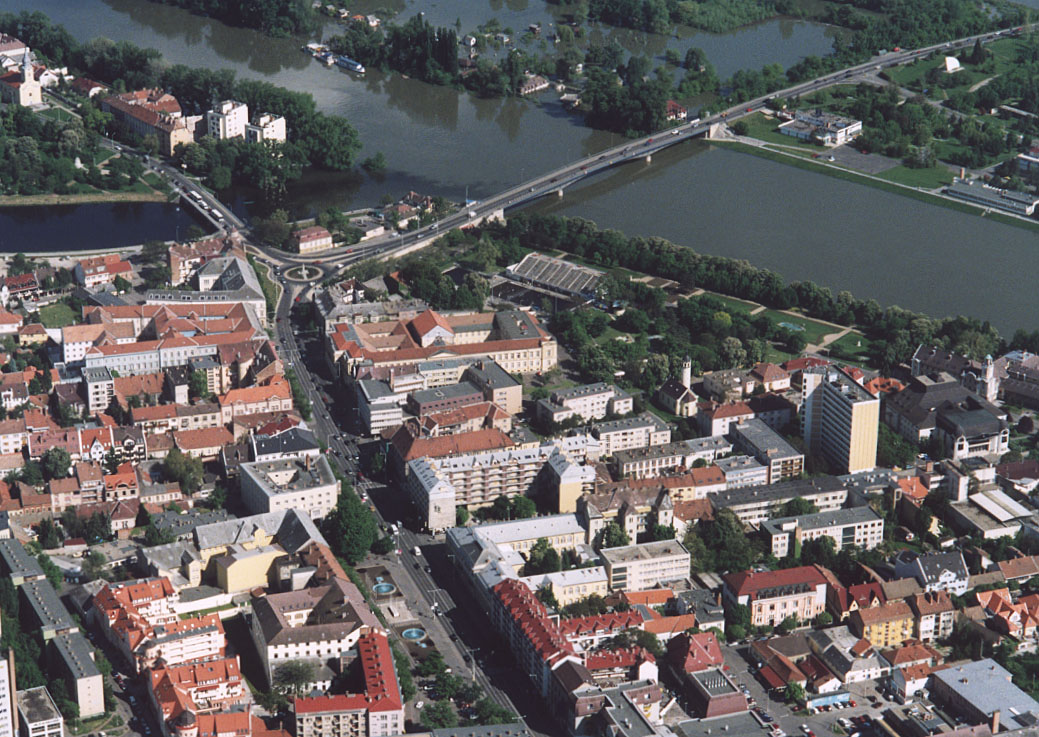
Szolnok, the Capital of Tisza

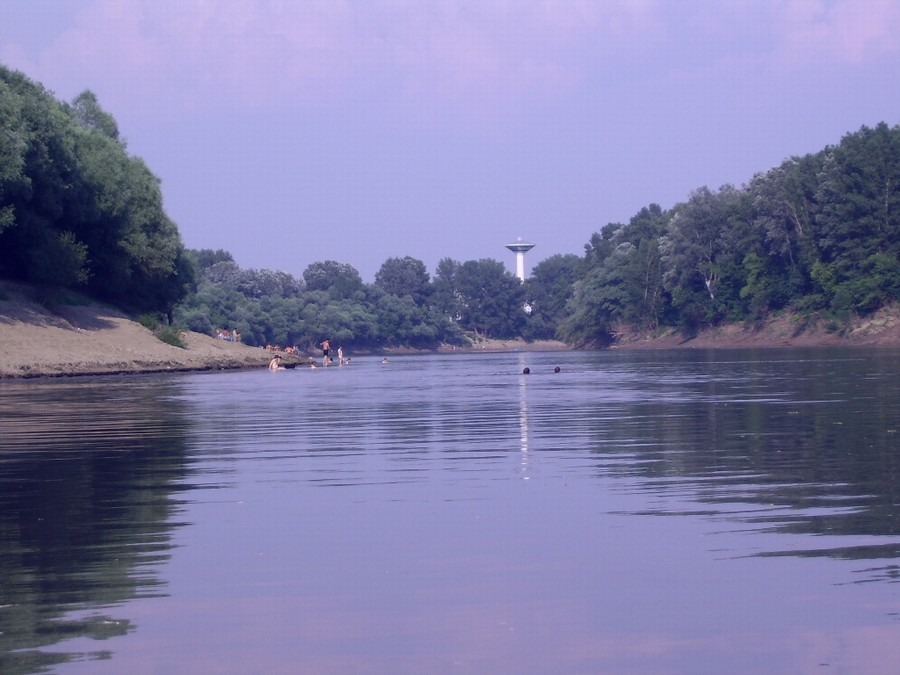
Martfű, from the Tisza river

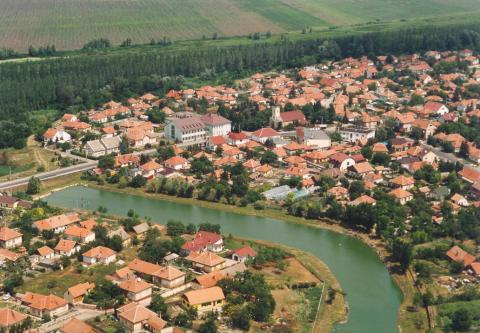
Aerial view of Tószeg

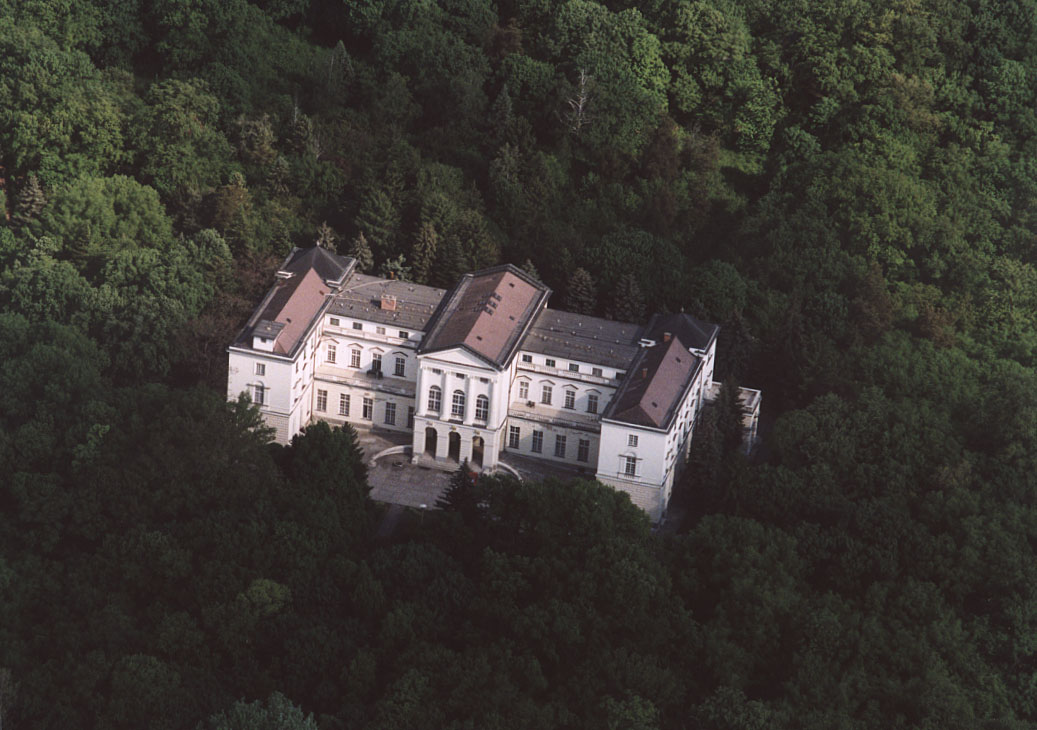
Orczy Mansion in Újszász

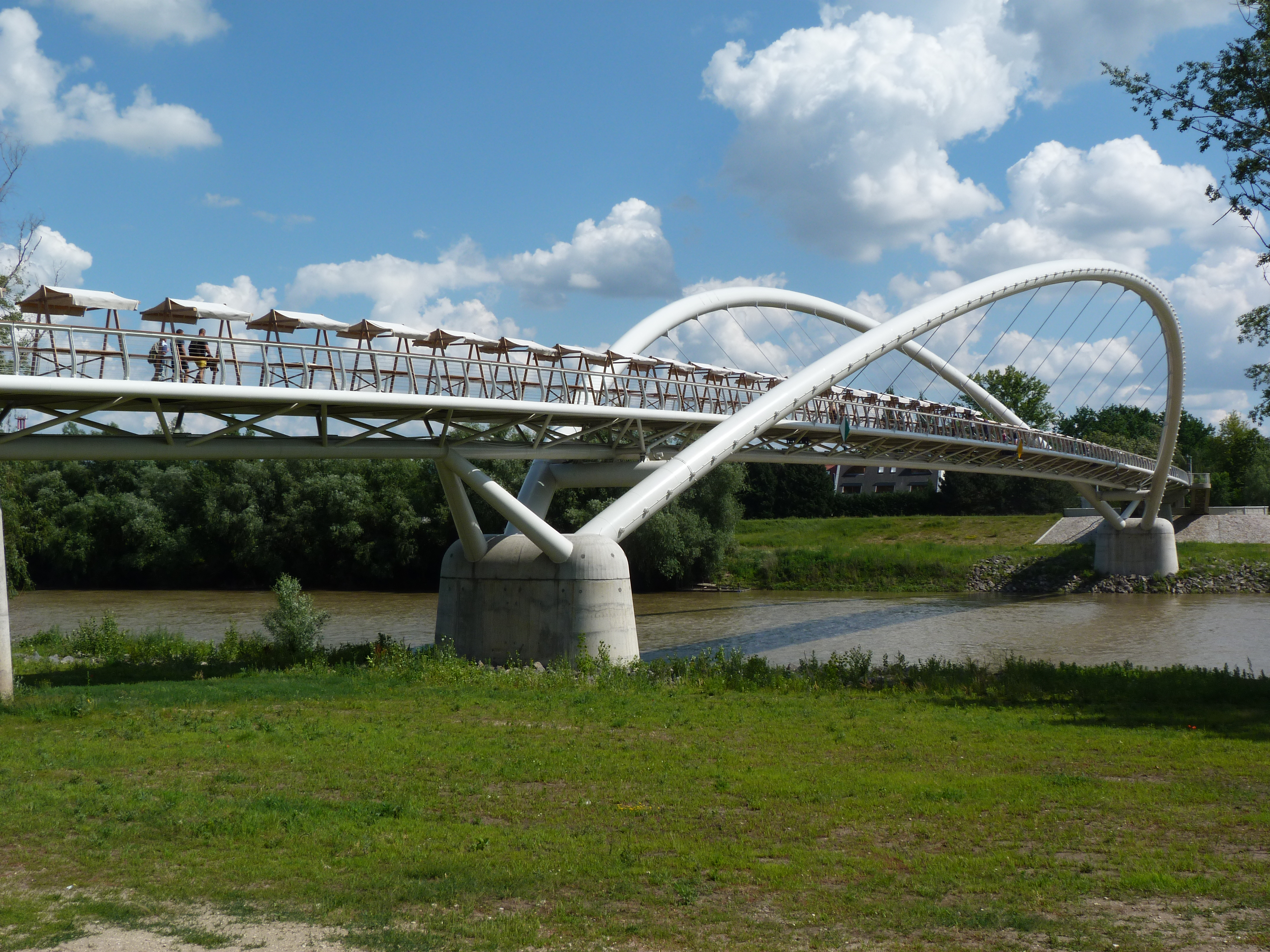
Tiszavirág Bridge

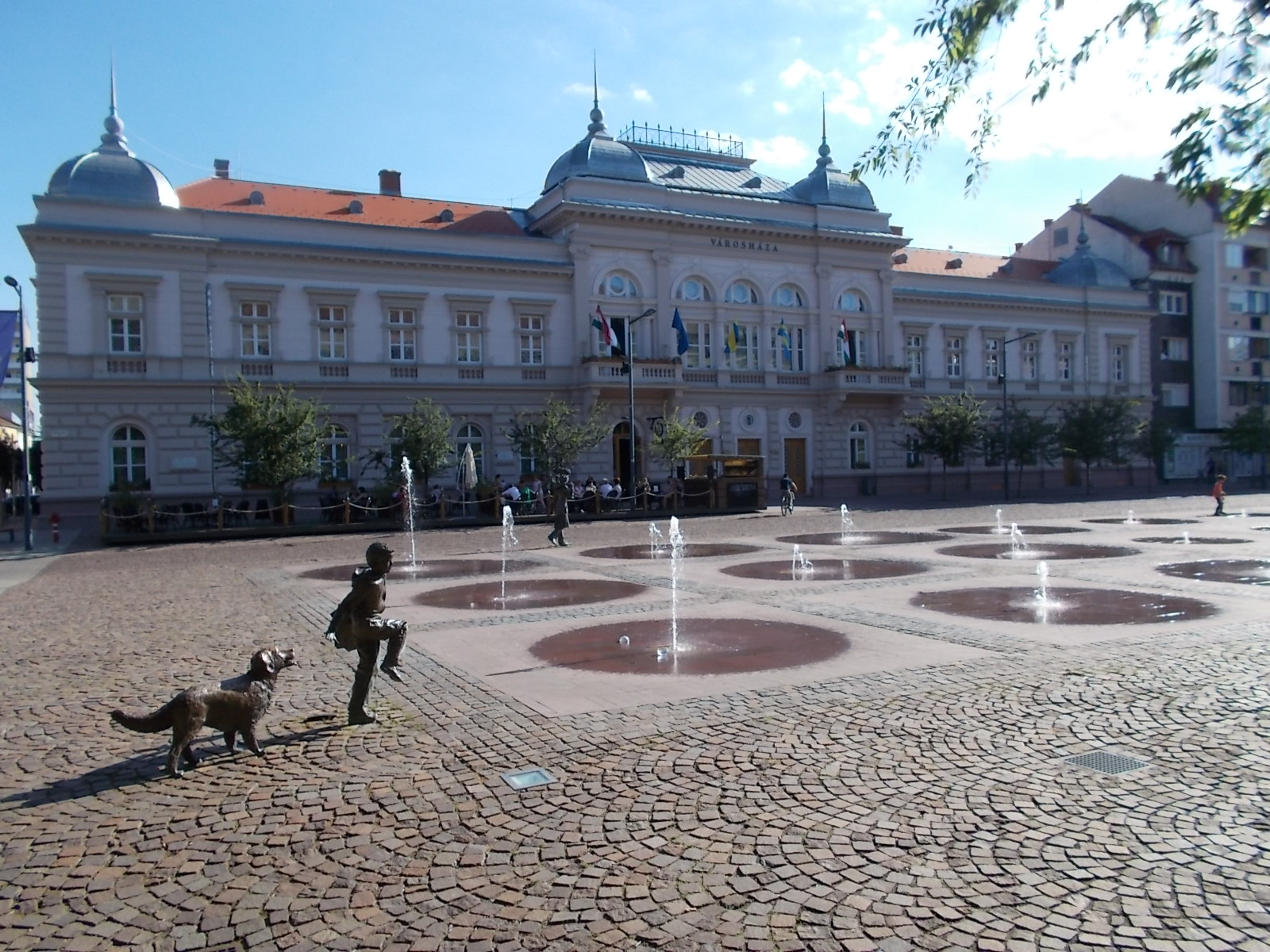
Town Hall in Szolnok

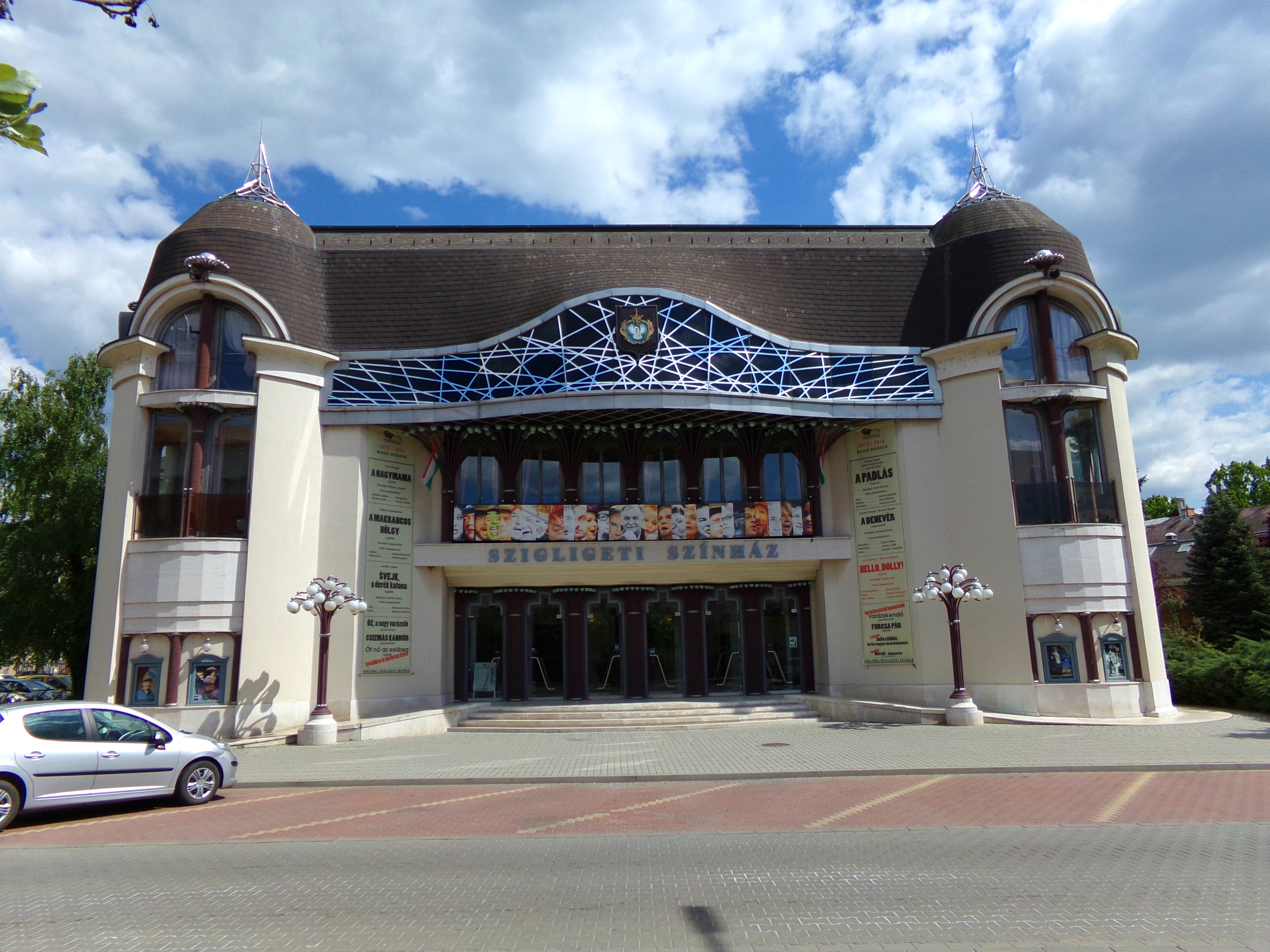
Szigligeti Theater (Szolnok)

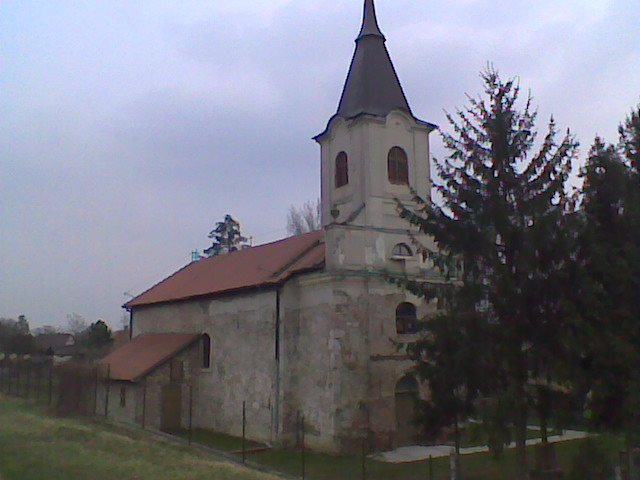
St. Ladislaus Church in Tiszasüly

== See also ==
- List of cities and towns of Hungary
