= Jászberény District =

Coordinates: 47.4667°N 20.0500°E

Jászberény District Jászberényi járás
- Districts of Hungary
- Coat of arms

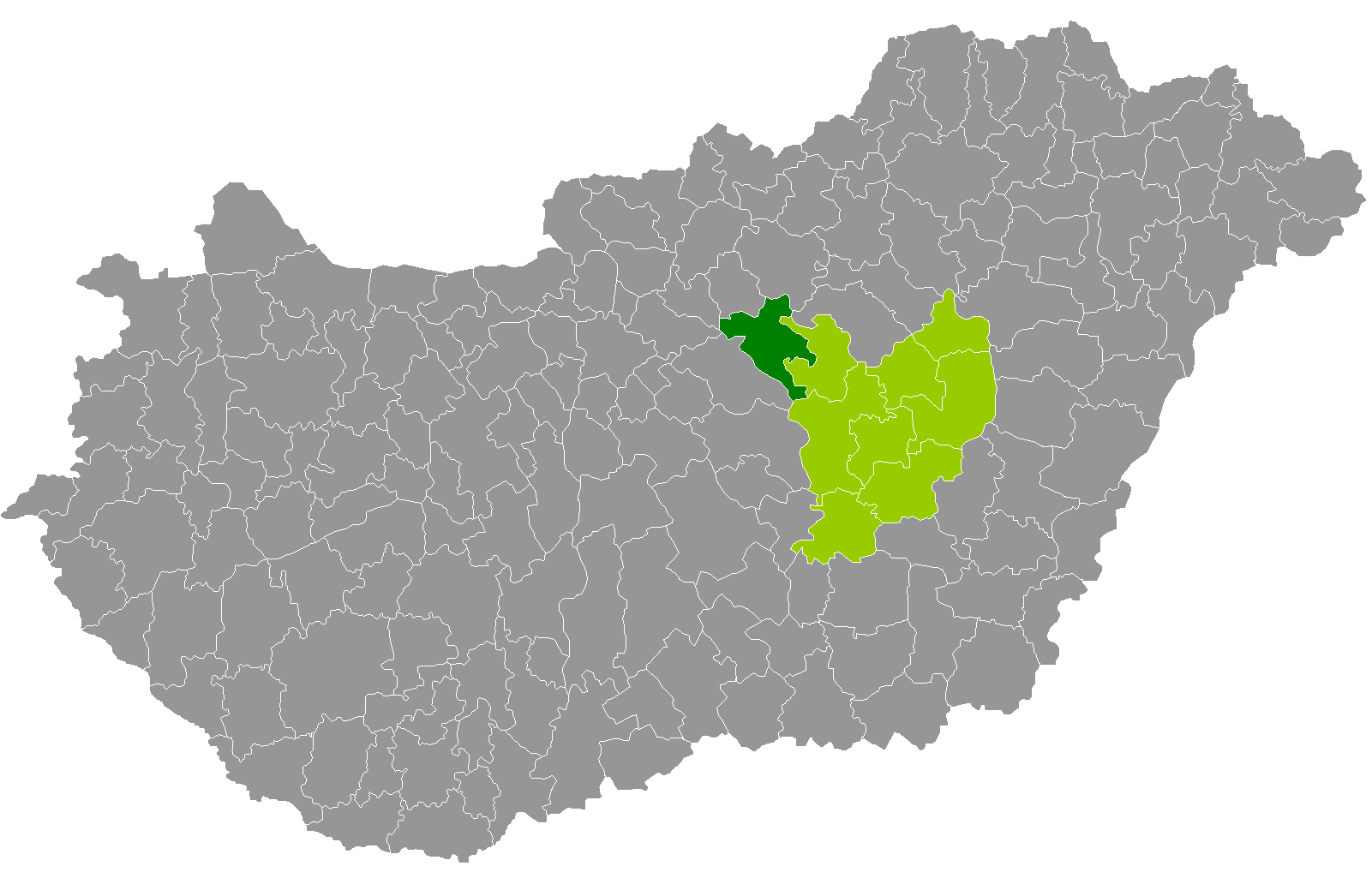
- Jászberény District within Hungary and Jász-Nagykun-Szolnok County.
- Country: Hungary
- County: Jász-Nagykun-Szolnok
- District seat: Jászberény

Area
  - Total: 617.01 km^{2} (238.23 sq mi)
  - Rank: 4th in Jász-Nagykun-Szolnok

Population (2011 census)
  - Total: 51,274
  - Rank: 2nd in Jász-Nagykun-Szolnok
  - Density: 83/km^{2} (210/sq mi)

Jászberény (Hungarian: Jászberényi járás) is a district in north-western part of Jász-Nagykun-Szolnok County. Jászberény is also the name of the town where the district seat is found. The district is located in the Northern Great Plain Statistical Region. This district is a part of Jászság historical, ethnographical and geographical region.

== Geography ==
Jászberény District borders with Hatvan District and Gyöngyös District (Heves County) to the north, Jászapáti District to the east, Szolnok District to the south, Nagykáta District and Aszód District (Pest County) to the southwest. The number of the inhabited places in Jászberény District is 9.

== History ==
The Jászberény District existed all the way before the closure of the districts in 1983, known as the district from the 1950s. Formerly known as Upper Jászság District, its seat was Jászberény.

As of January 1, 1984, a new administrative position came into effect, therefore, on December 31, 1983, all districts, including Jászberény District, ceased to exist. The Jászberény Neighborhood was formed from the area of the ceased district. Between 1994 and 2013 this area was part of Jászberény Subregion.

== Municipalities ==
The district has 3 towns and 6 villages. (ordered by population, as of 1 January 2012)

- Jászágó (687)
- **Jászárokszállás** (7,806)
- **Jászberény** (26,924) – district seat
- Jászboldogháza (1,585)
- Jászfelsőszentgyörgy (1,974)
- **Jászfényszaru** (5,621)
- Jászjákóhalma (3,049)
- Jásztelek (1,627)
- Pusztamonostor (1,579)

The bolded municipalities are cities.

== Demographics ==
Religion in Jászberény District (2011 census)
1. Catholic Church (56.7%)
2. Greek Catholicism (0.20%)
3. Calvinism (3.10%)
4. Lutheranism (0.10%)
5. Other religions (1.10%)
6. Non-religious (11.9%)
7. Atheists (0.90%)
8. Undeclared (26.0%)

In 2011, it had a population of 51,274 and the population density was 83/km^{2}.

Year	County population	Change
2011	51,274	n/a

=== Ethnicity ===
Besides the Hungarian majority, the main minorities are the Roma (approx. 2,000), German (150) and Romanian (100).

Total population (2011 census): 51,274
Ethnic groups (2011 census): Identified themselves: 47,260 persons:

- Hungarians: 44,473 (94.10%)
- Gypsies: 2,152 (4.55%)
- Others and indefinable: 635 (1.34%)

Approx. 4,000 persons in Jászberény District did not declare their ethnic group at the 2011 census.

=== Religion ===
Religious adherence in the county according to 2011 census:

- Catholic – 29,156 (Roman Catholic – 29,029; Greek Catholic – 122);
- Reformed – 1,557;
- Evangelical – 70;
- other religions – 578;
- Non-religious – 6,109;
- Atheism – 453;
- Undeclared – 13,351.

== Transport ==
=== Road network ===
- Main road (W→E): Budapest... – **Jászberény District** (2 municipalities: Jászberény, Jászjákóhalma) – ...Dormánd
- Main road (NW→SE): Hatvan... – **Jászberény District** (4 municipalities: Jászfényszaru, Pusztamonostor, Jászberény, Jásztelek) – ...Szolnok

=== Railway network ===
- Line 82 (NW→SE): Hatvan (80, 81)... – **Jászberény District** (4 municipalities: Jászfényszaru, Pusztamonostor, Jászberény, Jászboldogháza) – ...Újszász (86, 120)
- Line 86 (N→E): Vámosgyörk (80, 85)... – **Jászberény District** (1 municipality: Jászárokszállás) – ...Újszász (82, 120)

== Gallery ==
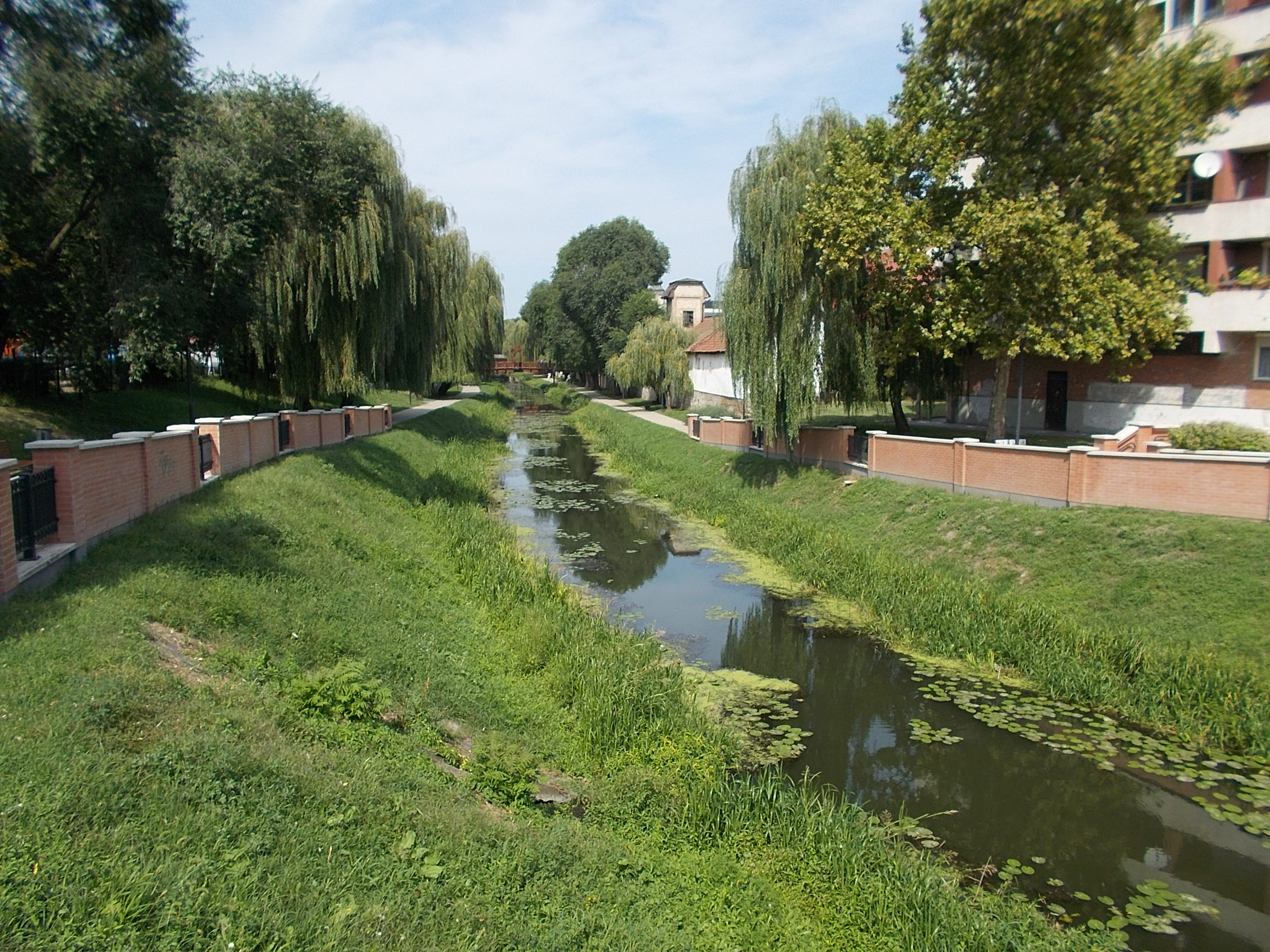
Jászberény, the Capital of Jászság

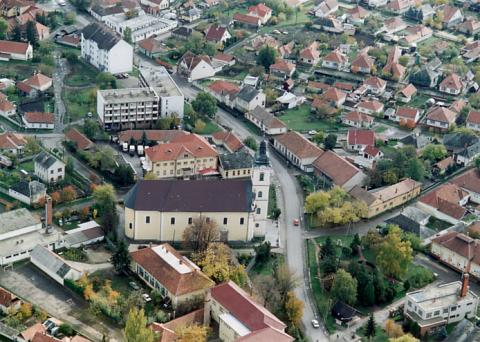
Aerial view of Jászárokszállás

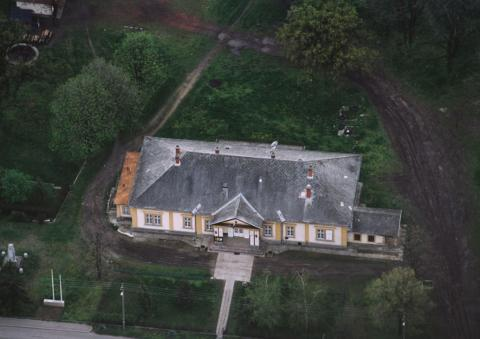
Balázsovich Mansion in Pusztamonostor

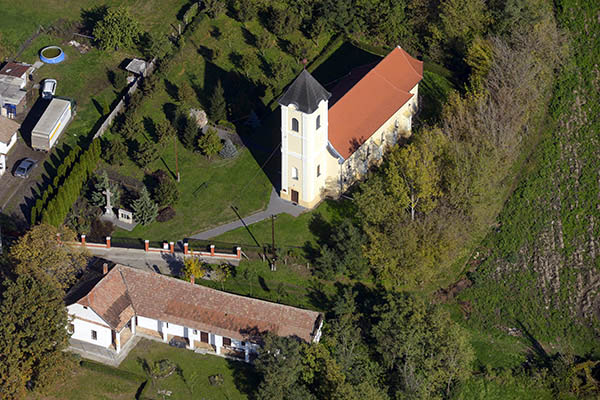
St. George Church in Jászfelsőszentgyörgy

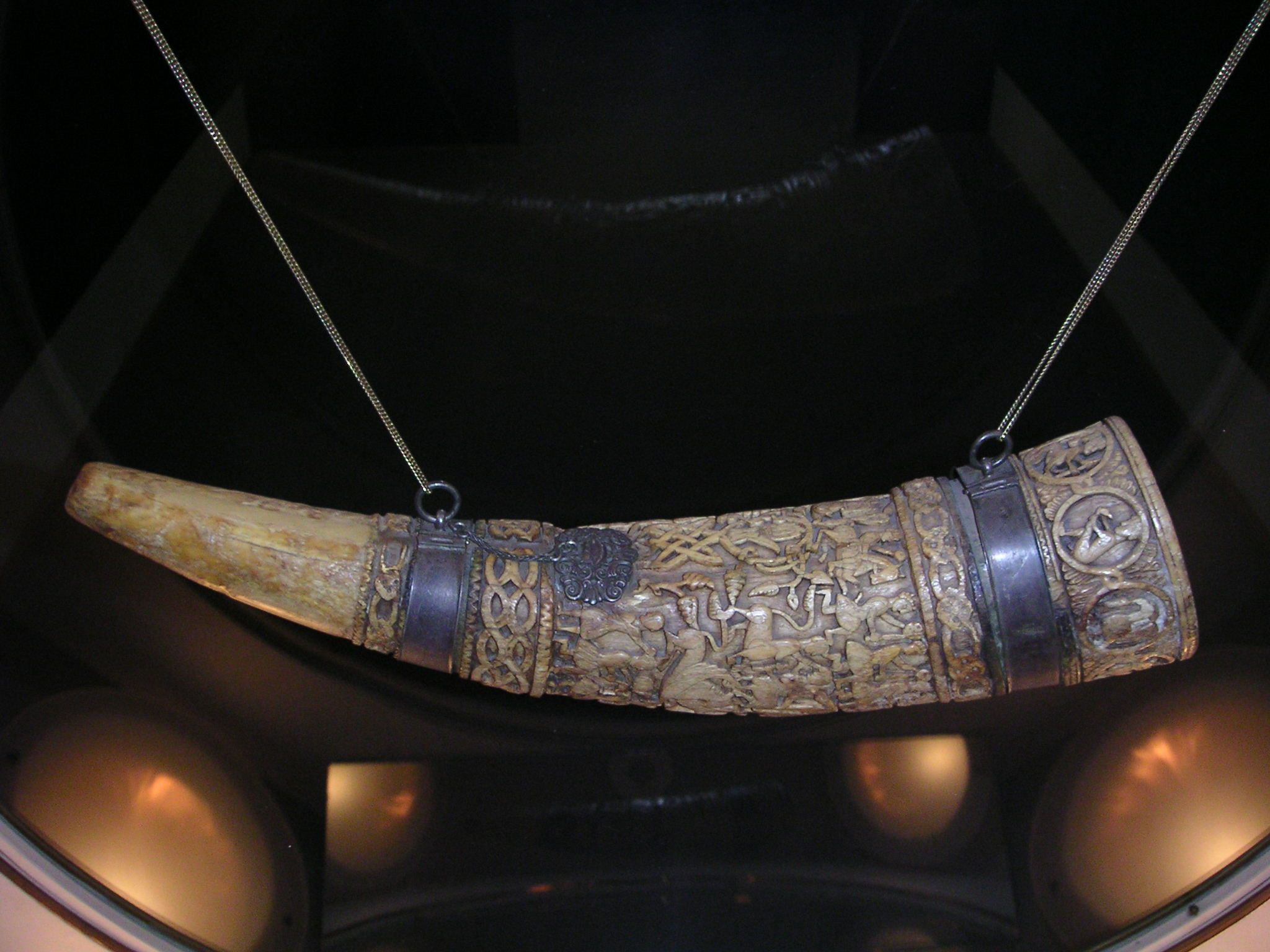
Lehel's horn

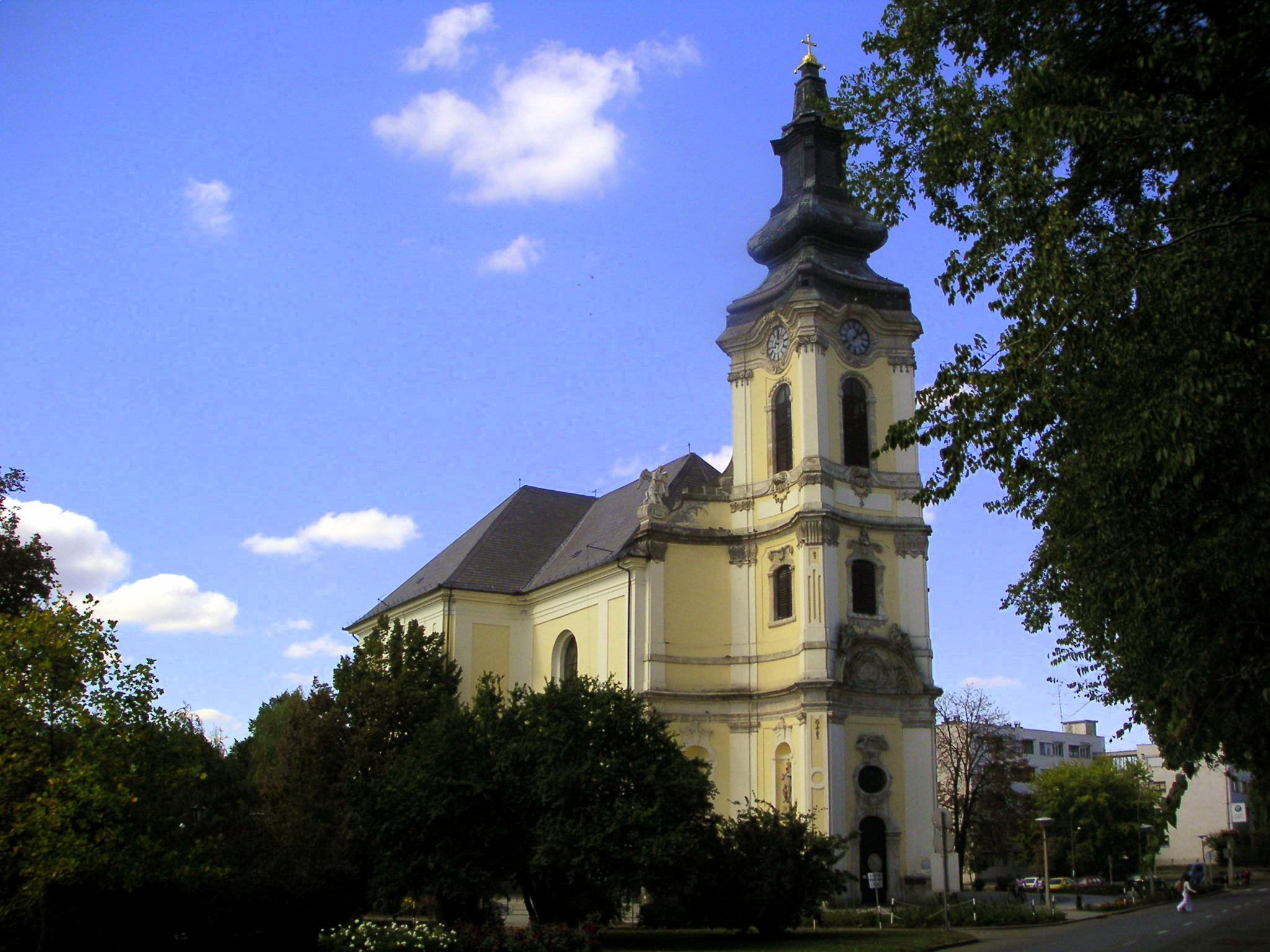
Great Church of Jászberény

== See also ==
- List of cities and towns of Hungary
