= Csataszög =

- Village
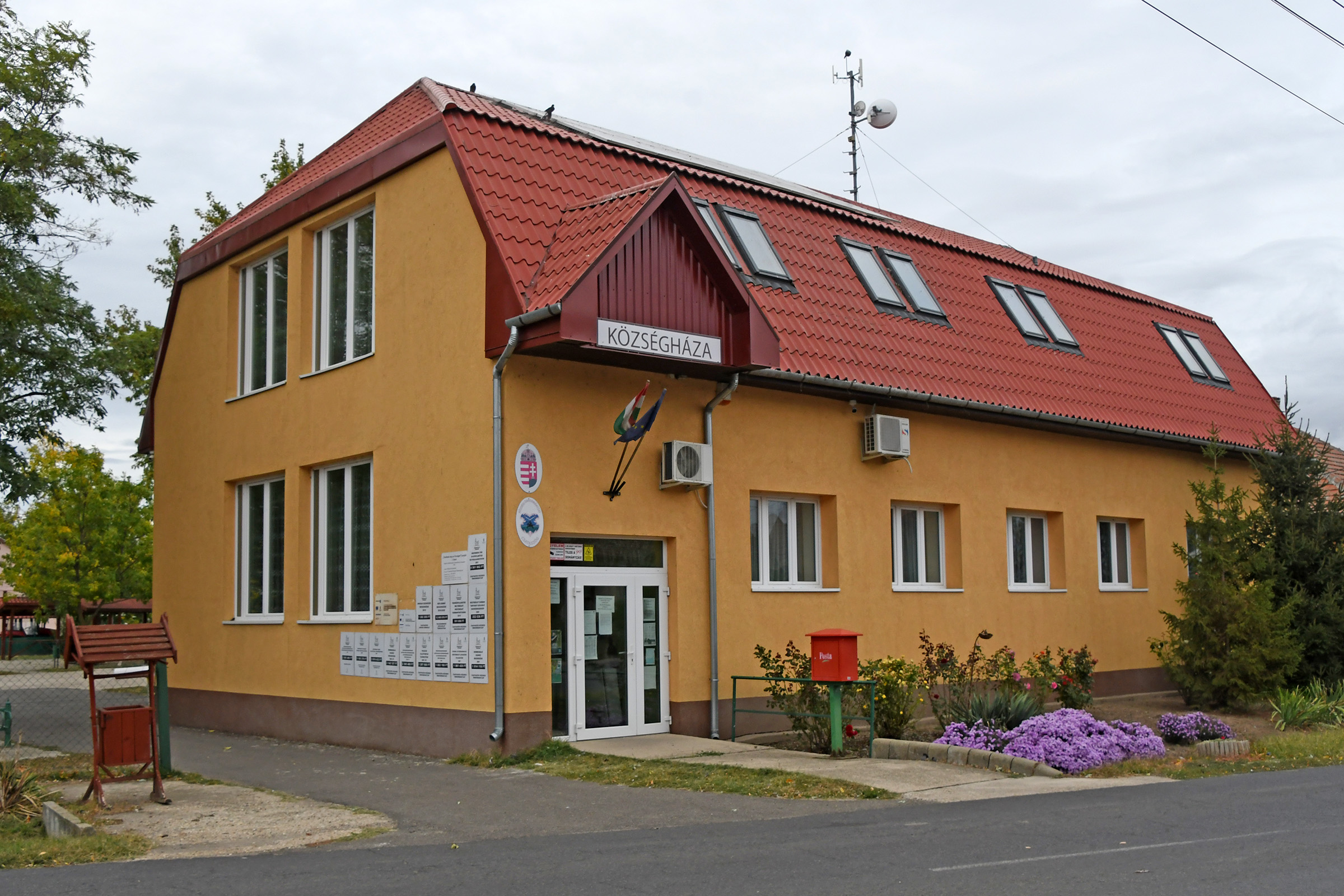
- Town hall

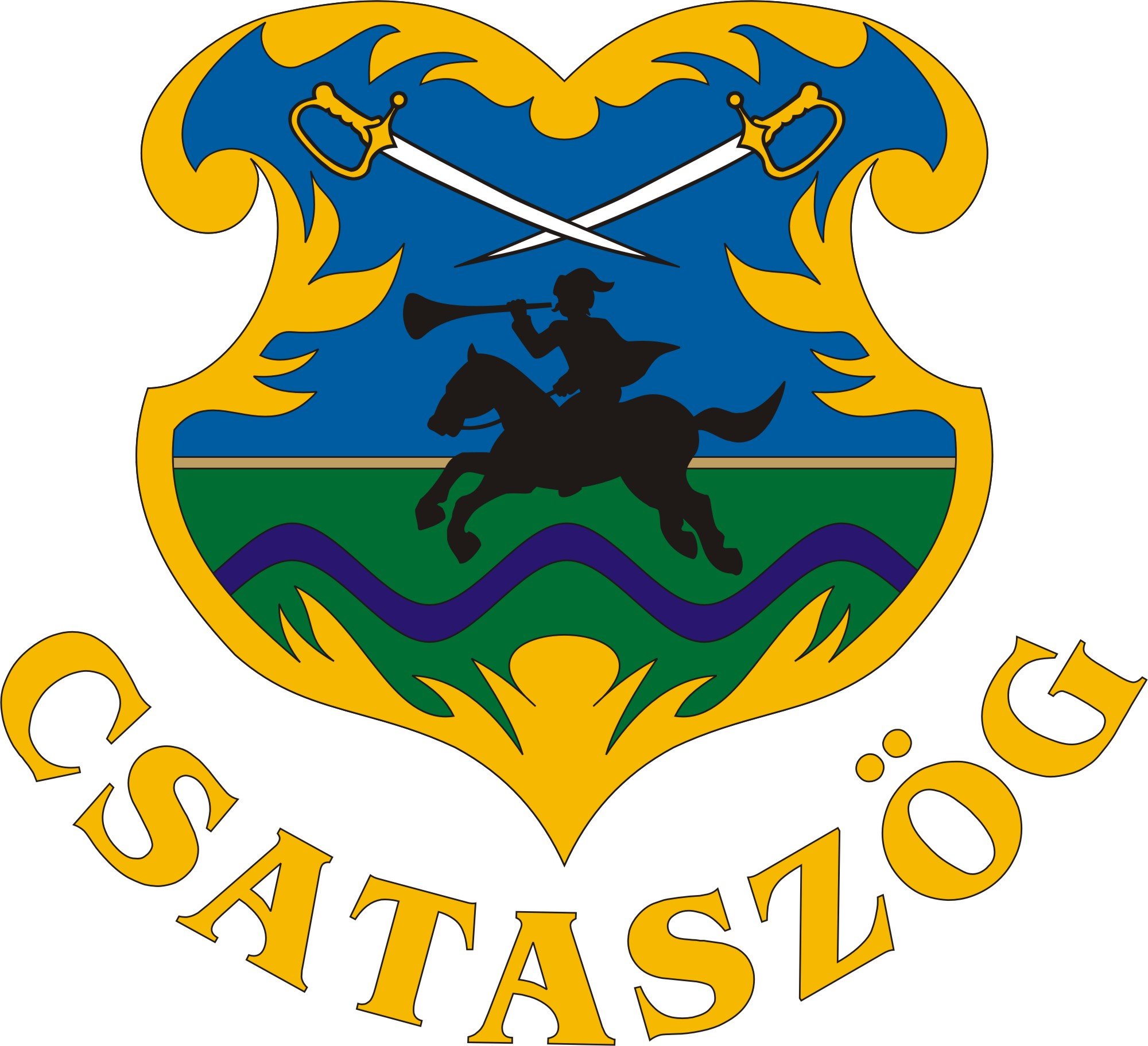
- Coat of arms

- Location within Hungary
- Coordinates: 47°17′6″N 20°23′13″E
- Country: Hungary
- County: Jász-Nagykun-Szolnok
- District: Szolnok

Area
  - Total: 11.21 km^{2} (4.33 sq mi)

Population (2015)
  - Total: 294
  - Density: 26.2/km^{2} (68/sq mi)
- Time zone: UTC+1 (CET)
  - Summer (DST): UTC+2 (CEST)
- Postal code: 5064
- Area code(s): (+36) 56

Csataszög is a village in Jász-Nagykun-Szolnok county, in the Northern Great Plain region of central Hungary.

== Geography ==
It covers an area of 11.21 km^{2} (4 sq mi).

== Population ==
It has a population of 294 people (2015).
