= Tiszasüly =

- Village
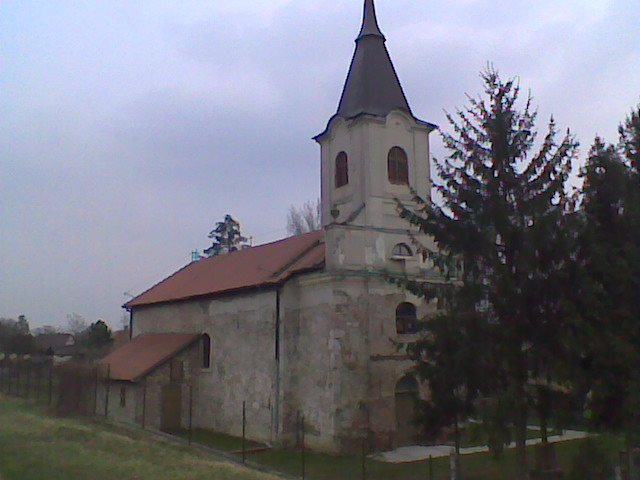
- The Roman Catholic Church of Tiszasüly

- Coat of arms

- Location within Hungary
- Coordinates: 47°23′17″N 20°23′17″E
- Country: Hungary
- County: Jász-Nagykun-Szolnok
- District: Szolnok

Area
  - Total: 91.77 km^{2} (35.43 sq mi)

Population (2025)
  - Total: 1,332
  - Density: 15.97/km^{2} (41.4/sq mi)
- Time zone: UTC+1 (CET)
  - Summer (DST): UTC+2 (CEST)
- Postal code: 5061
- Area code: (+36) 56
- Website: www.tiszasuly.hu

Tiszasüly is a village in Jász-Nagykun-Szolnok county, in the Northern Great Plain region of central Hungary.

As of 1 January 2025, it has a population of 1,332.
