= Jászfényszaru =

- Town
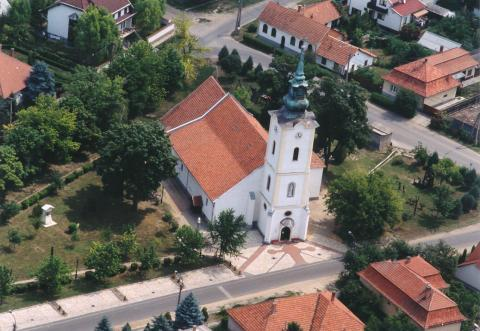
- Aerial photography: Jászfényszaru, temple

- Flag Coat of arms

- Location of Jászfényszaru
- Coordinates: 47°34′19″N 19°43′10″E
- Country: Hungary
- County: Jász-Nagykun-Szolnok
- District: Jászberény

Area
  - Total: 76.16 km^{2} (29.41 sq mi)

Population (2015)
  - Total: 5,567
  - Density: 73.1/km^{2} (189/sq mi)
- Time zone: UTC+1 (CET)
  - Summer (DST): UTC+2 (CEST)
- Postal code: 5126
- Area code: (+36) 57
- Website: www.jaszfenyszaru.hu

Jászfényszaru is a town in Jász-Nagykun-Szolnok county, in the Northern Great Plain region of central Hungary.

== Geography ==
It covers an area of 76.16 km^{2} (29 sq mi) and has a population of 5,567 people (2015). It is the meeting of three regions: the North-Hungary, the North-Plain and the Central region. The neighbouring towns are: Hatvan, Csány and Boldog (Heves county), Pusztamonostor (Jász-Nagykun-Szolnok county), Zsámbok, Szentlőrinckáta and Tóalmás (Pest county). Jászfényszaru is at the mouth of Zagyva and Galga rivers.

It has the second largest Samsung factory in Europe after the Slovak one.

== Twin towns – sister cities ==
Jászfényszaru is twinned with:

- Borș, Romania
- Hat, Ukraine
- Kiskunfélegyháza, Hungary
- Zakliczyn, Poland
