= Kőtelek =

- Village
- Coat of arms

- Location within Hungary
- Coordinates: 47°20′10″N 20°26′6″E
- Country: Hungary
- County: Jász-Nagykun-Szolnok
- District: Szolnok

Area
  - Total: 45.13 km^{2} (17.42 sq mi)

Population (2015)
  - Total: 1,609
  - Density: 35.6/km^{2} (92/sq mi)
- Time zone: UTC+1 (CET)
  - Summer (DST): UTC+2 (CEST)
- Postal code: 5062
- Area code(s): (+36) 56

Kőtelek is a village in Jász-Nagykun-Szolnok county, in the Northern Great Plain region of central Hungary.

== Geography ==
Kőtelek is located on the right bank of the Tisza, in the central-north-eastern part of the county, about 30 km northeast of Szolnok . The neighboring municipalities Nagykörű , Tiszasüly and Hunyadfalva or expelled from the left bank of Tiszabő. It covers an area of 45.13 km^{2} (17 sq mi) on the right bank of the river Tisza, and has a population of 1609 people (2015).
