= Vezseny =

- Village
- Coat of arms

- Location within Hungary
- Coordinates: 47°2′0″N 20°13′0″E
- Country: Hungary
- County: Jász-Nagykun-Szolnok
- District: Szolnok

Area
  - Total: 25.17 km^{2} (9.72 sq mi)

Population (2015)
  - Total: 647
  - Density: 25.7/km^{2} (67/sq mi)
- Time zone: UTC+1 (CET)
  - Summer (DST): UTC+2 (CEST)
- Postal code: 5093
- Area code(s): (+36) 56

Vezseny is a village in Jász-Nagykun-Szolnok county, in the Northern Great Plain region of central Hungary.

== Geography ==
Vezseny covers an area of 25.17 km^{2} (10 sq mi) and has a population of 647 people (2015). It has experienced a long-term population decline, reflecting broader patterns of rural depopulation in the region. According to data from the Hungarian Central Statistical Office (KSH), the population stood at 893 in 1980, declining to 764 in 1990 and 634 in 2001. It recorded a slight increase to 651 in 2011 before decreasing to 604 in 2022 census, and further to 578 in 2025.
