= Jászfelsőszentgyörgy =

- Village
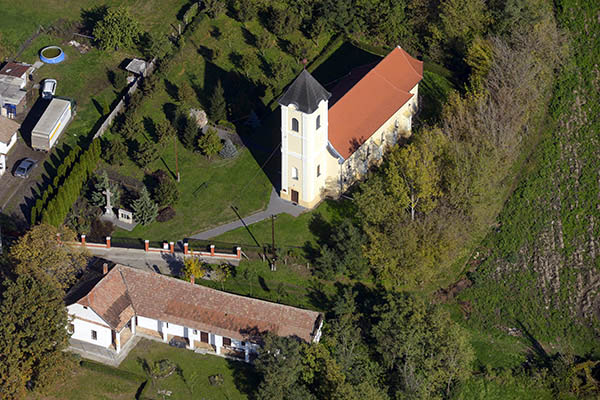

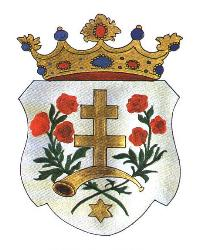
- Coat of arms

- Location within Hungary
- Coordinates: 47°30′32″N 19°47′26″E
- Country: Hungary
- County: Jász-Nagykun-Szolnok
- District: Jászberény

Area
  - Total: 39.28 km^{2} (15.17 sq mi)

Population (2013)
  - Total: 1,905
  - Density: 48.5/km^{2} (126/sq mi)
- Time zone: UTC+1 (CET)
  - Summer (DST): UTC+2 (CEST)
- Postal code: 5111
- Area code(s): (+36) 57

Jászfelsőszentgyörgy is a village in Jász-Nagykun-Szolnok county, in the Northern Great Plain region of central Hungary.

== Geography ==
It covers an area of 39.28 km^{2} (15 sq mi) and has a population of 1,905 people (2013 estimate). It lies on the right side of the Zagyva river in the Jász-Nagykun-Szolnok county's northwestern region.

== Public life ==
Mayors

- 1990–1994: Ménkű Miklós (independent)
- 1994–1998: Ménkű Miklós (independent)
- 1998–2002: Ménkű Miklós (independent)
- 2002–2006: Rimóczi Sándor (independent)
- 2006–2010: Zelenai Tibor Károlyné (independent)
- 2010–2014: Zelenai Tibor Károlyné (independent)
- 2014–2019: Zelenai Tibor Károlyné (independent)
- 2019-present: Zelenai Tibor Károlyné (Fidesz-KDNP)

== Population ==
Year	1980	1990	2001	2010	2011	2013
Population	1,967 (census)	1,831 (census)	1,803 (census)	1,939 (estimate)	1,921 (census)	1,905 (estimate)

== Trivia ==
Jászfelsőszentgyörgy is the longest name of a city or village in Hungary.
