= Rákócziújfalu =

- Village
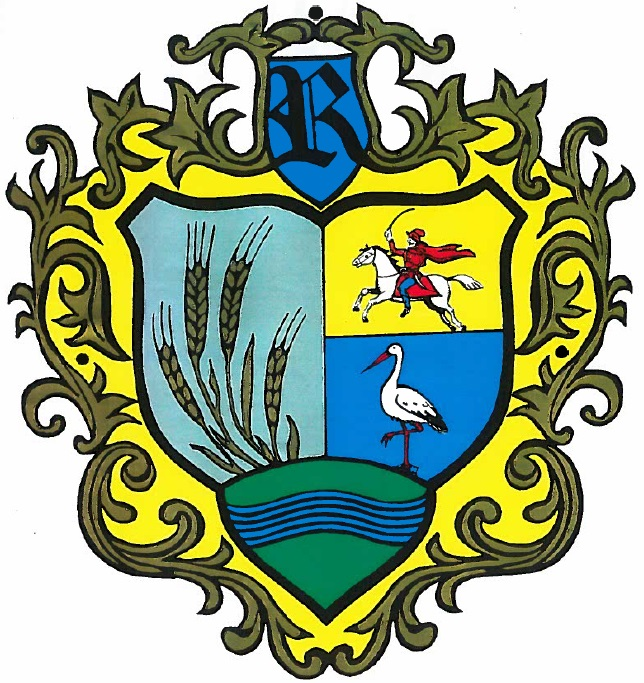
- Coat of arms

- Location within Hungary
- Coordinates: 47°4′1″N 20°16′1″E
- Country: Hungary
- County: Jász-Nagykun-Szolnok
- District: Szolnok

Area
  - Total: 19.61 km^{2} (7.57 sq mi)

Population (2015)
  - Total: 1,871
  - Density: 100.5/km^{2} (260/sq mi)
- Time zone: UTC+1 (CET)
  - Summer (DST): UTC+2 (CEST)
- Postal code: 5084
- Area code(s): (+36) 56

Rákócziújfalu is a village in Jász-Nagykun-Szolnok county, in the Northern Great Plain region of central Hungary.

== Geography ==
It covers an area of 19.61 km^{2} (8 sq mi) and has a population of 1871 people (2015).
