= Hunyadfalva =

- Village
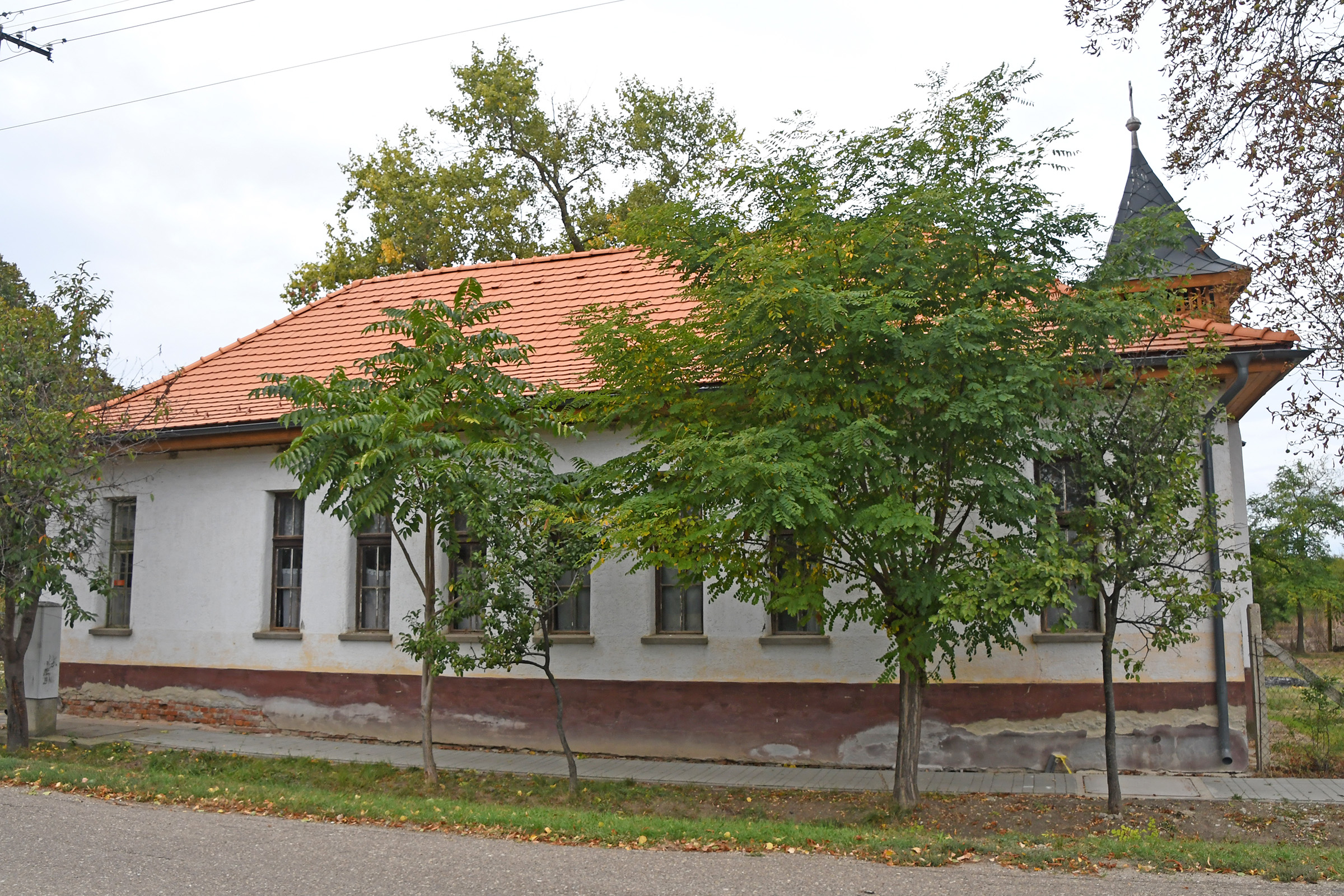
- Village hall

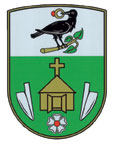
- Coat of arms

- Location within Hungary
- Coordinates: 47°19′1″N 20°22′59″E
- Country: Hungary
- County: Jász-Nagykun-Szolnok
- District: Szolnok

Area
  - Total: 5.35 km^{2} (2.07 sq mi)

Population (2016)
  - Total: 171
  - Density: 43/km^{2} (110/sq mi)
- Time zone: UTC+1 (CET)
  - Summer (DST): UTC+2 (CEST)
- Postal code: 5063
- Area code: (+36) 56

Hunyadfalva is a small village in Jász-Nagykun-Szolnok county, in the Northern Great Plain region of central Hungary.

== Geography ==
It covers an area of 71.48 km^{2} (28 sq mi).

== Population ==
It has a population of 230 people (2002).
