= Jászárokszállás =

- Town
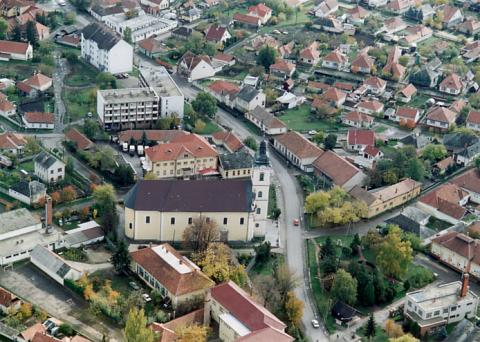
- Aerial photography of the town

- Flag Coat of arms

- Location of Jászárokszállás
- Coordinates: 47°38′31″N 19°58′43″E
- Country: Hungary
- County: Jász-Nagykun-Szolnok
- District: Jászberény

Area
  - Total: 77.17 km^{2} (29.80 sq mi)

Population (2016)
  - Total: 7,756
  - Density: 100.5/km^{2} (260.3/sq mi)
- Time zone: UTC+1 (CET)
  - Summer (DST): UTC+2 (CEST)
- Postal code: 5123
- Area code: (+36) 57
- Website: jaszarokszallas.hu

Jászárokszállás is a town in Jász-Nagykun-Szolnok county, in the Northern Great Plain region of central Hungary.

== Geography ==
It covers an area of 77.17 km^{2} (30 sq mi) and has a population of 7914 people (2014).

== History ==
First mention of Jászárokszállás was in the beginning of the 14th century.

== Sights and attractions ==
- The Faragó Mill in Jászárokszállás
- The Surányi Mill in Jászárokszállás
- Jászárokszállás Külső Fogadó (Széchenyi út 104.)
- Jászárokszállás Szentháromság Roman Catholic Church built between 1761 and 1767
- Town hall built in 1863 in romantic style
- Csörsz Vezér Hotel 'Nagyvendéglő' 1905 (Móczár Andor tér)
- Jász-ház 1882 - permanent ethnographic exhibition (Széchenyi út 31.)
- Industrial Association building
- Statue of Heroes in memory of the victims of the First World War 1924
- Jászárokszállás Thermal and Beach Bath
- Cubical statue 'Sculpture of Ignác Solymos' 1971
- World War II memorial stone
- Millennium Gate of Time
- 1956 revulution monument
- Workers' Fishing Association Jászárokszállás
- Lake Peres-lapos

== Notable people ==
- János Görbe (1912–1968), actor
- Ferenc Donáth (1913–1986), politician
- Sándor Csányi (1953-), banker, investor, business magnate, philanthropist
- József Sándor (1892–?), wrestler

== Twin towns – sister cities ==
Jászárokszállás is twinned with:

- Tarłów, Poland
