= Rákóczifalva =

- Town
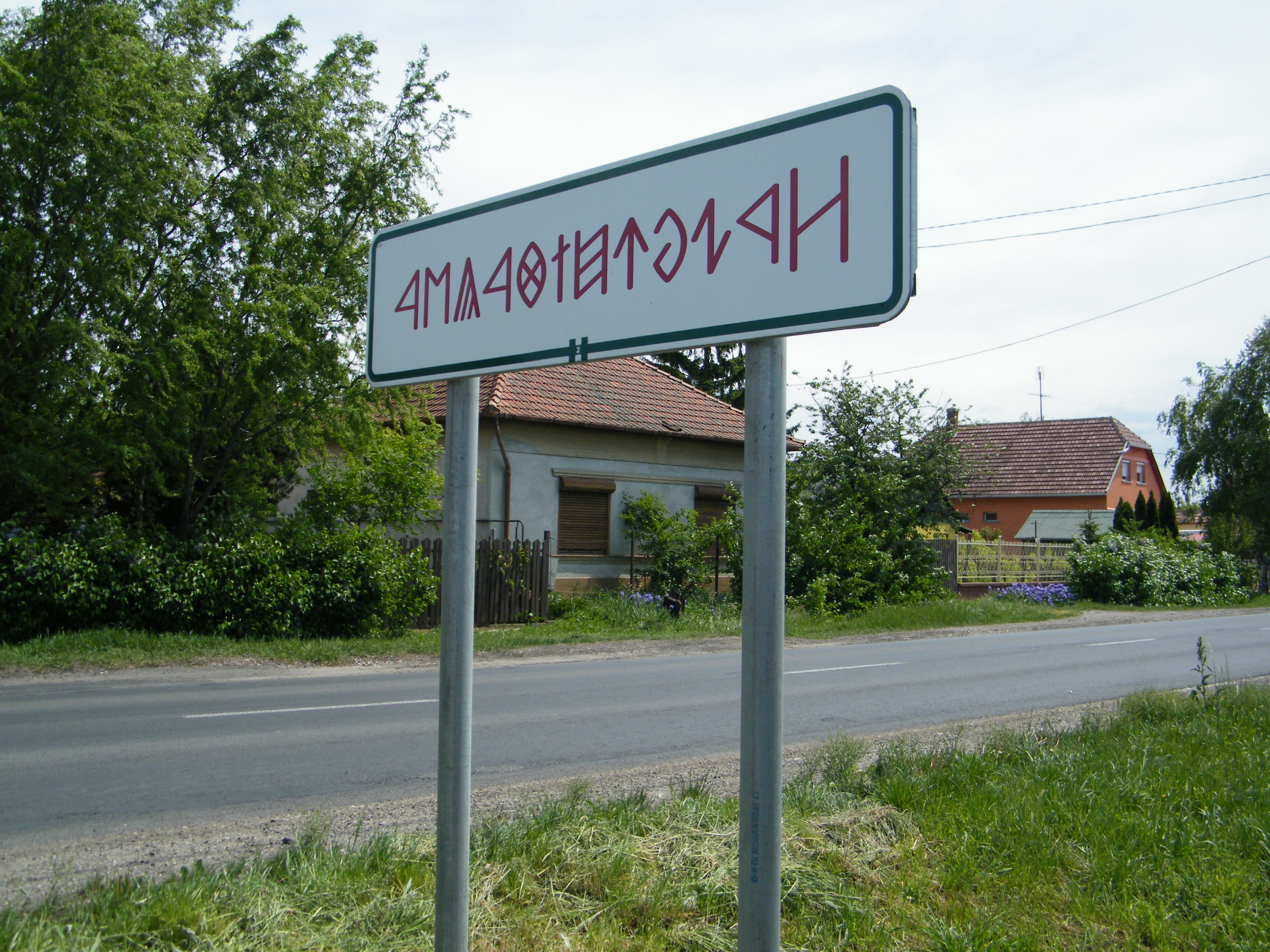
- City limit sign - traditional Hungarian letters.

- Flag Coat of arms

- Location of Rákóczifalva
- Coordinates: 47°5′35″N 20°13′44″E
- Country: Hungary
- County: Jász-Nagykun-Szolnok
- District: Szolnok

Area
  - Total: 35.94 km^{2} (13.88 sq mi)

Population (2015)
  - Total: 5,307
  - Density: 147.6/km^{2} (382/sq mi)
- Time zone: UTC+1 (CET)
  - Summer (DST): UTC+2 (CEST)
- Postal code: 5085
- Area code: (+36) 56
- Website: www.rakoczifalva.hu

Rákóczifalva is a town in Jász-Nagykun-Szolnok county, in the Northern Great Plain region of central Hungary.

== Geography ==
It covers an area of 35.94 km^{2} (14 sq mi) and has a population of 5,307 people (2015).

== International relations ==
Rákóczifalva is twinned with:

- Wierzchosławice, Poland
