= Tószeg =

- Village
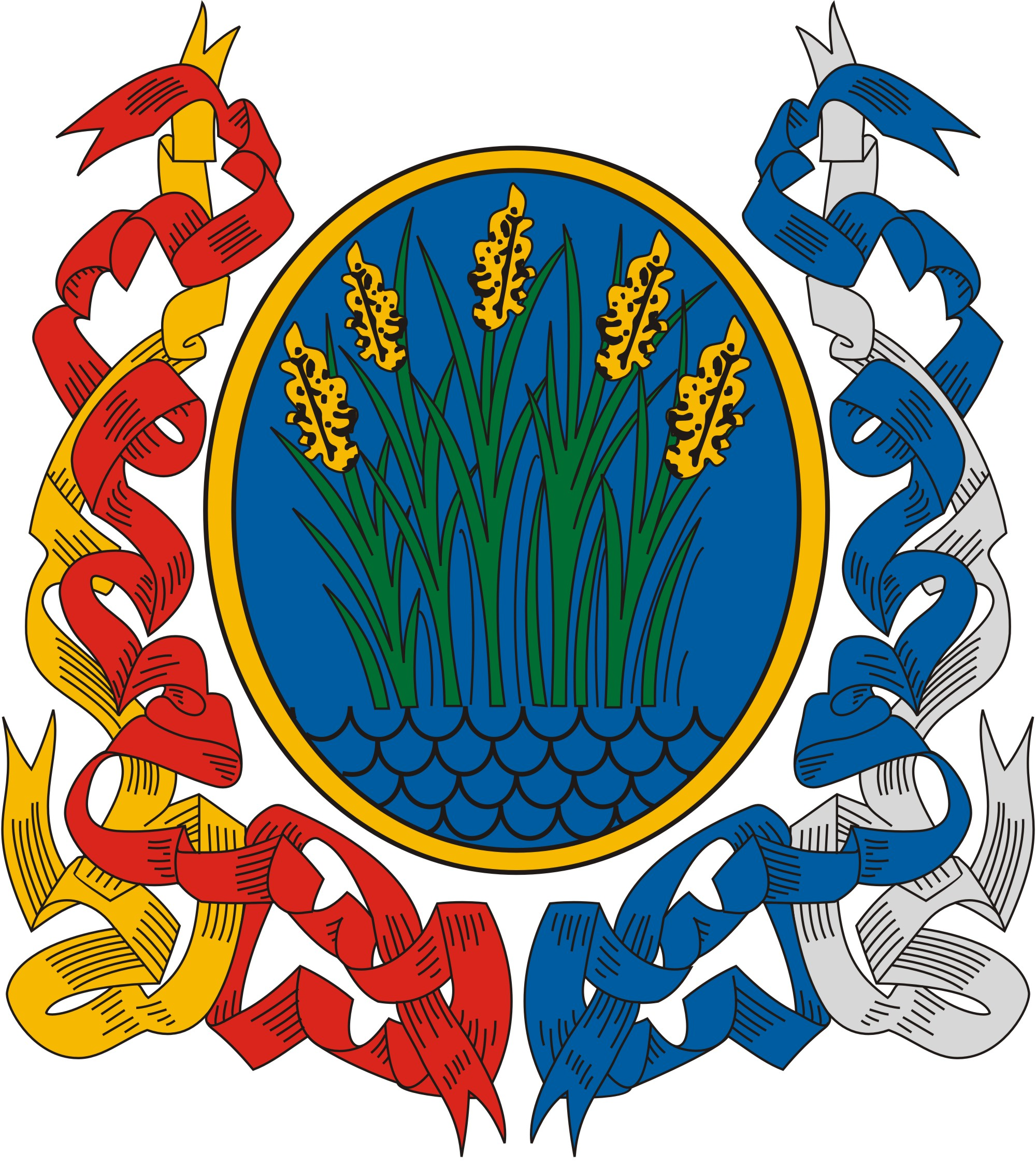
- Coat of arms

- Location within Hungary
- Coordinates: 47°5′49″N 20°8′24″E
- Country: Hungary
- County: Jász-Nagykun-Szolnok
- District: Szolnok

Area
  - Total: 59.17 km^{2} (22.85 sq mi)

Population (2015)
  - Total: 4,320
  - Density: 73/km^{2} (190/sq mi)
- Time zone: UTC+1 (CET)
  - Summer (DST): UTC+2 (CEST)
- Postal code: 5091
- Area code(s): (+36) 56

Tószeg is a village in Jász-Nagykun-Szolnok county, in the Northern Great Plain region of central Hungary.

== Geography ==
It covers an area of 59.17 km^{2} (23 sq mi) and had a population of 4,320 in 2015.

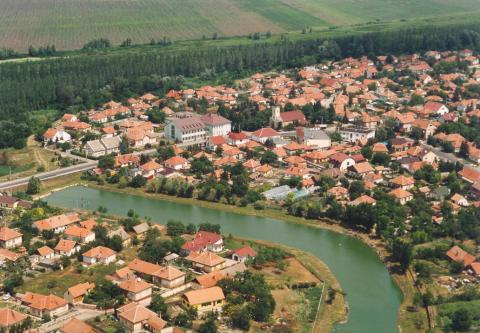
Aerial photography of Tószeg
