= Tiszajenő =

- Village
- Coat of arms

- Location within Hungary
- Coordinates: 47°1′30″N 20°8′35″E
- Country: Hungary
- County: Jász-Nagykun-Szolnok
- District: Szolnok

Area
  - Total: 28.19 km^{2} (10.88 sq mi)

Population (2016)
  - Total: 1,577
  - Density: 55.9/km^{2} (145/sq mi)
- Time zone: UTC+1 (CET)
  - Summer (DST): UTC+2 (CEST)
- Postal code: 5094
- Area code(s): (+36) 56

Tiszajenő is a village in Jász-Nagykun-Szolnok county, in the Northern Great Plain region of central Hungary.

== Geography ==
It covers an area of 28.19 km^{2} (11 sq mi) and has a population of 1576 people (2015).
