= Nagykörű =

- Village
- Coat of arms

- Location within Hungary
- Coordinates: 47°16′35″N 20°26′50″E
- Country: Hungary
- County: Jász-Nagykun-Szolnok
- District: Szolnok

Area
  - Total: 42.81 km^{2} (16.53 sq mi)

Population (2016)
  - Total: 1,557
  - Density: 38.93/km^{2} (100.8/sq mi)
- Time zone: UTC+1 (CET)
  - Summer (DST): UTC+2 (CEST)
- Postal code: 5065
- Area code(s): (+36) 56

Nagykörű is a village in Jász-Nagykun-Szolnok county, in the Northern Great Plain region of central Hungary.

== Location ==
The village is located on the right bank of River Tisza, 25 kilometres away to the northeast from Szolnok. It can be approached on road by scheduled overland bus from the west, by ferry from the direction of Fegyvernek (from the east), or by bicycle on Tisza-dam.

== History ==
Nagykörű got its name because it was almost completely compassed by Tisza before the river control. The settlement was rising as an isle among the neighboring river meadows. The first written document of Nagykörű monastery derives from year 1212. The village itself was founded at the beginning of the 14th century, and it belonged to the property of Ban Lothar of Gutkeled.

The estate called Kürümonostora was endowed by King Charles Robert in 1318 to Peter Kompolty, chamberlain of the queen. Owing to its geographic position, Nagykörű managed to survive the Turkish rule successfully. According to the legend, the Turkish troops were lost in the marsh on 19 July 1530 (day of Elijah). After expelling Turks, the Treasury and an Austrian officer called Enczinger became holders of the village.

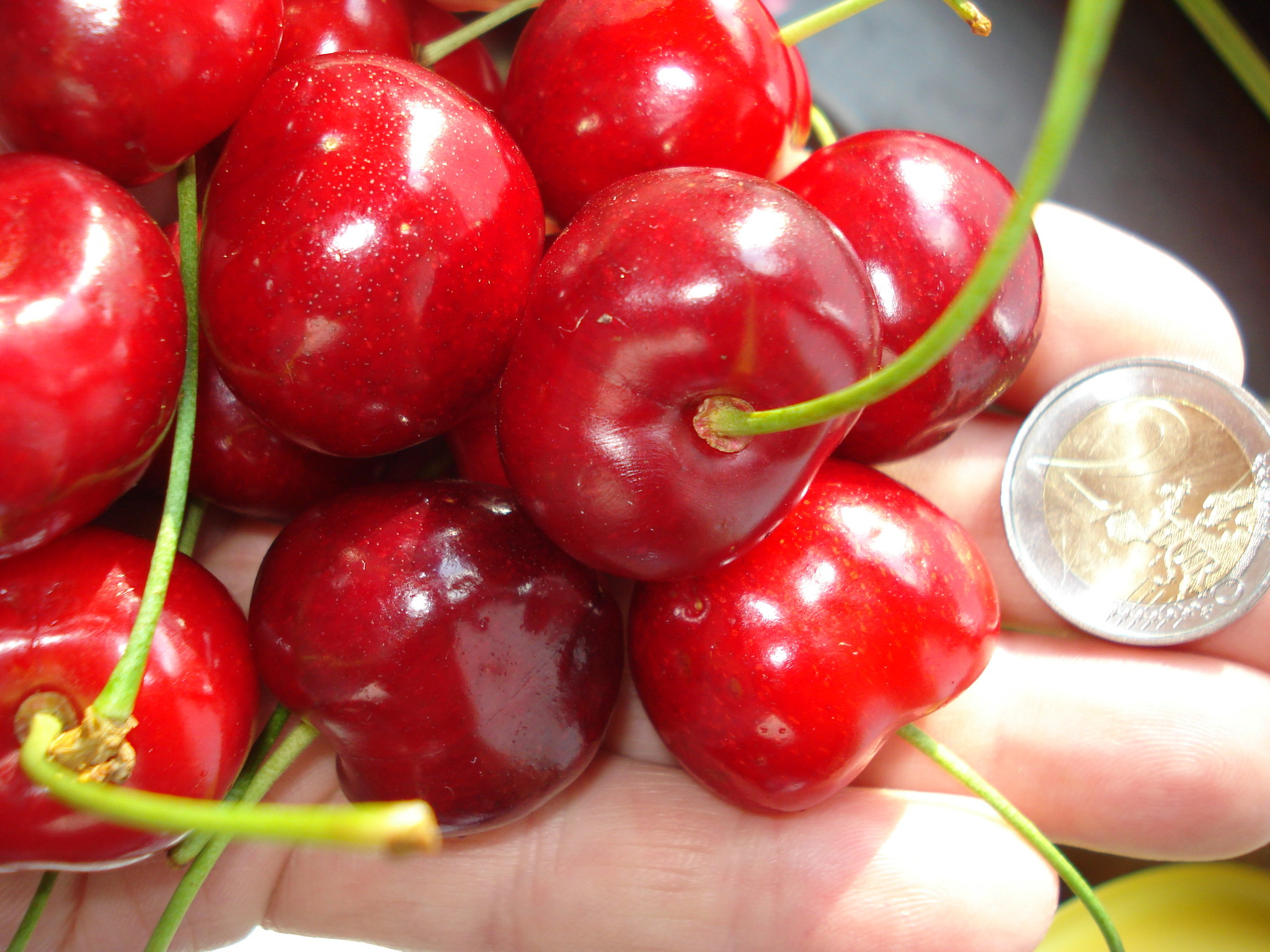
Germersdorf cherries

In the middle of 18th century, Nagykörű started to develop spectacularly. The first vineyard was planted on Homok (sandy soil) by Baron Lőrinc Orczy in 1751. Thanks to landlord György Petrovay, this place became the cultivation area of the famous Germersdorf cherry in the second half of 19th century. Nagykörű owns title "Cherry garden of Hungary" as the biggest (200 hectares) cherry garden of the country can be found here. Cherry of Nagykörű is a trade-mark.

== Ethnic groups ==
In 2001, according to the census, 94 percent of the population avowed themselves Hungarian, while 6 percent of the population avowed themselves Roma.

== The present ==
Worldwide famous cherry of Nagykörű is considered to be the cost-of-living source of inhabitants. Cherry is principally grown for export. Meanwhile, villageous tourism is also prospering. The ratio of resident population is decreasing, whereas fourth of the houses are used as holiday resorts. The surrounding neighborhood is a real paradise for tourists, line-fishermen, and bathers.
