= Tiszavirág bridge =

Footbridge in Szolnok, Hungary

Coordinates: 47°10′12.13″N 20°11′34.14″E

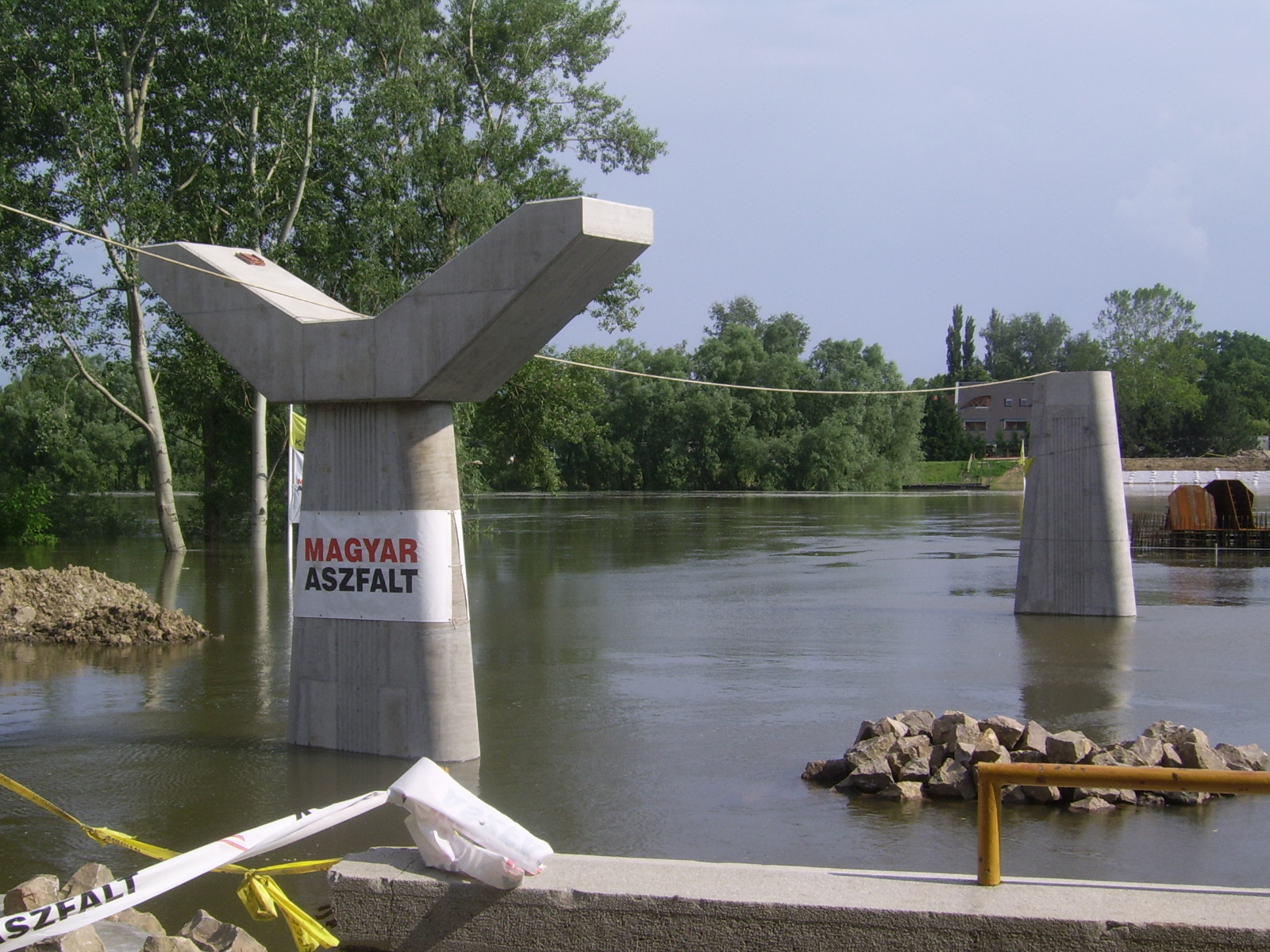
Tiszavirág bridge in construction

Tiszavirág híd (Mayfly Bridge) is a pedestrian and cyclist bridge in Szolnok, Hungary on the Tisza river.

== History ==
The project was completed under the program called "Szolnok, the Capital of Tisza". The European Union supported the HUF 5 billion project by 1.5 billion forint, of which 2 billion forints went to the bridge and the new decorative square at the northern end of the bridge, which was assigned to Közgép Zrt. The bridge was meant to be the new landmark of the county town. The bridge has a shape resembling a mayfly or "tiszavirág" in Hungarian.

The bridge weighs 550 tons and is 444 meters long, which makes it the longest pedestrian bridge in Central Europe. It was officially inaugurated on 21 January 2011.

=== Laying the Foundation Stone ===
The foundation stone of the bridge was laid on August 9, 2009. The foundation stone was in fact a time capsule which contained not only that day's newspapers and some CDs but also the brief messages of the passers-by.

=== The Construction ===
Groundwork began at the end of September 2009. By the end of December, the right-bank deep foundation of the bridge was completed but due to the unusually cold winter and the flood, works had to be suspended on site. The bridge structure was made in Budapest and in lack of time it was also assembled there which made the 390-ton steel structure incapable of being transported on the road. Therefore, the whole structure was put on two barges that transported it first down to Titel, Serbia and then upstream on the Tisza back to Szolnok; this meant a total route of 500 river kilometers. The bridge components were sent off from Budapest on 23 July 2010 and – after some waiting at Szeged due to the high water levels – arrived in Szolnok on August 17. Thus, the inauguration originally planned for September 1 had to be postponed. The technical delivery and acceptance started on November 29 and it should have been delivered to the public on December 17 but this deadline could not be met, either.

One man, aged 49, working on the bridge fell into the Tisza on September 17 and his body was found only some days later.

=== The Inauguration ===
The bridge was finally delivered – 151 days later than originally scheduled – on January 21, 2011. There was a crowd of about 2,000 people gathering at the World War I monument for the celebration that started at 3 p.m. The bridge was consecrated by the Bishop of Vác then, according to the tradition, a beer barrel was rolled over the bridge. Also a 16-year local girl named Tisza Virág gave memorial documents to the builders. At 5 p.m. the bridge was celebrated with a firework and the first crossers received a piece of the inauguration ribbon.

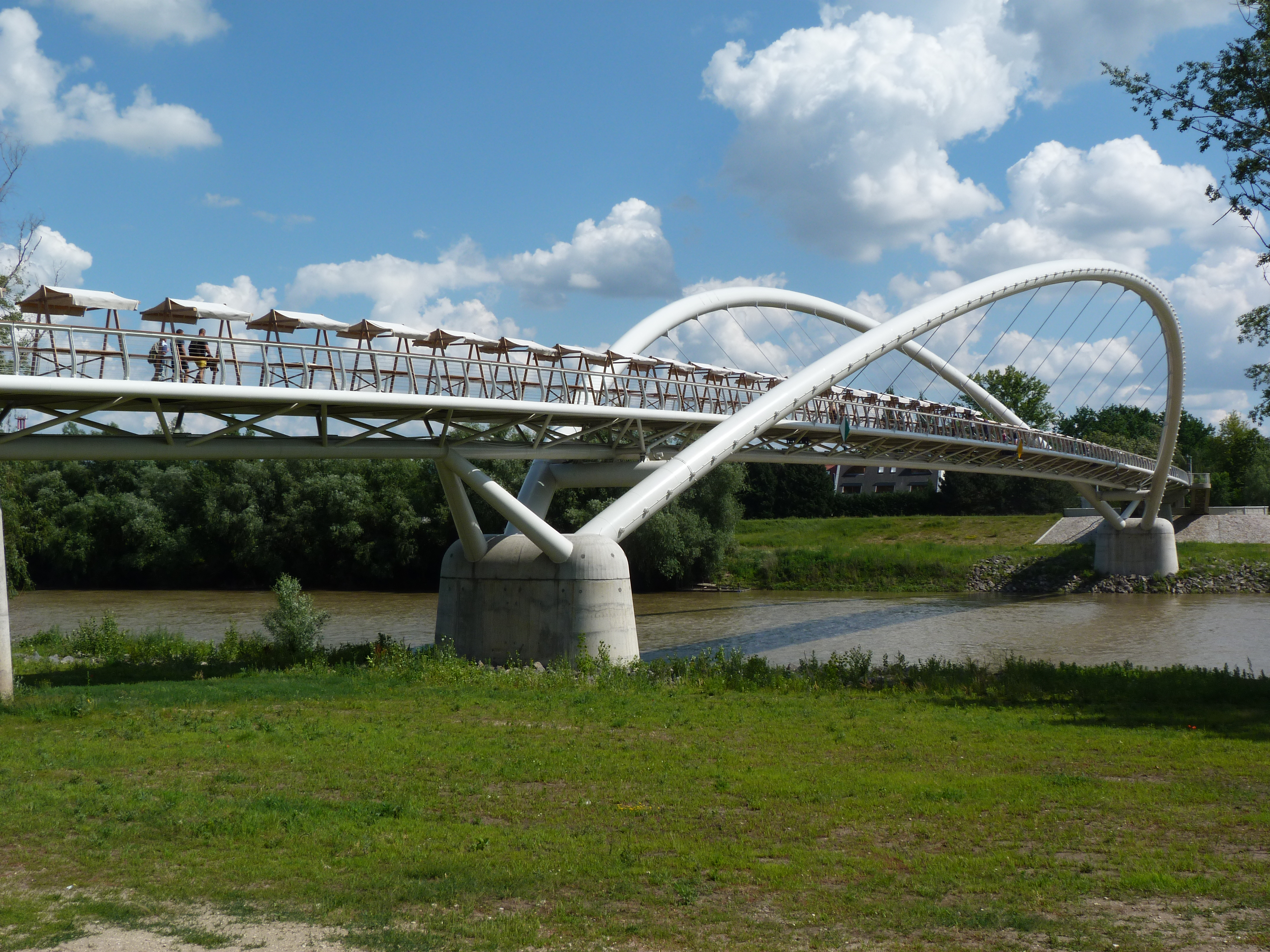
Tiszavirág bridge, Szolnok, Hungary

== The Design Concept ==
Quotation from the website of the bridge:

"The pedestrian bridge resembles a mayfly in its design in that its (60°) outward leaning arches together with the pattern of the cables represent the wing, the truss divided by the grid symbolizes the ribbed body which continues towards the city in the "tail" section that is the longer access bridge. As a result, the bridge has a gracious and ethereal structure. [...] The low amplitude arch renders tension and elegance to the form, the technical challenge becomes apparent and reflects our time; it can also become a symbol of our era."

== Technical data ==
Crossing location on the Tisza	334+845 River kilometer
Bridge width	5.0 m
Capacity	11,750 people/hour
Total Weight	550 t
Bridge lengths
Left bank ramp	39 m
Left bank access bridge	95 m
River bridge	186 m
Right bank access bridge	38 m
Right bank ramp	87 m
Total span	445 m
Steel Structure
Main Supporting Arches	200 t
Truss	148 t
Pillar junction	32 t
Total	380 t
Lighting
Total Cabling	2,620 m
Corinthian columns with LED lights	75 units
Bridge lights	945 lights

== Resources ==
- Doros Judit (2009-08-24). "Népszabadság – Tiszavirág, a szolnoki gyaloghíd".
- MTI (2009-08-10). "Szolnok megújulásához gyaloghídon át vezet az út".
- "Városi ünnep lesz a gyalogoshíd alapkőletételének napján". Szolnoki Grátisz. XIII (29). Szolnok: Axel Springer-Magyarország: 1. 2009-07-30. ISSN 1786-1748.
- "Épülhet a gyaloghíd!". Szolnoki Grátisz. XIII (31). Szolnok: Axel Springer-Magyarország: 1. 2009-08-13. ISSN 1786-1748.
- "Új szállítási elképzelés: Dunára kerül a Tiszavirág". Szolnoki Grátisz. XIV (4). Szolnok: Axel Springer-Magyarország Kft.: 1 2010-02-04. ISSN 1786-1748.

== See also ==
- List of bridges in Hungary
