= Besenyszög =

- Town
- Flag Coat of arms

- Location within Hungary
- Coordinates: 47°17′50″N 20°15′34″E
- Country: Hungary
- County: Jász-Nagykun-Szolnok
- District: Szolnok

Area
  - Total: 138.08 km^{2} (53.31 sq mi)

Population (2015)
  - Total: 3,279
  - Density: 23.7/km^{2} (61/sq mi)
- Time zone: UTC+1 (CET)
  - Summer (DST): UTC+2 (CEST)
- Postal code: 5071
- Area code: (+36) 56
- Website: www.besenyszog.hu

Besenyszög is a town in Jász-Nagykun-Szolnok county, in the Northern Great Plain region of central Hungary.

== Geography ==
It covers an area of 138.08 km^{2} (53 sq mi) and has a population of 3279 people (2015).

== International relations ==
Besenyszög is twinned with:

- Weidenbach, Germany; since 2014
