= Jásztelek =

- Village
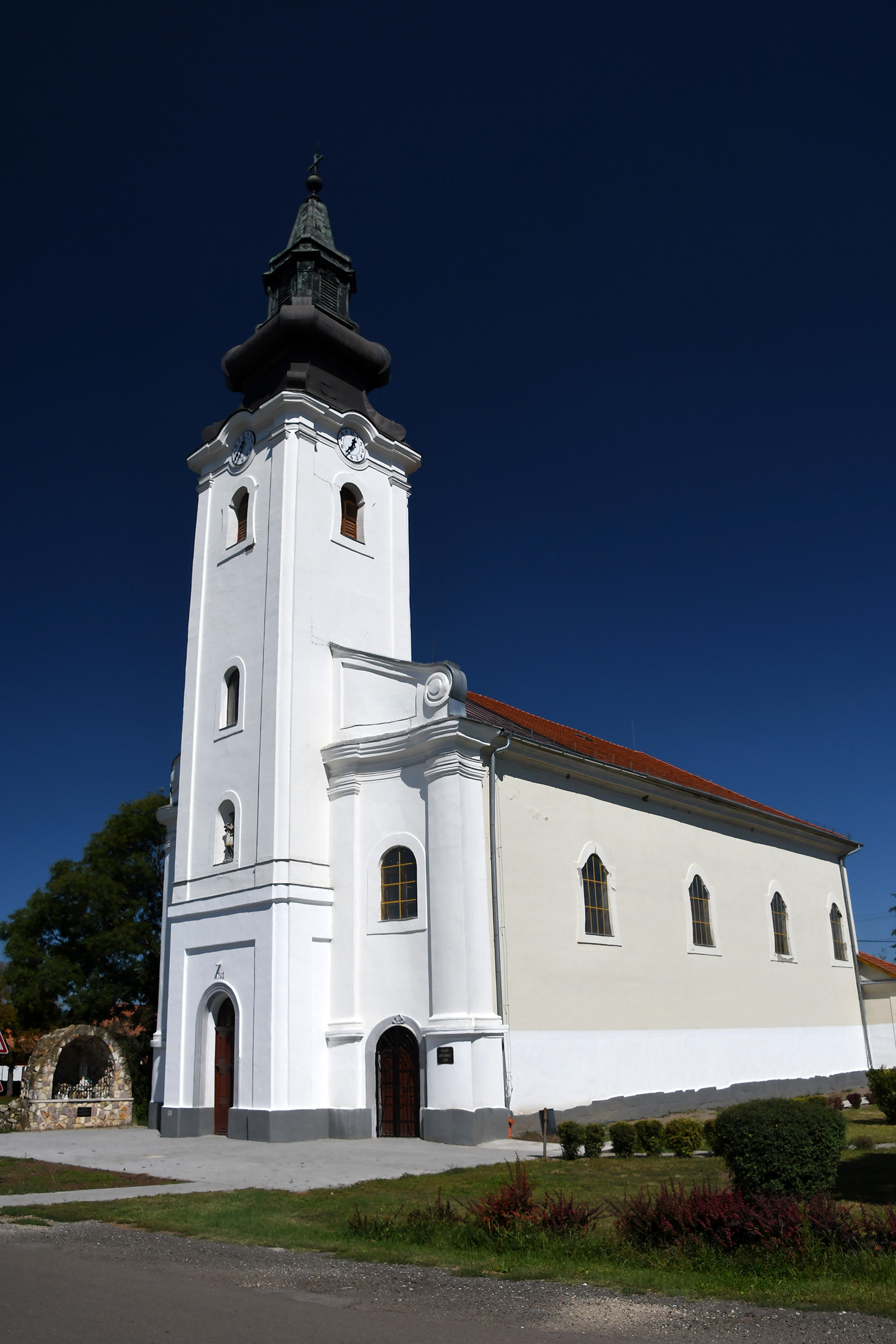
- Church of Saint Martin

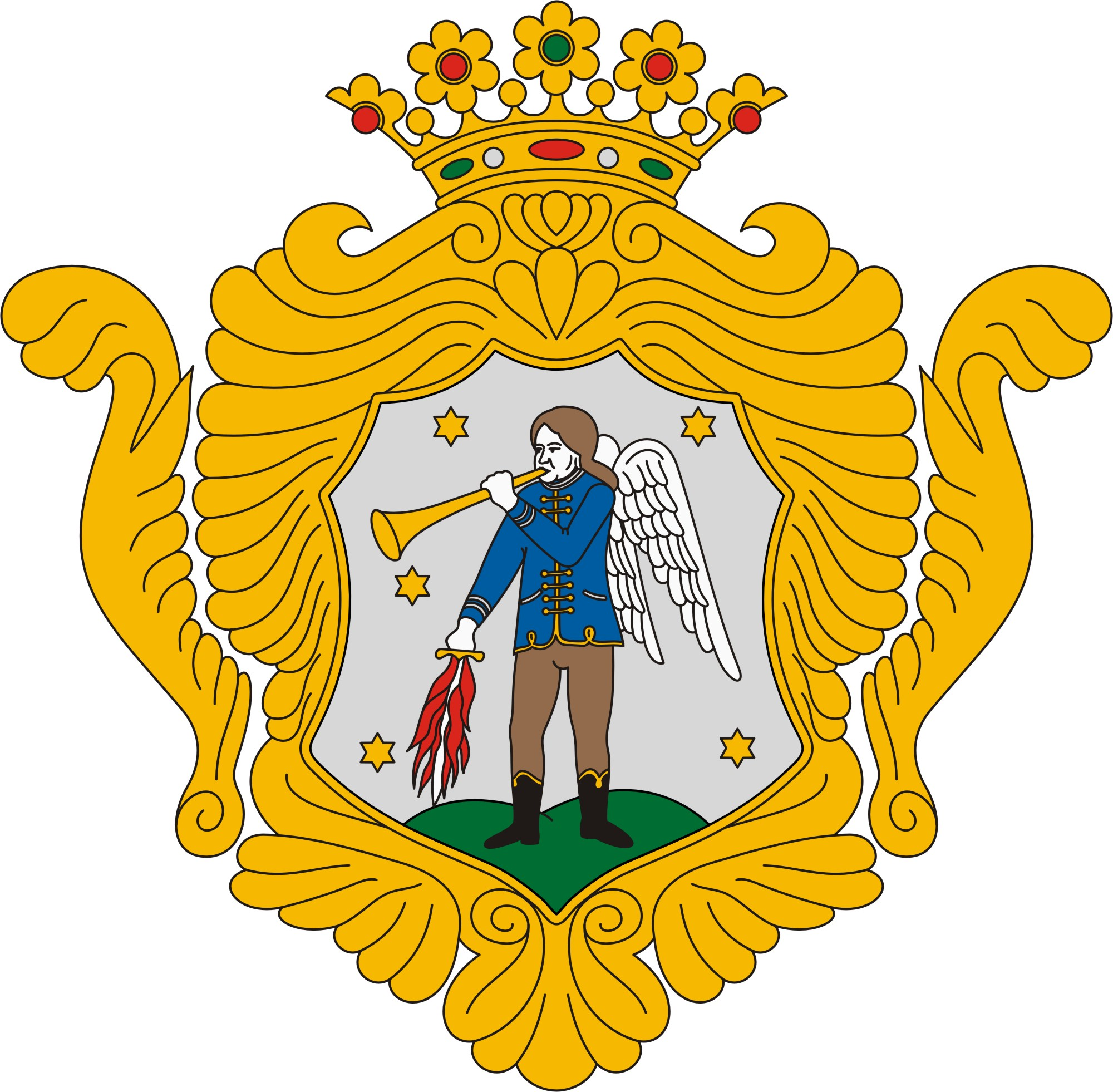
- Coat of arms

- Location within Hungary
- Coordinates: 47°28′56″N 20°00′04″E
- Country: Hungary
- County: Jász-Nagykun-Szolnok
- District: Jászberény

Area
  - Total: 41.16 km^{2} (15.89 sq mi)

Population (2001)
  - Total: 1,770
  - Density: 43/km^{2} (110/sq mi)
- Time zone: UTC+1 (CET)
  - Summer (DST): UTC+2 (CEST)
- Postal code: 5141
- Area code(s): (+36) 57
- Website: https://jasztelek.asp.lgov.hu/

Jásztelek is a village in Jász-Nagykun-Szolnok county, in the Northern Great Plain region of central Hungary.

== Geography ==
It covers an area of 41.16 km^{2} (16 sq mi) and has a population of 1770 people (2001).
