= Pusztamonostor =

- Village
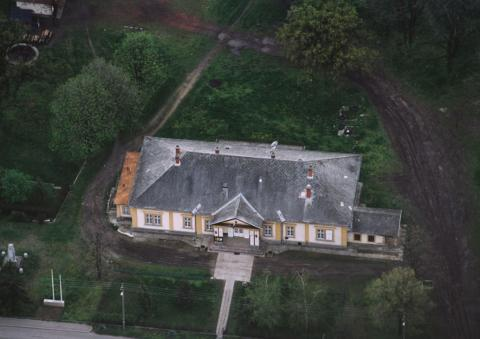
- Balázsovich Mansion

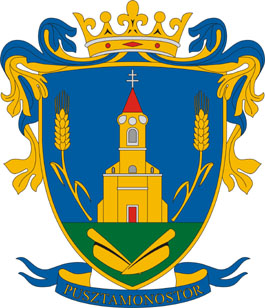
- Coat of arms

- Location within Hungary
- Coordinates: 47°33′25″N 19°47′49″E
- Country: Hungary
- County: Jász-Nagykun-Szolnok
- District: Jászberény

Area
  - Total: 24.62 km^{2} (9.51 sq mi)

Population (2002)
  - Total: 1,664
  - Density: 68/km^{2} (180/sq mi)
- Time zone: UTC+1 (CET)
  - Summer (DST): UTC+2 (CEST)
- Postal code: 5125
- Area code(s): (+36) 57

Pusztamonostor is a village in Jász-Nagykun-Szolnok county, in the Northern Great Plain region of central Hungary. Near Pusztamonostor, there is the Jászberény Shortwave Transmitter, the largest shortwave broadcasting station in Hungary.

== Geography ==
It covers an area of 24.62 km^{2} (10 sq mi) and has a population of 1664 people (2002).
