= Zagyvarékas =

- Village
- Coat of arms

- Location within Hungary
- Coordinates: 47°16′0″N 20°8′0″E
- Country: Hungary
- County: Jász-Nagykun-Szolnok
- District: Szolnok

Government
  - Mayor: Kurucz László (Ind.)

Area
  - Total: 31.71 km^{2} (12.24 sq mi)

Population (2022)
  - Total: 3,557
  - Density: 112.2/km^{2} (290.5/sq mi)
- Time zone: UTC+1 (CET)
  - Summer (DST): UTC+2 (CEST)
- Postal code: 5051
- Area code(s): (+36) 56

Zagyvarékas is a village in Jász-Nagykun-Szolnok county, in the Northern Great Plain region of central Hungary.

== Geography ==
It covers an area of 31.71 km^{2} (12 sq mi) and has a population of 3,557 people (2022).
