= Újszász =

- Town
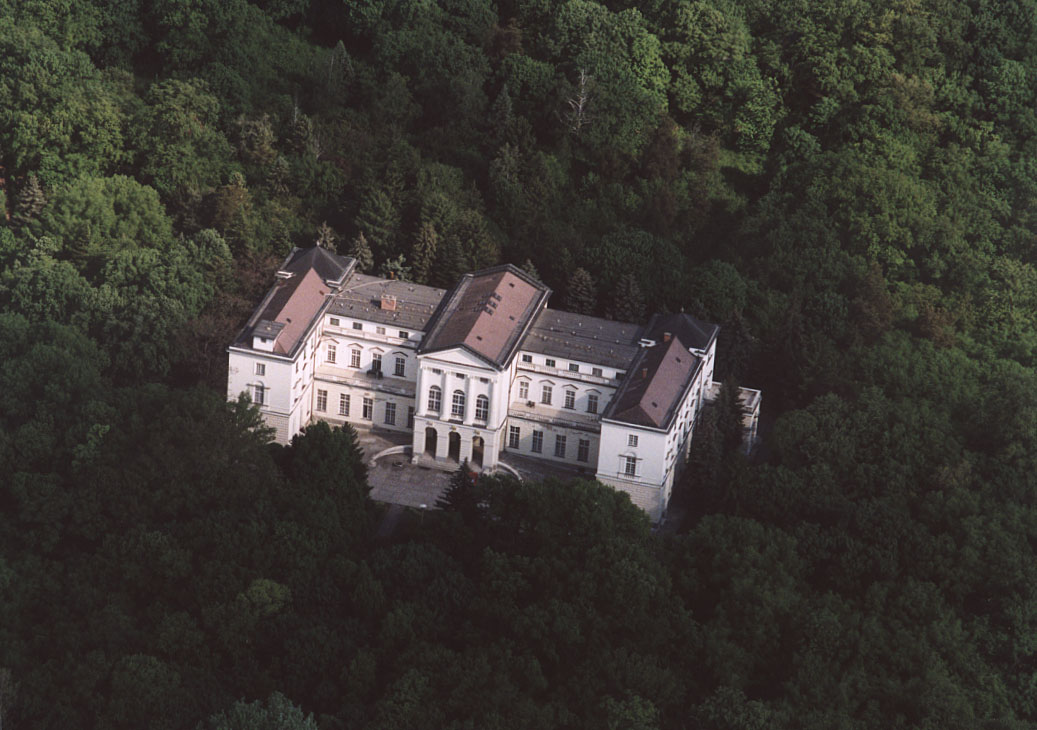
- Orczy Palace

- Flag Coat of arms

- Location of Újszász
- Coordinates: 47°18′0″N 20°5′0″E
- Country: Hungary
- County: Jász-Nagykun-Szolnok
- District: Szolnok

Area
  - Total: 58.2 km^{2} (22.5 sq mi)

Population (2015)
  - Total: 6,153
  - Density: 105.7/km^{2} (274/sq mi)
- Time zone: UTC+1 (CET)
  - Summer (DST): UTC+2 (CEST)
- Postal code: 5052
- Area code: (+36) 56
- Website: www.ujszasz.hu

Újszász is a town in Jász-Nagykun-Szolnok county, in the Northern Great Plain region of central Hungary.

== Geography ==
It covers an area of 58.2 km^{2} (22 sq mi) and has a population of 6153 people (2015).

== Twin towns – sister cities ==
Újszász is twinned with:

- Auzeville-Tolosane, France (1997)
- Ciceu, Romania (2005)
- Gmina Dębica, Poland (2004)
- Palić (Subotica), Serbia (2013)
