= Csongrád-Csanád County =

County of Hungary

Coordinates: 46°25′N 20°15′E

Csongrád-Csanád County Csongrád-Csanád megye
- Counties of Hungary
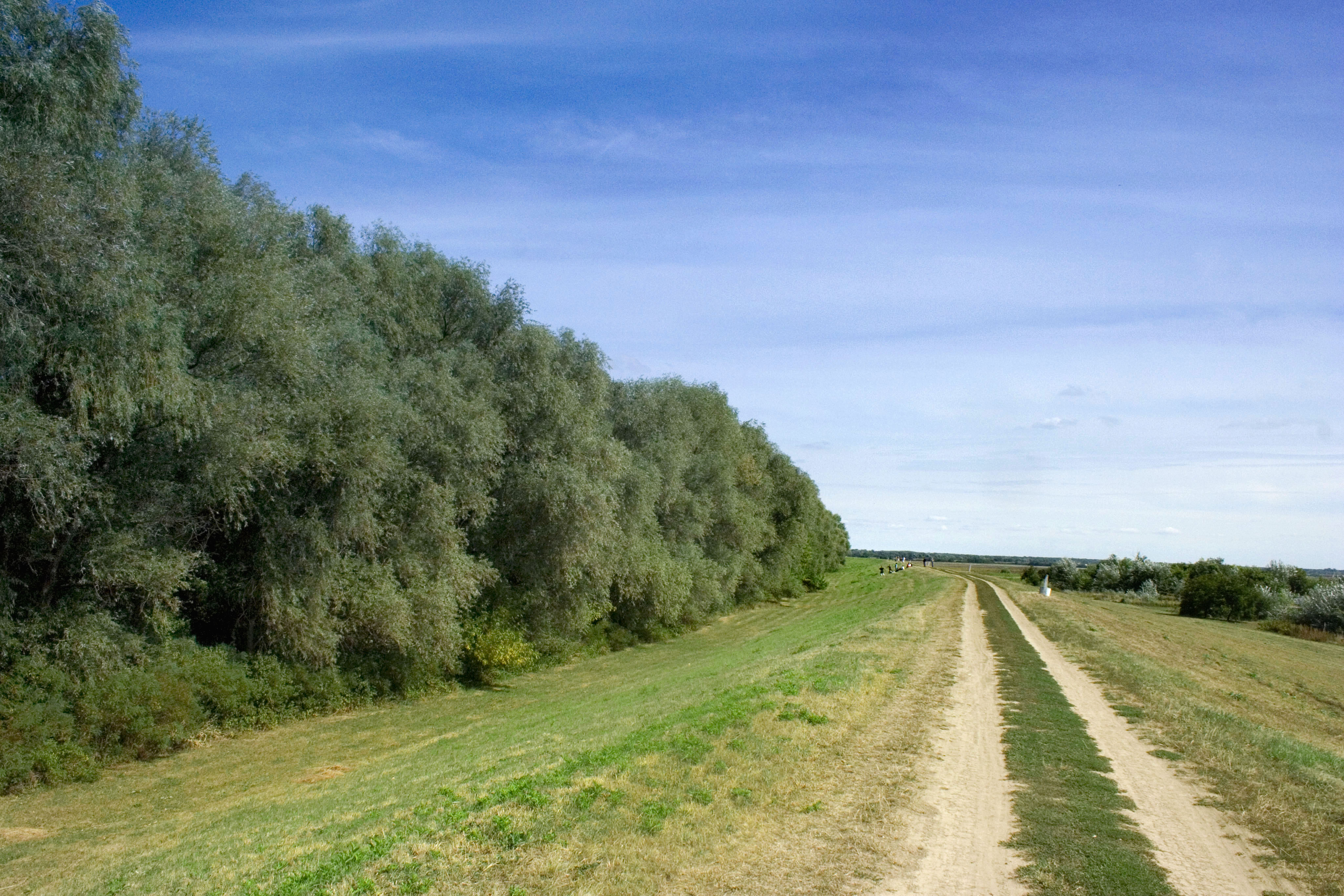
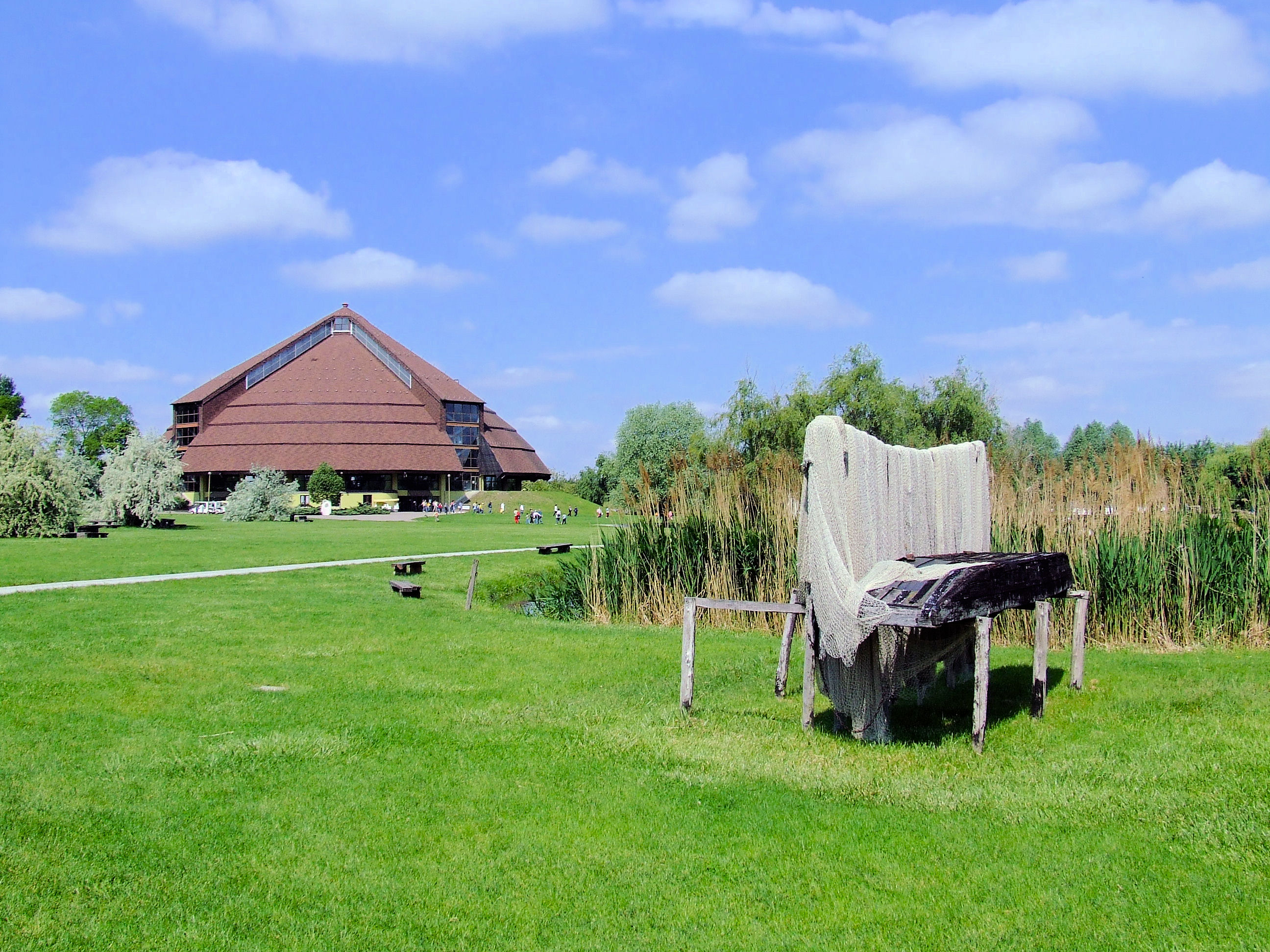
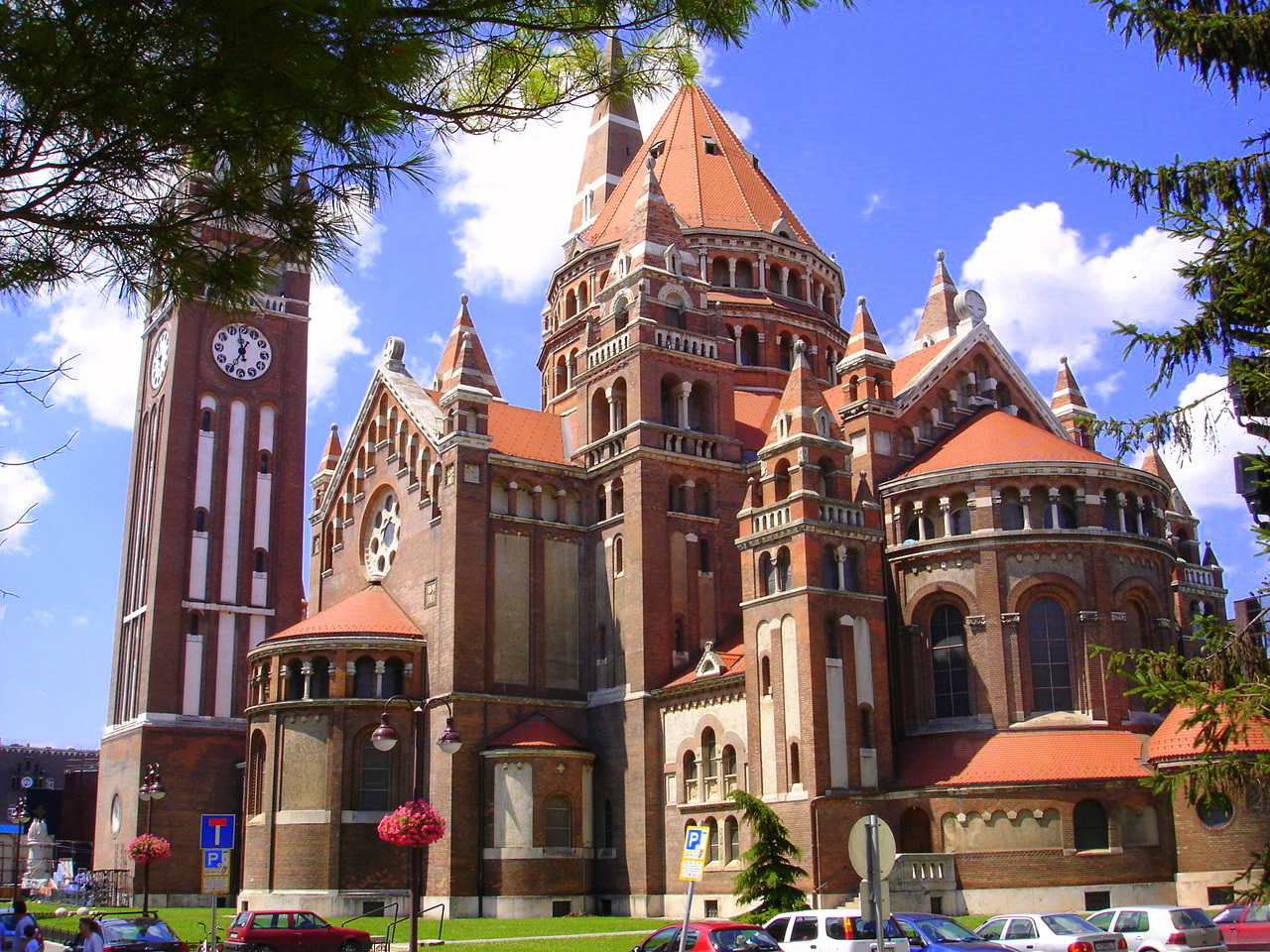
- Descending, from top: Maros river embankment near Makó, Ópusztaszer National Heritage Park, and Cathedral of Szeged

- Flag Coat of arms

- Csongrád-Csanád County within Hungary
- Country: Hungary
- Region: Southern Great Plain
- County seat: Szeged
- Districts: 7 districts: Csongrád District; Hódmezővásárhely District; Kistelek District; Makó District; Mórahalom District; Szeged District; Szentes District

Government
  - President of the General Assembly: Béla Kakas (Fidesz-KDNP)

Area
  - Total: 4,262.71 km^{2} (1,645.84 sq mi)
  - Rank: 12th in Hungary

Population (2018)
  - Total: 400,238
  - Rank: 8th in Hungary
  - Density: 93.8929/km^{2} (243.181/sq mi)

GDP
  - Total: HUF 1,091 billion €3.504 billion (2016)
- Postal code: 66xx – 69xx
- Area code(s): (+36) 62, 63
- ISO 3166 code: HU-CS
- Website: csongrad-megye.hu

Csongrád-Csanád (Hungarian: Csongrád-Csanád megye [ˈt͡ʃoŋɡraːd ˈt͡ʃɒnaːd]; German: Komitat Tschongrad-Tschanad; Romanian: Județul Ciongrad-Cenad; Serbian: Чонградско-чанадска жупанија) is an administrative county (comitatus or megye) in southern Hungary, straddling the river Tisza, on the border with Serbia and Romania. It shares borders with the Hungarian counties Bács-Kiskun County, Jász-Nagykun-Szolnok County and Békés. The administrative centre of Csongrád-Csanád county is Szeged. The county is also part of the Danube–Criș–Mureș–Tisa Euroregion.

== History ==
On October 3, 2017, the Hungarian Parliament passed a resolution to rename Csongrád County to Csongrád-Csanád County, which took effect on June 4, 2020. The resolution was submitted by János Lázár, then-Minister of the Prime Minister's Office, who called the renaming symbolic as more than a dozen settlements in the area still share Csanád County's identity.

== Geography ==
This county has a total area of 4,263 km^{2} (1,646 sq mi) – 4,58% of Hungary.

The area of Csongrád-Csanád County is flat. It has a high number of sunshine hours and excellent soil, which makes it the most important agricultural area of Hungary. Its most famous products are paprika from Szeged and onions from Makó, but grain, vegetables, and fruits are also significant. Half of the onions, paprika, and vegetables produced in Hungary are from Csongrád-Csanád. The county is also rich in oil and natural gas.

The highest point is Ásotthalom (125 m), the lowest is Gyálarét (78 m; lowest point of Hungary).

=== Neighbours ===
- Jász-Nagykun-Szolnok County in the North.
- Békés County in the East.
- Romania and Serbia in the South – Timiș County, Arad County, North Banat District and North Bačka District
- Bács-Kiskun County in the West.

== Demographics ==
After the end of the Ottoman occupation in 1715, the county was nearly uninhabited, with a population density of less than 5/km^{2}. In the 18th and 19th centuries, the county was repopulated by ethnic Hungarians from the relatively overpopulated northern and western counties of the Kingdom of Hungary. According to the 2001 census, the county is home for 423,826 people (216,936 people live in urban counties) with a population density is 100/km^{2}. It has a Hungarian majority.

In 2015, it had a population of 406,205 and the population density was 95/km^{2}.

Historical population

Year	Pop.	±%
1870	269,803	—
1880	286,636	+6.2%
1890	327,273	+14.2%
1900	363,821	+11.2%
1910	395,361	+8.7%
1920	407,831	+3.2%

Year	Pop.	±%
1930	426,374	+4.5%
1941	434,749	+2.0%
1949	429,083	−1.3%
1960	434,046	+1.2%
1970	445,220	+2.6%
1980	456,300	+2.5%

Year	Pop.	±%
1990	438,842	−3.8%
2001	433,344	−1.3%
2011	417,456	−3.7%
2022	391,184	−6.3%

Source: Censuses

=== Ethnicity ===
Religion in Csongrád-Csanád County (2022 census – of those who declared their religion (58.1%)
1. Roman Catholic (47.8%)
2. Greek Catholic (0.80%)
3. Calvinistic (9.60%)
4. Lutheran (1.30%)
5. Other Christian denomination (4.60%)
6. Other religion (0.70%)
7. Not religious (35.2%)

Besides the Hungarian majority, the main minorities are the Roma (approx. 5,000), Romanian (1,500), German (1,300) and Serb (1,300).

Total population (2011 census): 417,456
Ethnic groups (2011 census): Identified themselves: 367,193 persons:

- Hungarians: 355,554 (96.83%)
- Gypsies: 4,720 (1.29%)
- Others and indefinable: 6,919 (1.88%)

Approximately 59,000 persons in Csongrád-Csanád County did not declare their ethnic group on the 2011 census.

=== Religion ===
Religious adherence in the county according to the 2011 census:

- Catholic – 165,955 (Roman Catholic – 164,060; Greek Catholic – 1,855);
- Reformed – 29,289;
- Evangelical – 3,488;
- Orthodox – 923;
- Judaism – 263;
- Other religions – 7,278;
- Non-religious – 90,836;
- Atheism – 6,585;
- Undeclared – 112,839.

== Regional structure ==
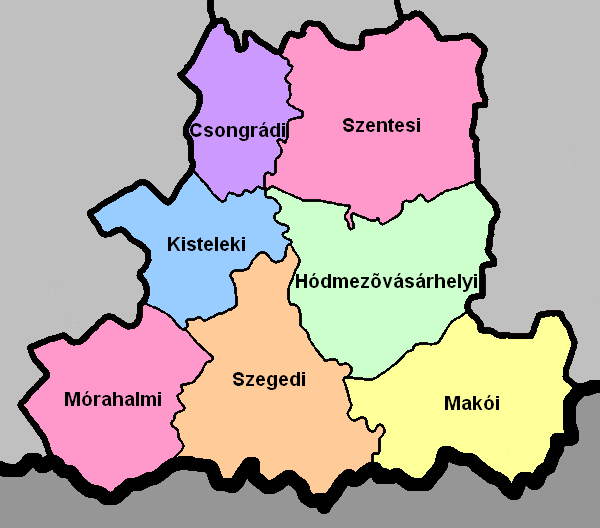
Districts of Csongrád-Csanád County

No.	English and Hungarian names	Area (km^{2})	Population (2011)	Density (pop./km^{2})	Seat	No. of municipalities
1	Csongrád District; Csongrádi járás	339.24	22,996	68	Csongrád (town)	4
2	Hódmezővásárhely District; Hódmezővásárhelyi járás	707.77	56,560	80	Hódmezővásárhely	4
3	Kistelek District; Kisteleki járás	410.20	18,185	44	Kistelek	6
4	Makó District; Makói járás	688.85	45,138	66	Makó	15
5	Mórahalom District; Mórahalmi járás	561.71	28,986	52	Mórahalom	10
6	Szeged District; Szegedi járás	741.10	204,263	276	Szeged	13
7	Szentes District; Szentesi járás	813.84	41,328	51	Szentes	8
Csongrád-Csanád County		4,262.71	417,456	98	Szeged	60

== Transport ==
=== Road network ===
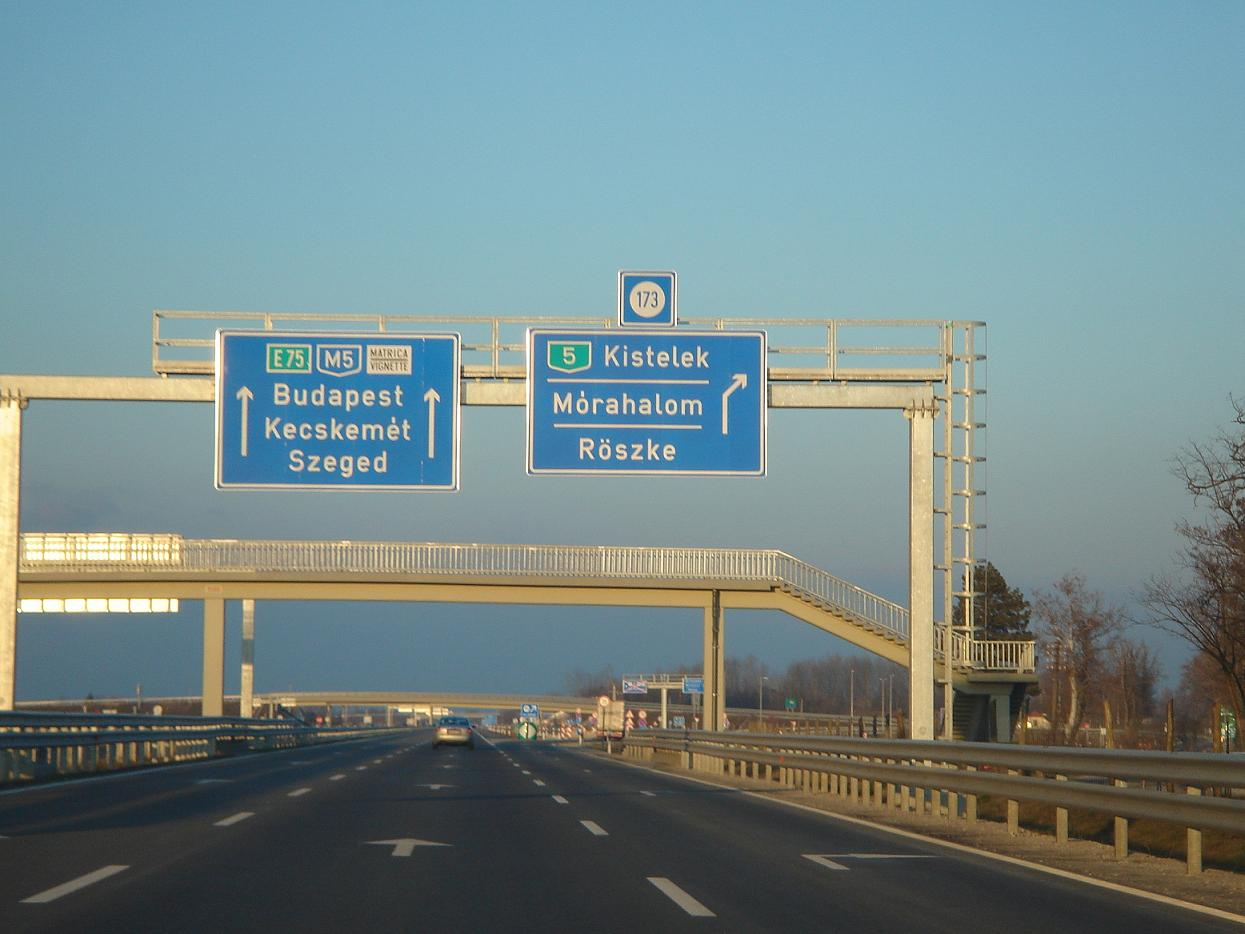
M5 motorway near Röszke.

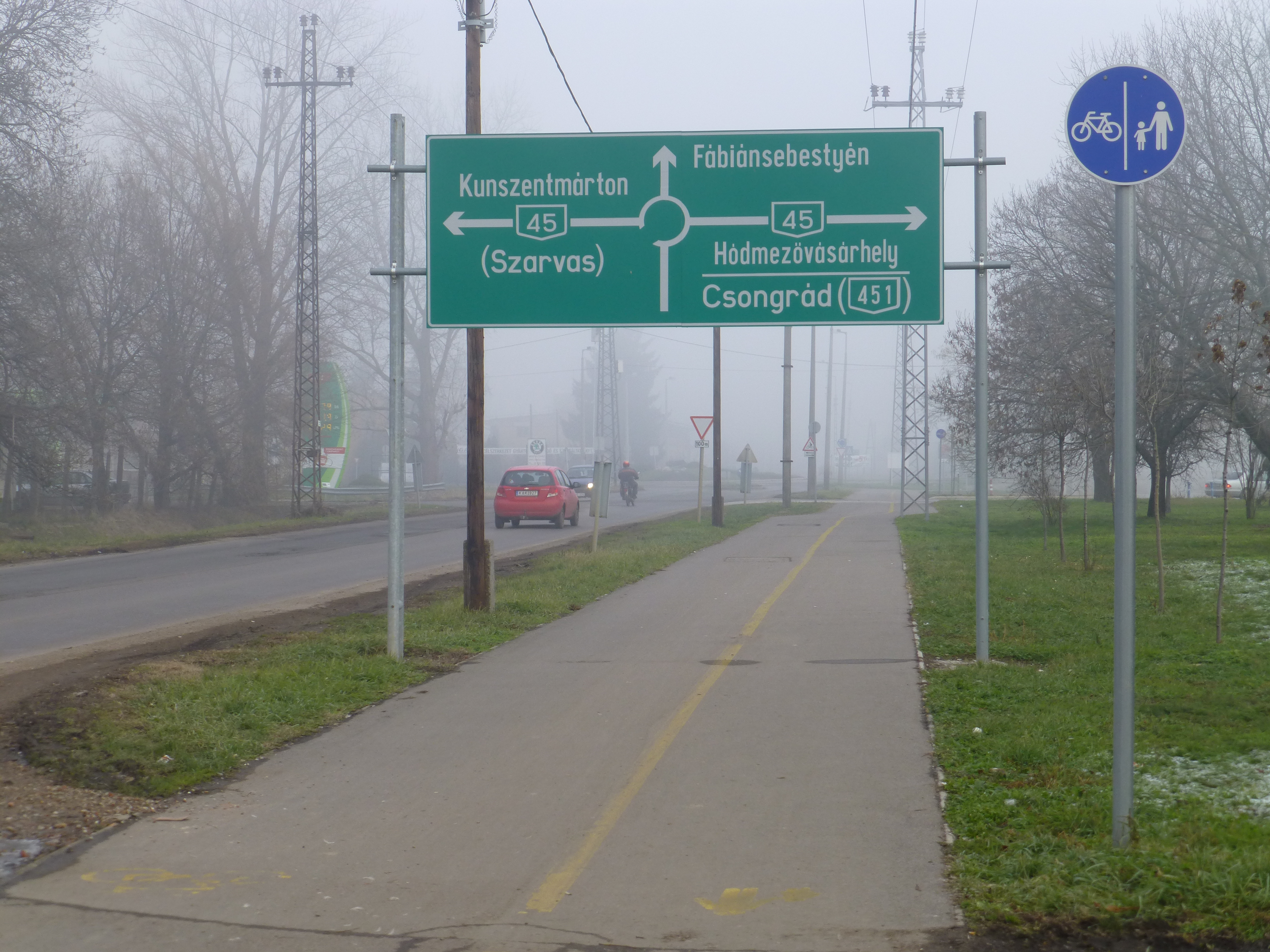
Main road 45 near Szentes.

In 2012, Csongrád-Csanád County had a dense network of public roads, in total length of 1,350 km, of which 281 km were main roads. Inland, connections were provided by 1,049 km of county and communal roads and 20 km were covered with light road surfaces.

Highway network

- runs from Budapest to Röszke (Serbian border). ~ 47 km
- runs from Szombathely to Szeged. (planned)
- runs from Szeged to Csanádpalota (Romanian border). - 58 km

Road network

- runs from Budapest to Röszke (Serbian border), via Kistelek and Szeged. - 52 km
- runs from Szeged to Nagylak (Romanian border), via Makó. - 55 km
- runs from Makó to Hódmezővásárhely. - 30 km
- runs from Makó to Kiszombor (Romanian border). - 6 km
- runs from Kunszentmárton to Hódmezővásárhely, via Szentes. - 43 km
- runs from Szeged to Debrecen, via Hódmezővásárhely.
- runs from Szeged to Bátaszék, via Mórahalom.
- runs from Kiskunfélegyháza to Szentes, via Csongrád.
- western bypass of Szeged.

== Politics ==
=== County Assembly ===
The Csongrád-Csanád County Council, elected at the 2024 local government elections, is made up of 20 counselors, with the following party composition:

Party	Seats	Current County Assembly
Fidesz-KDNP	10	
Our Homeland Movement	5	
Democratic Coalition	2	
Momentum Movement	2	

==== Presidents of the County Assembly ====
President	Terminus
István Lehmann (MSZP)	1990–1998
Dr. József Frank (Fidesz)	1998–2006
Anna Magyar (Fidesz-KDNP)	2006–2014
Béla Kakas (Fidesz-KDNP)	2014–

=== Members of the National Assembly ===
The following members elected of the National Assembly during the 2022 parliamentary election:

Constituency	Member	Party
Csongrád-Csanád County 1st constituency	Sándor Szabó	MSZP
Csongrád-Csanád County 2nd constituency	Béla Mihálffy	Fidesz–KDNP
Csongrád-Csanád County 3rd constituency	Sándor Farkas	Fidesz–KDNP
Csongrád-Csanád County 4th constituency	János Lázár	Fidesz–KDNP

== Municipalities ==
Csongrád-Csanád County has 2 urban counties, 8 towns, 7 large villages and 43 villages.

As a typical Great Plain county, Csongrád-Csanád has a relatively small number of municipalities. 72.5% of the population lives in cities/towns, so it is one of the most urbanized county in Hungary.

Cities with county rights

(ordered by population, as of 2011 census)

- Szeged (168,048) – county seat
- Hódmezővásárhely (46,047)

Towns

- Szentes (28,509)
- Makó (23,683)
- Csongrád (17,242)
- Sándorfalva (7,871)
- Kistelek (7,103)
- Mindszent (6,914)
- Mórahalom (5,804)
- Csanádpalota (2,923)

Villages

- Algyő
- Ambrózfalva
- Apátfalva
- Árpádhalom
- Ásotthalom
- Baks
- Balástya
- Bordány
- Csanádalberti
- Csanytelek
- Csengele
- Derekegyház
- Deszk
- Domaszék
- Dóc
- Eperjes
- Fábiánsebestyén
- Felgyő
- Ferencszállás
- Forráskút
- Földeák
- Királyhegyes
- Kiszombor
- Klárafalva
- Kövegy
- Kübekháza
- Magyarcsanád
- Maroslele
- Mártély
- Nagyér
- Nagylak
- Nagymágocs
- Nagytőke
- Óföldeák
- Ópusztaszer
- Öttömös
- Pitvaros
- Pusztamérges
- Pusztaszer
- Röszke
- Ruzsa
- Szatymaz
- Szegvár
- Székkutas
- Tiszasziget
- Tömörkény
- Újszentiván
- Üllés
- Zákányszék
- Zsombó

municipalities are large villages.

== Gallery ==
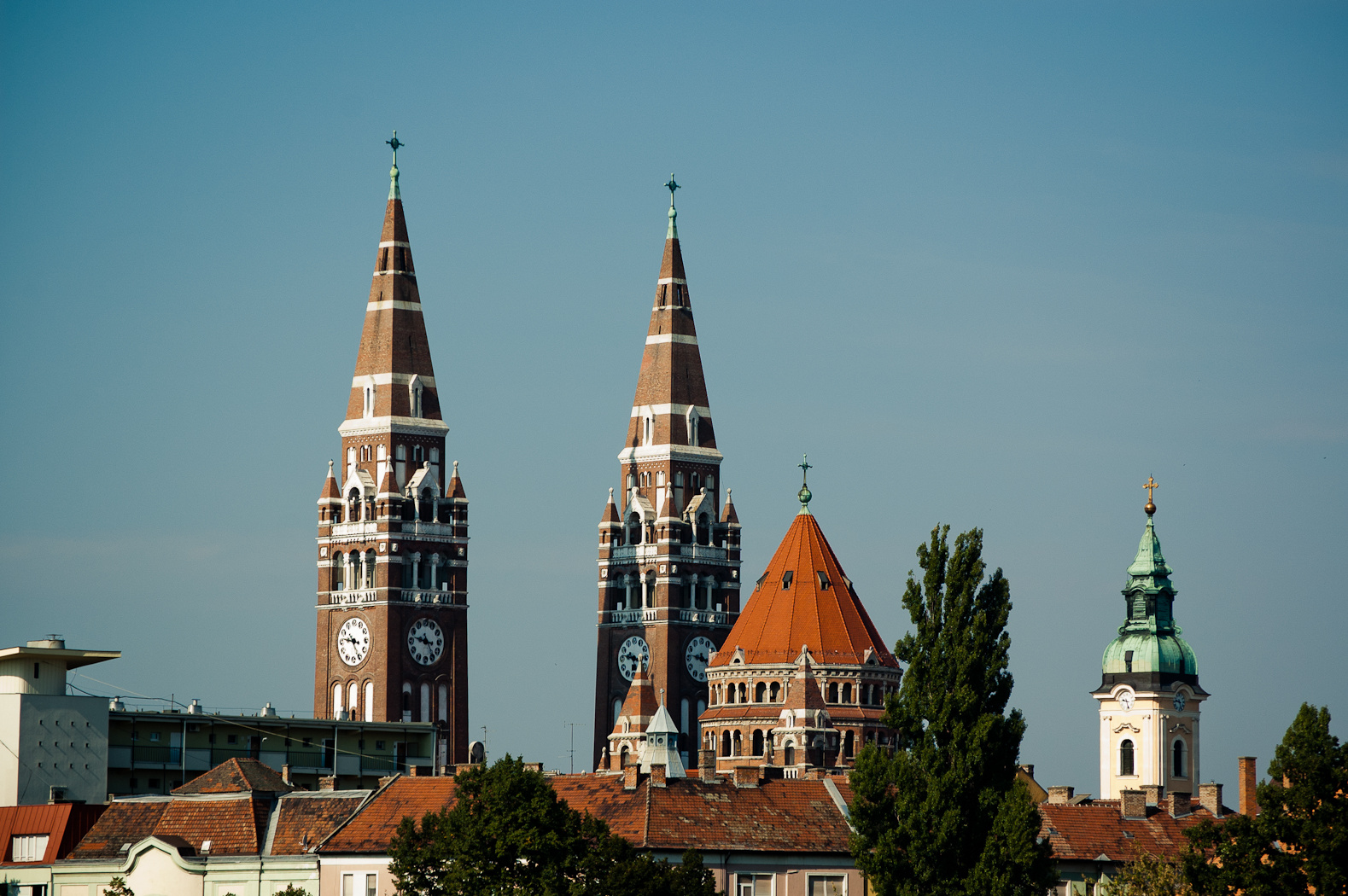
Szeged, the capital of the county

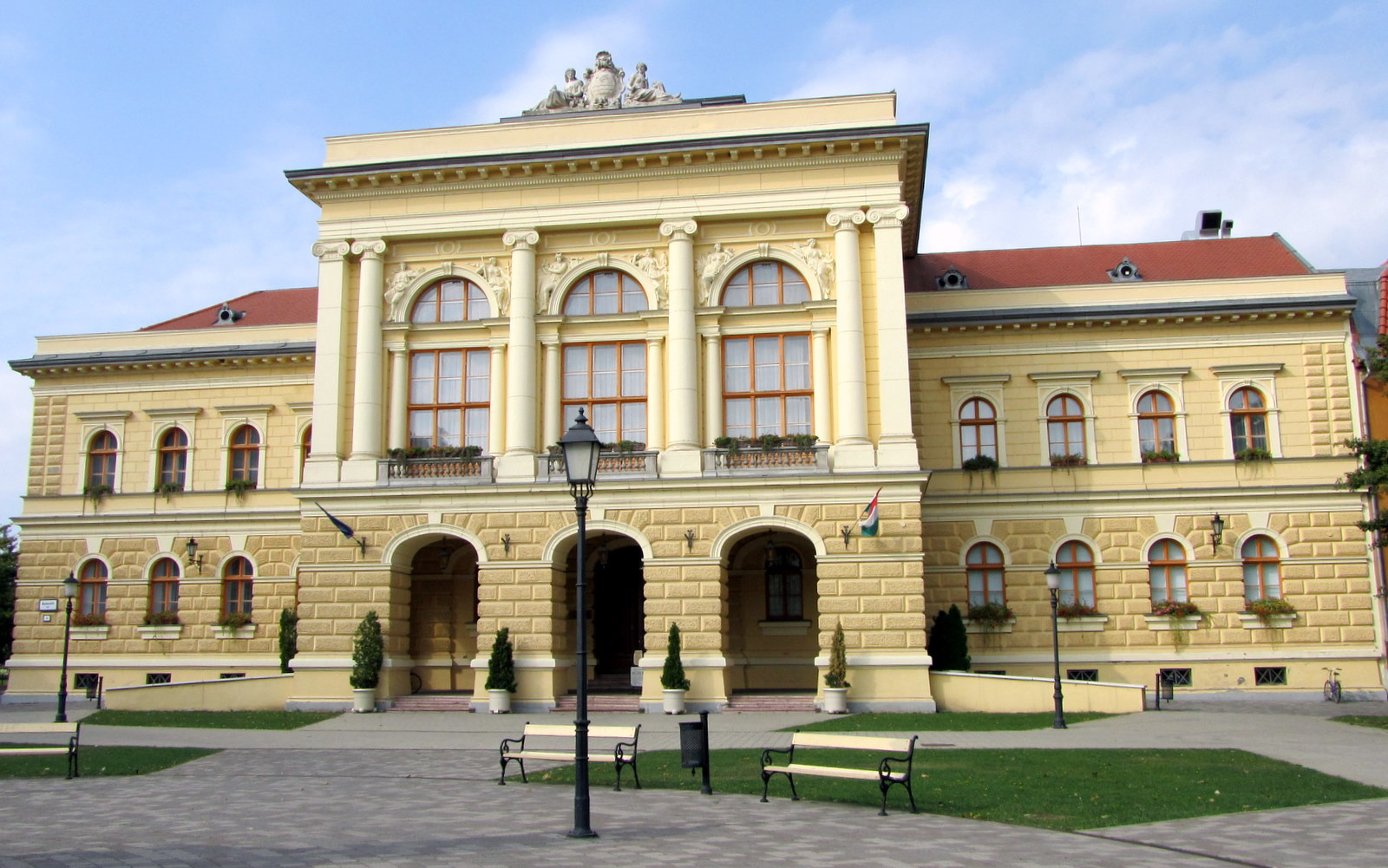
County hall in Szentes

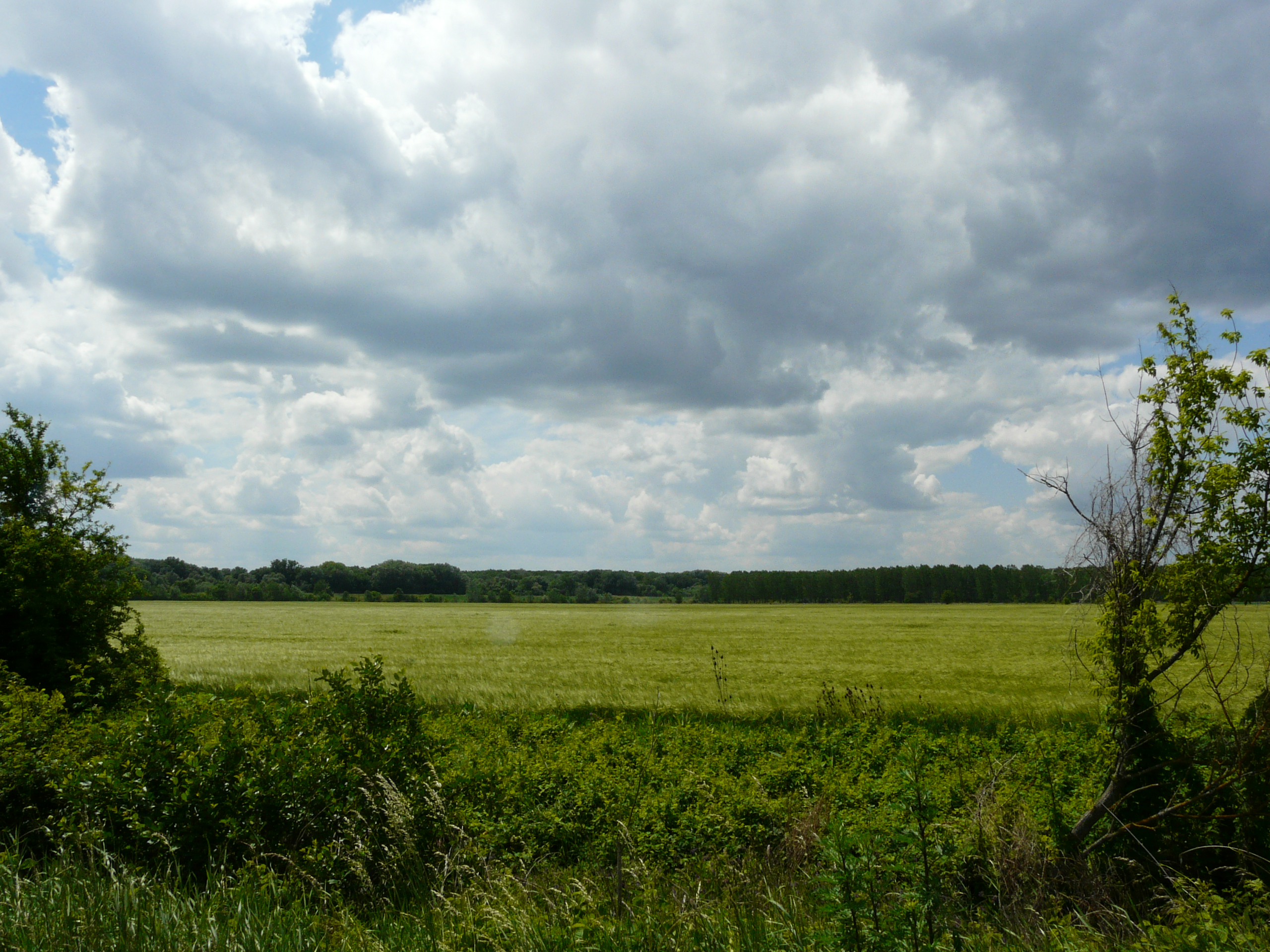
Great Hungarian Plain in Csongrád-Csanád County

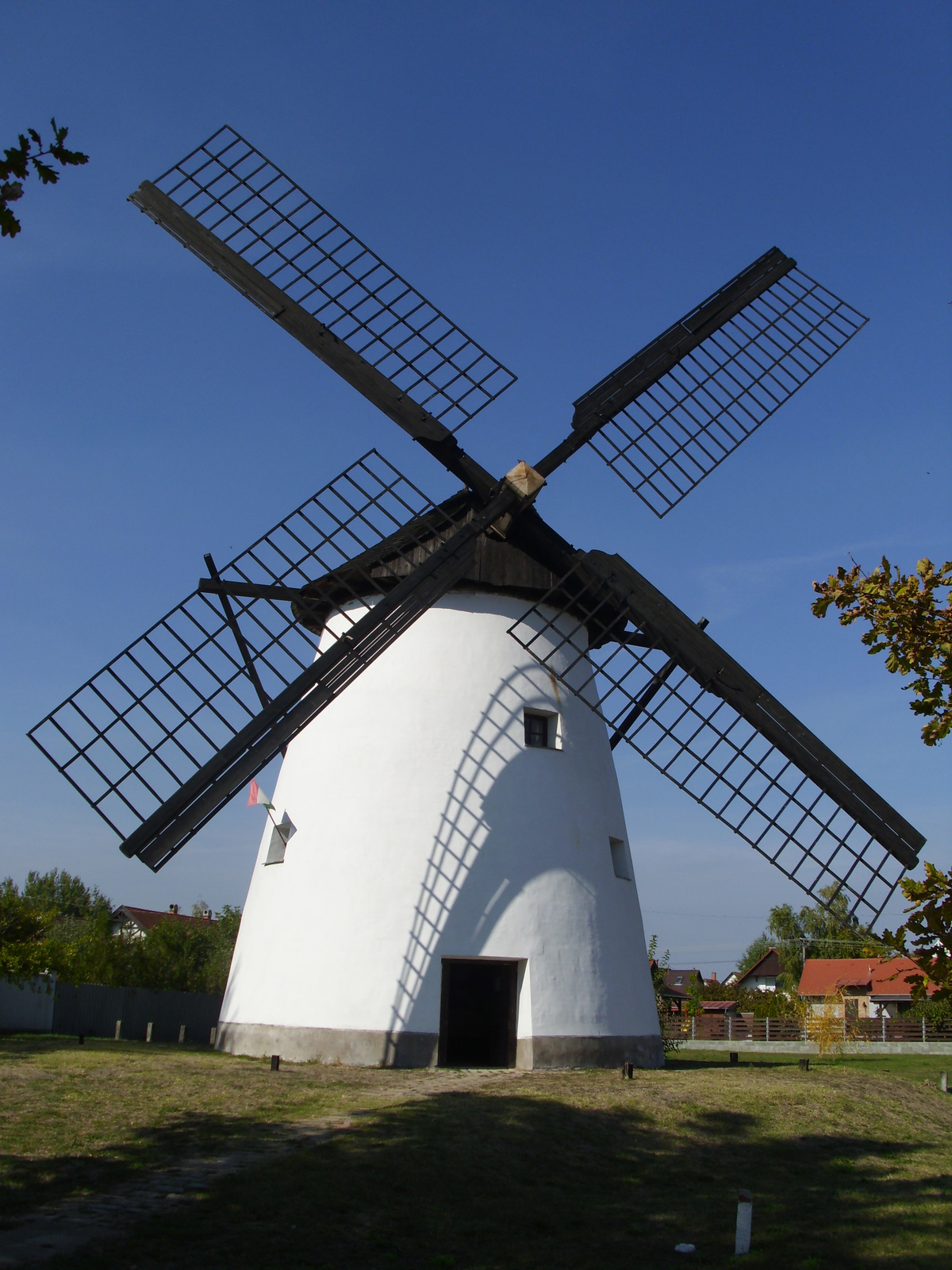
Windmill near Szeged

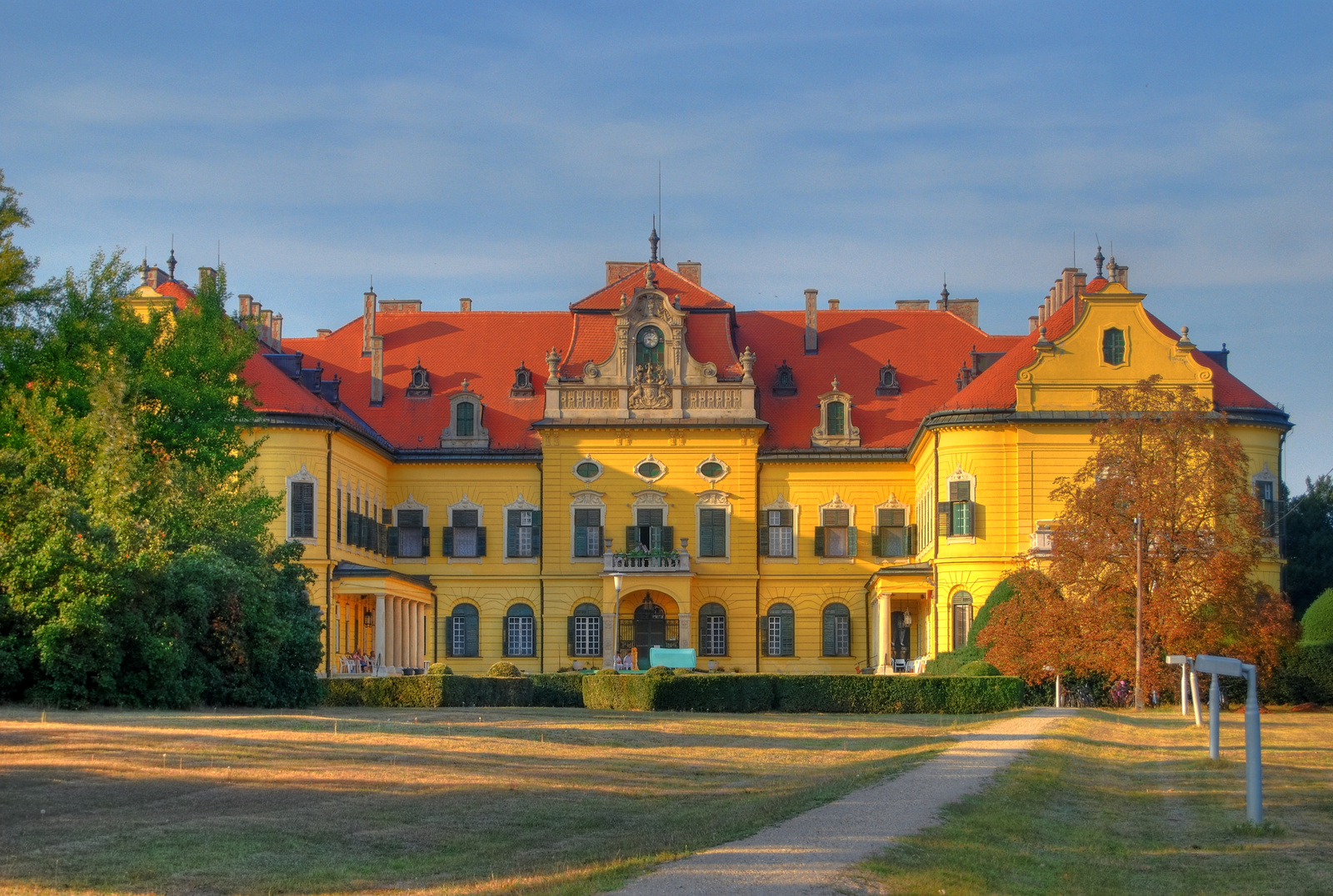
Károlyi Mansion in Nagymágocs

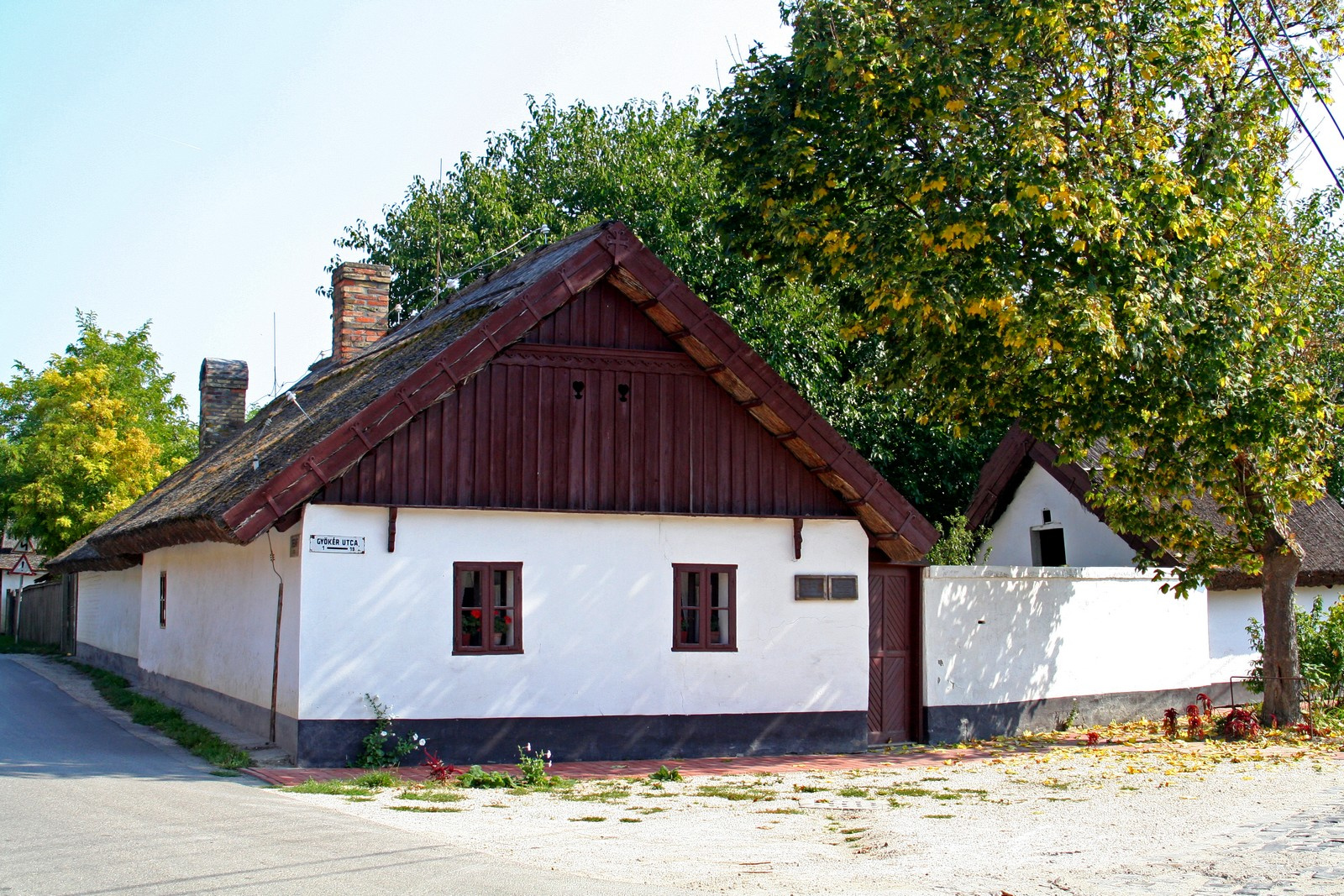
Traditional house in Csongrád

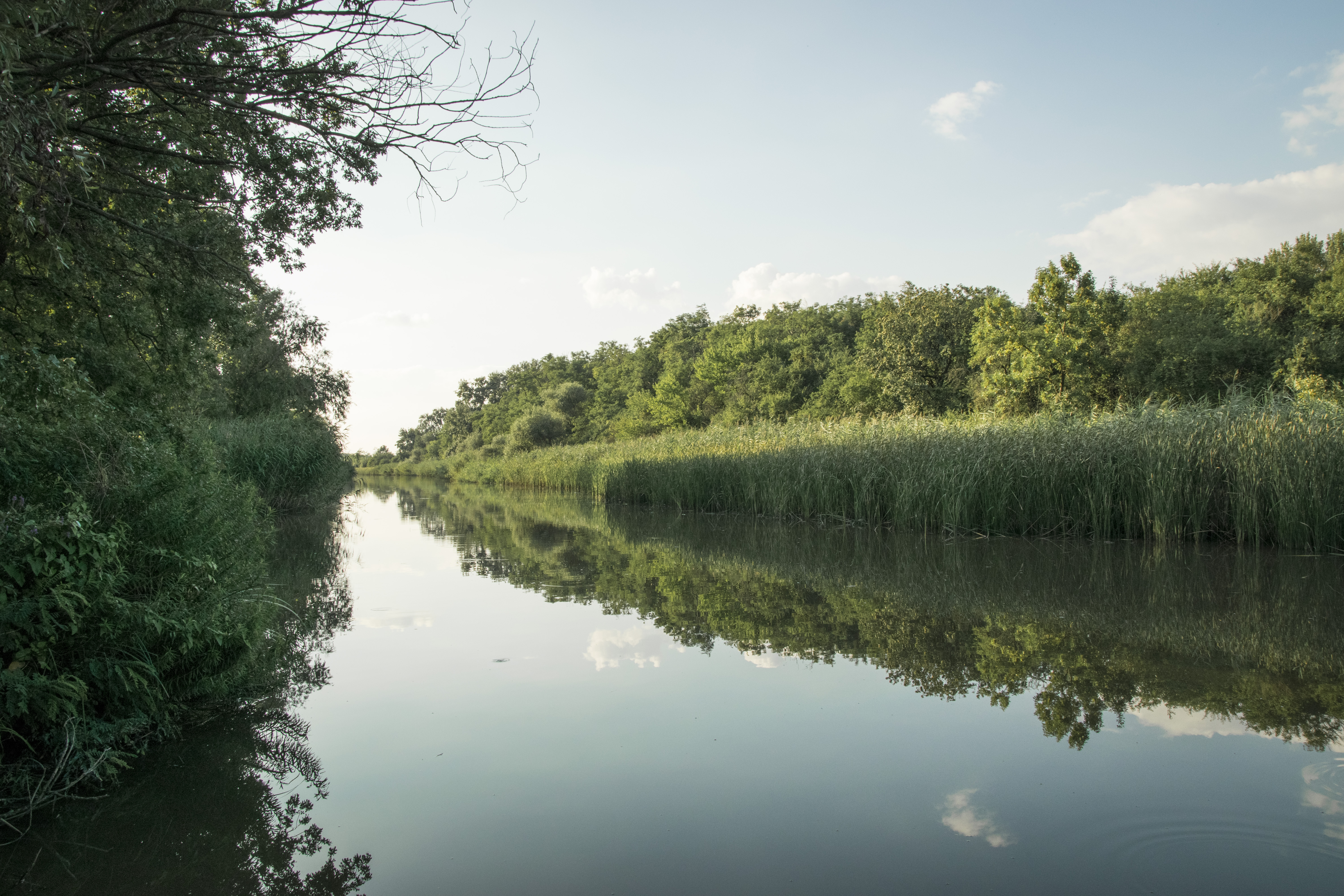
River Kurca

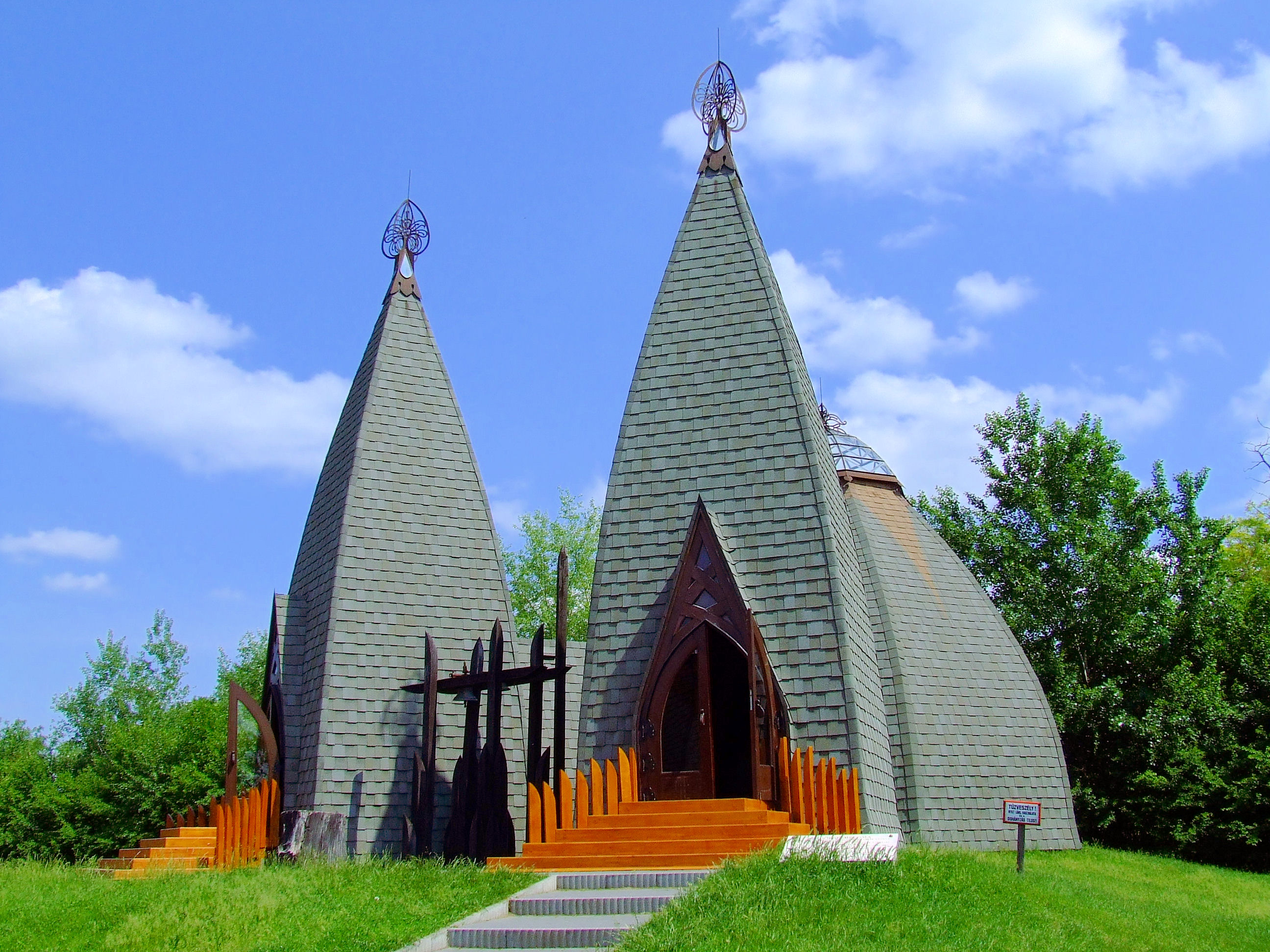
Church of Forests in Ópusztaszer
