= Ambrózfalva =

Coordinates: 46°21′N 20°44′E

- Village
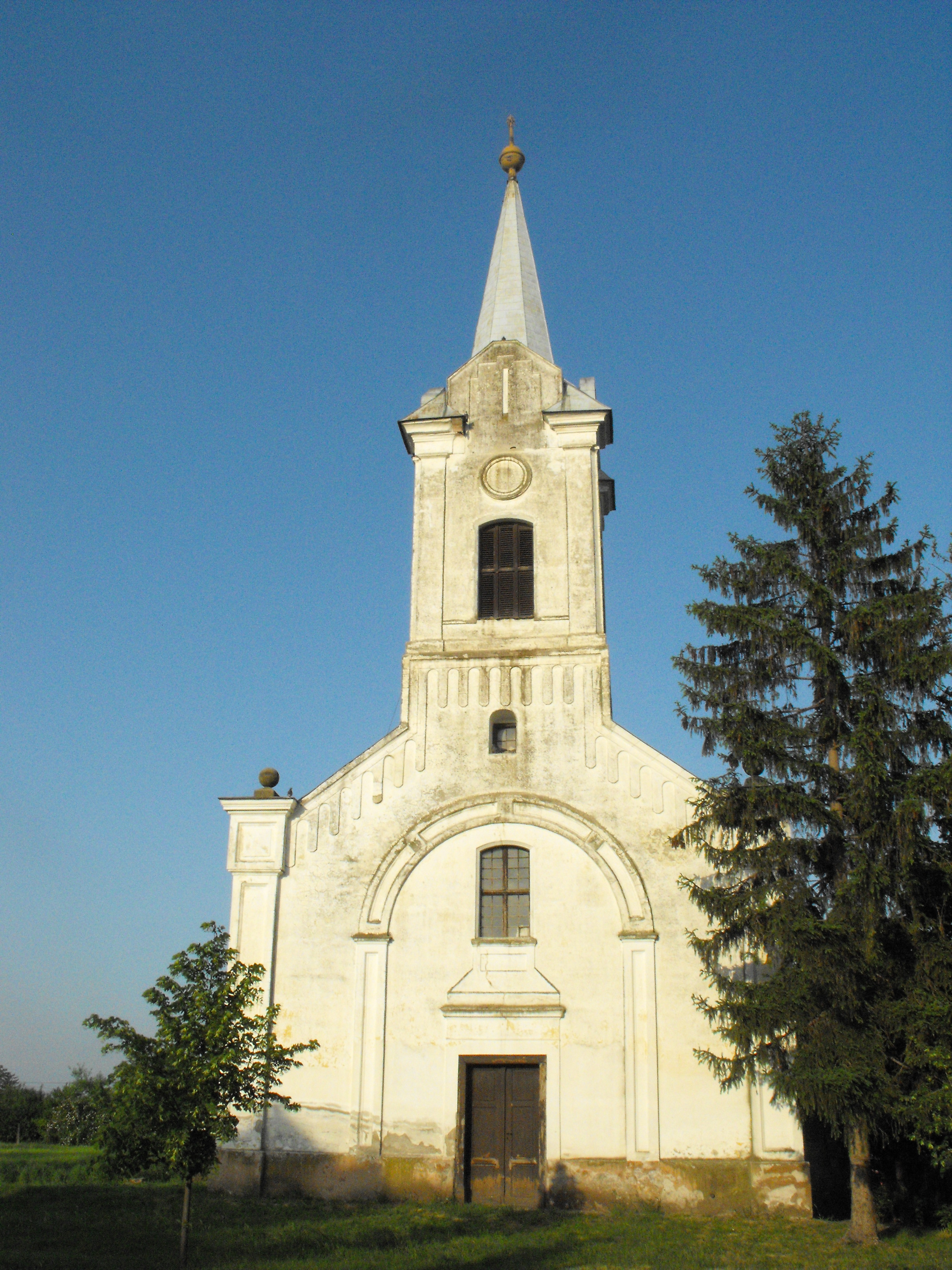

- Coat of arms
- Interactive map of Ambrózfalva
- Country: Hungary
- County: Csongrád

Area
  - Total: 11.22 km^{2} (4.33 sq mi)

Population (2013)
  - Total: 503
  - Density: 44.8/km^{2} (116/sq mi)
- Time zone: UTC+1 (CET)
  - Summer (DST): UTC+2 (CEST)
- Postal code: 6916
- Area code: 62

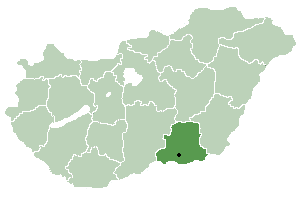
Location of Csongrád County in Hungary

Ambrózfalva (Slovak: Ambrózka) is a village in Csongrád County, in the Southern Great Plain region of southern Hungary.

== Geography ==
It covers an area of 11.22 km^{2} (4 sq mi) and has a population of 503 people (2013 estimate).

== History ==
In 1843, 120 Slovakian tobacco cultivating families settled here from nearby Békéscsaba. At this time, the village was considered an extension of Pitvaros, but today derives its name from the baron Lajos Ambrózy. In 1845 the Reformed Church built a school, church, and minister's house in the village. By 1891 the vast majority of the village's 1006 inhabitants were Slovak, and they began to engage in hemp cultivation. Two years later, a railroad was completed, and the village shared a railway station with the neighbouring Nagyér. In 1907, the Hungarian government opened a public school and daycare centre in the village.

The ethnic composition of the village changed fundamentally in 1946. The Slovaks who comprised the vast majority of the population were resettled to Slovakia, and were replaced with Hungarians who were being deported from Slovakia as a part of the Czechoslovak–Hungarian population exchange program.

== Coat of arms ==
The coat of arms of Ambrózfalva has two images: three ears of corn on the left side, and a patriarchal cross on the right. The three ears of corn act as a reference to the agricultural characteristics of the village and the area. The golden ears of corn symbolize the ancestors' settling in and also represents their success. The patriarchal cross is similar to that of the coat of arms of Slovakia and is a reminder of the Slovak origin of the population of the area. It also represents the importance of recognizing national and ethnic traditions.

== Population ==
Year	1980	1990	2001	2010	2011	2013
Population	581 (census)	555 (census)	525 (census)	498 (estimate)	496 (census)	503 (estimate)

=== Demographics ===
The population of Ambrózfalva declared themselves 86% Hungarian, 13% Slovak, and 1% Romanian in a 2001 census.
