= Csongrád District =

Coordinates: 46.7167°N 20.1333°E

Csongrád District Csongrádi járás
- Districts of Hungary
- Coat of arms

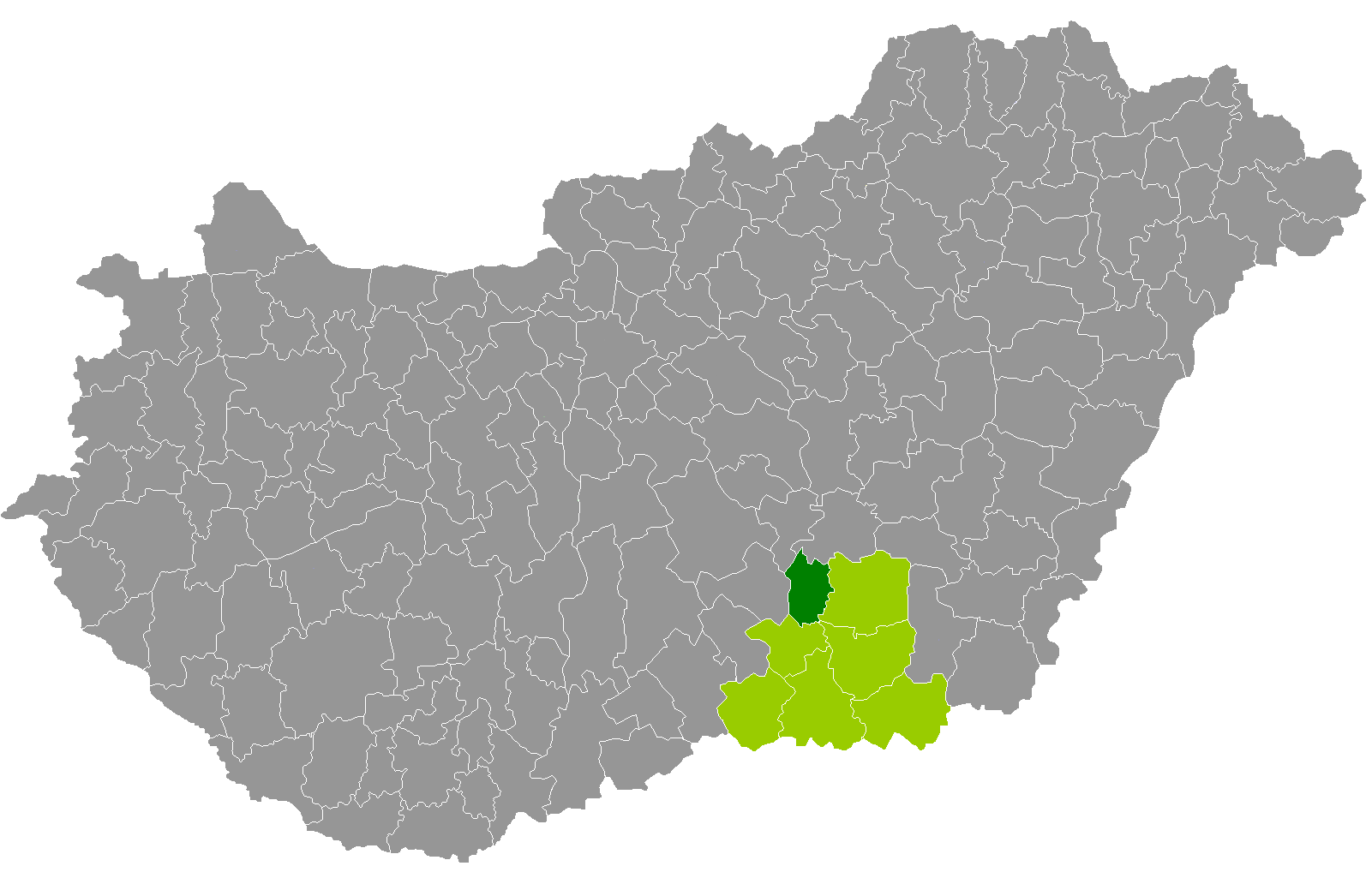
- Csongrád District within Hungary and Csongrád County.
- Country: Hungary
- County: Csongrád
- District seat: Csongrád (town)

Area
  - Total: 339.24 km^{2} (130.98 sq mi)
  - Rank: 7th in Csongrád

Population (2011 census)
  - Total: 22,996
  - Rank: 6th in Csongrád
  - Density: 68/km^{2} (180/sq mi)

Csongrád (Hungarian: Csongrádi járás) is a district in north-western part of Csongrád County. Csongrád is also the name of the town where the district seat is found. The district is located in the Southern Great Plain Statistical Region.

== Geography ==
Csongrád District borders with Kunszentmárton District (Jász-Nagykun-Szolnok County) to the northeast, Szentes District to the east, Kistelek District to the south, Kiskunfélegyháza District and Tiszakécske District (Bács-Kiskun County) to the west. The number of the inhabited places in Csongrád District is 4.

== Municipalities ==
The district has 1 town and 3 villages. (ordered by population, as of 1 January 2012)

- Csanytelek (2,755)
- **Csongrád** (16,846) – district seat
- Felgyő (1,281)
- Tömörkény (1,751)

The bolded municipality is the city.

== Demographics ==
Religion in Csongrád District (2011 census)
1. Catholic Church (58.2%)
2. Greek Catholicism (0.10%)
3. Calvinism (2.70%)
4. Lutheranism (0.30%)
5. Other religions (1.10%)
6. Non-religious (13.7%)
7. Atheists (0.80%)
8. Undeclared (23.1%)

In 2011, it had a population of 22,996 and the population density was 68/km².

Year	County population	Change
2011	22,996	n/a

=== Ethnicity ===
Besides the Hungarian majority, the main minority is the Roma (approx. 300).

Total population (2011 census): 22,996
Ethnic groups (2011 census): Identified themselves: 20,969 persons:

- Hungarians: 20,366 (97.12%)
- Gypsies: 305 (1.45%)
- Others and indefinable: 298 (1.42%)

Approx. 2,000 persons in Csongrád District did not declare their ethnic group at the 2011 census.

=== Religion ===
Religious adherence in the county according to 2011 census:

- Catholic – 13,412 (Roman Catholic – 13,380; Greek Catholic – 31);
- Reformed – 621;
- Evangelical – 63;
- other religions – 245;
- Non-religious – 3,165;
- Atheism – 179;
- Undeclared – 5,311.

== Gallery ==
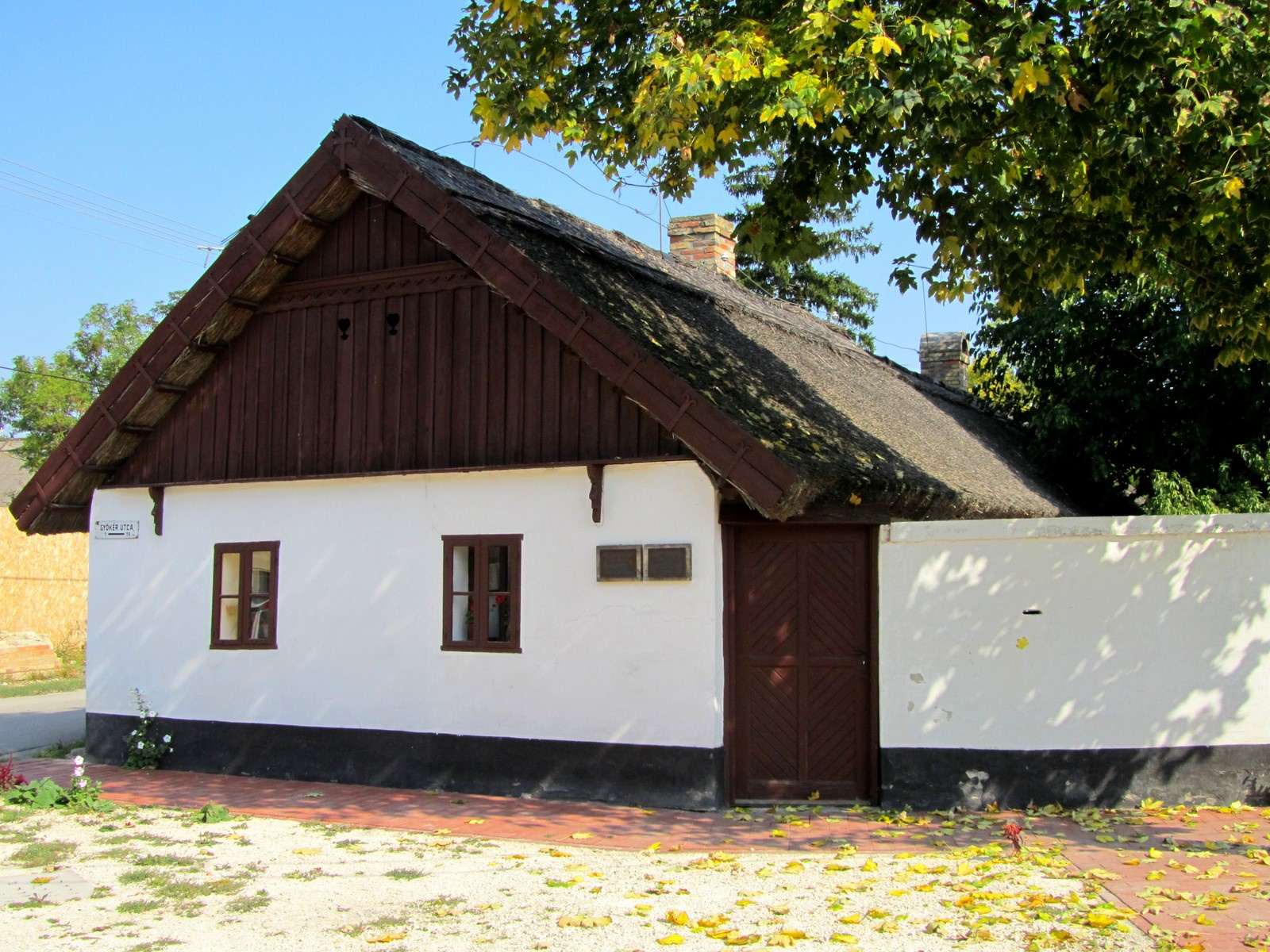
Csongrád, the district seat

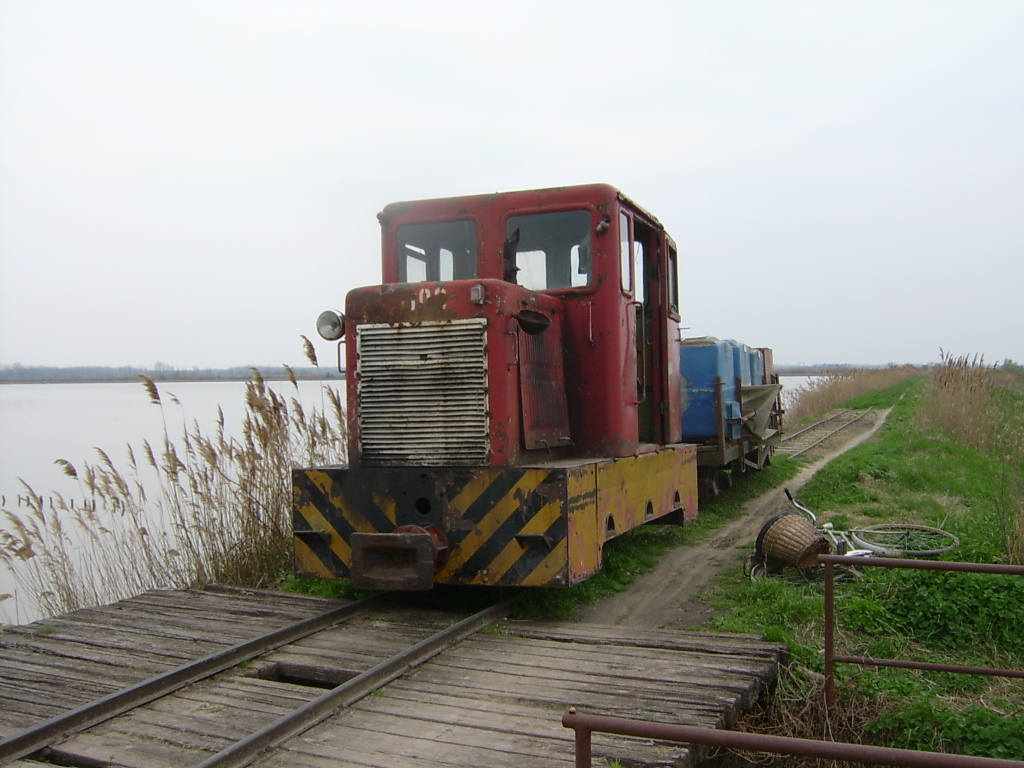
Narrow gauge rail near Tömörkény

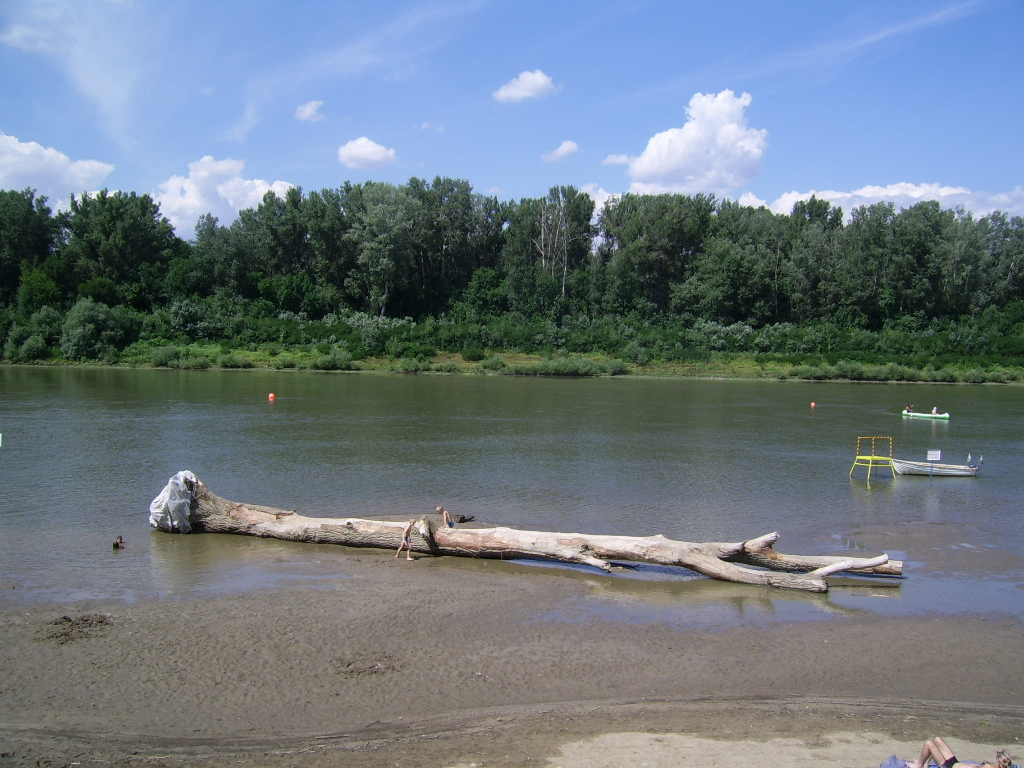
Sandbank near Csongrád (Tisza river)

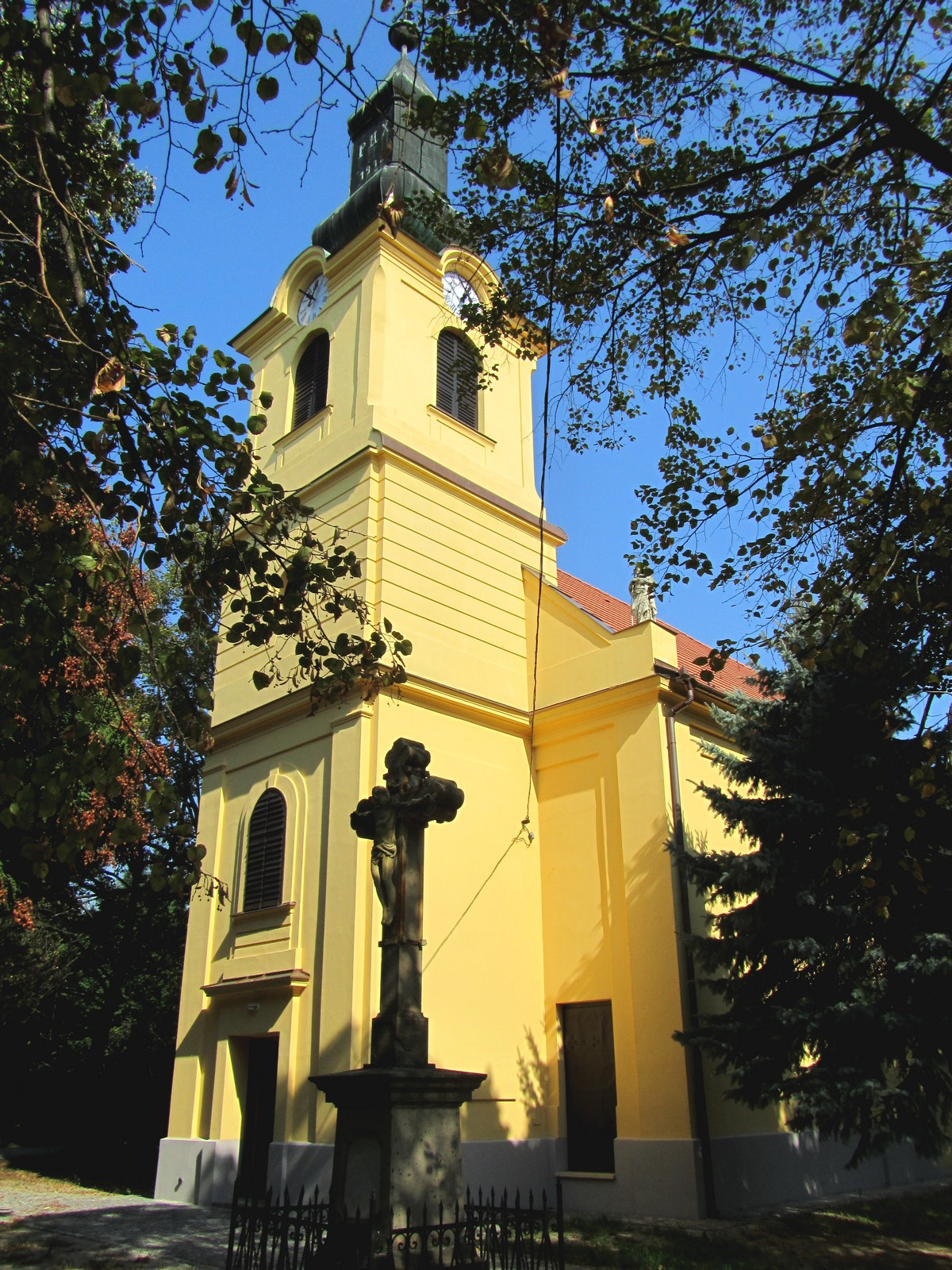
St. Roch Church in Csongrád

== See also ==
- List of cities and towns of Hungary
