= Újszentiván =

Coordinates: 46°11′N 20°11′E

- Village
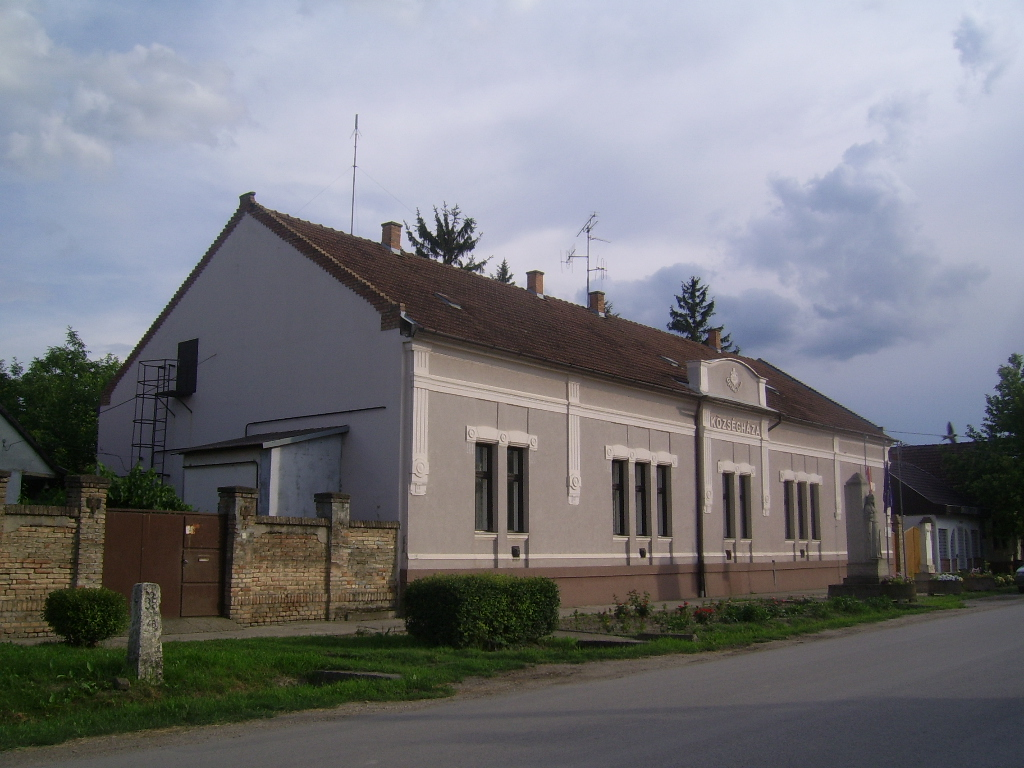
- Újszentiván community hall

- Coat of arms
- Interactive map of Újszentiván
- Country: Hungary
- County: Csongrád

Area
  - Total: 15.49 km^{2} (5.98 sq mi)

Population (2002)
  - Total: 1,578
  - Density: 102/km^{2} (260/sq mi)
- Time zone: UTC+1 (CET)
  - Summer (DST): UTC+2 (CEST)
- Postal code: 6754
- Area code: 62

Újszentiván (Serbian: Нови Сентиван, romanized: Novi Sentivan) is a village in Csongrád county, in the Southern Great Plain region of southern Hungary. Its residents are majority Hungarians, with a minority of Serbs.

== Geography ==
It covers an area of 15.49 km^{2} (6 sq mi) and has a population of 1578 people (2002). It lies 10km south-southwest of downtown Szeged.

== History ==
The village was first mentioned in writing in 1411 under the name "Zenth Iwan" meaning "Saint Stephen", a name the village derived from its church. From its beginnings, the town was ruled by minor nobility, and populated by Hungarian serfs. Due to the battles that raged during the expulsion of Turks from Hungary following the Ottoman defeat at the Siege of Buda in 1686, the town's population was wiped out.

The town was repopulated in 1783 when groups of Serbs from Tiszasziget settled in. In the early 19th century, wealthy Germans of Frankish descent moved in from the now-extinct town of Csanád. These Germans no longer remain, following the mass expulsion of Germans in 1946.

Following the First World War the village briefly fell under the jurisdiction of the State of Slovenes, Croats and Serbs, along with the surrounding area. During the interwar period, 250 Serbs migrated into Yugoslavia, and were replaced by Hungarians.

On the afternoon of October 9th, 1944, the Red Army entered the village. The night before, German forces left the village after they destroyed the Szeged-Timisoara railway line. In 1946 the village's German population was deported.

== Demographics ==
As of 2022, 92.4% of the village was Hungarian, 3.1% Serbian, 1.3% Gypsy, 0.4% Romanian, 0.4% German, and 4.3% of non-European origin.
