= Klárafalva =

Coordinates: 46°13′N 20°20′E

- Village
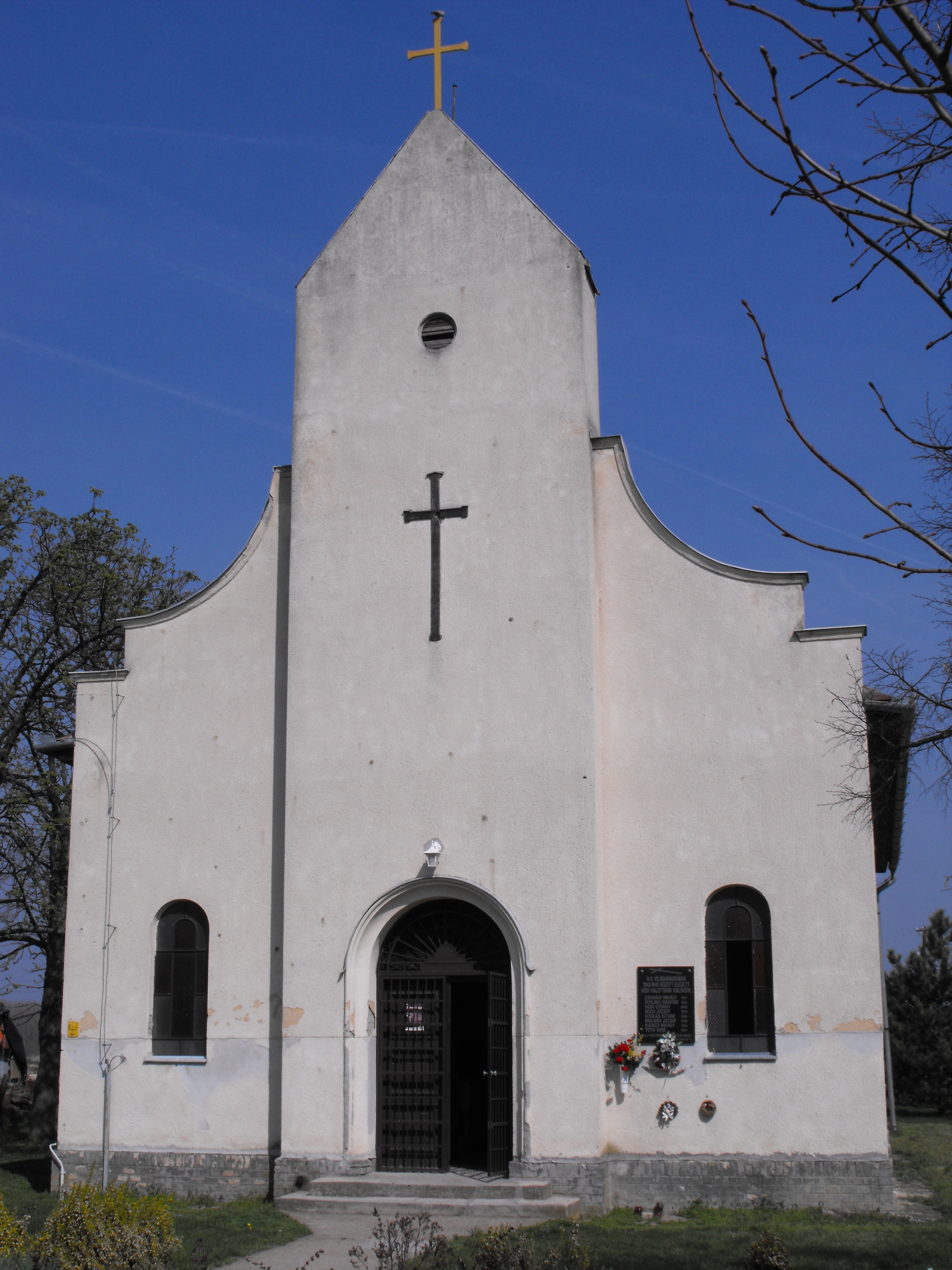
- Roman Catholic Church in Klárafalva

- Coat of arms
- Interactive map of Klárafalva
- Country: Hungary
- County: Csongrád

Area
  - Total: 9.10 km^{2} (3.51 sq mi)

Population (2015)
  - Total: 462
  - Density: 50.8/km^{2} (132/sq mi)
- Time zone: UTC+1 (CET)
  - Summer (DST): UTC+2 (CEST)
- Postal code: 6773
- Area code: 62

Klárafalva is a village in Csongrád county, in the Southern Great Plain region of southern Hungary.

== Geography ==
It covers an area of 9.1 km^{2} (4 sq mi) and has a population of 462 people (2015).

== History ==
The area around Klárafalva had been inhabited since the migration period, and was a preferred spot for large animal herders. Archaeological remains suggest the presence of Avars in the region as well.
