= Üllés =

Coordinates: 46°20′N 19°51′E

- Village
- Coat of arms
- Interactive map of Üllés
- Country: Hungary
- County: Csongrád

Area
  - Total: 49.88 km^{2} (19.26 sq mi)

Population (2002)
  - Total: 3,206
  - Density: 64/km^{2} (170/sq mi)
- Time zone: UTC+1 (CET)
  - Summer (DST): UTC+2 (CEST)
- Postal code: 6794
- Area code: 62

Üllés is a village in Csongrád county, in the Southern Great Plain region of southern Hungary. There is a gas field near the village.

== Geography ==
It covers an area of 49.88 km^{2} (19 sq mi) and has a population of 3206 people (2002).

== History ==
Üllés and its surroundings have been inhabited since the Migration Period. During the Middle Ages the site of the village was a Cuman plain, and the area was not repopulated until 1745, when homesteads were built on the plain. These homesteads continued into the late 1800s, and mostly engaged in swine herding.

In 2011, a patriarchal cross was erected in the village's central park by the Jobbik political party.
