= Apátfalva =

Coordinates: 46°10′N 20°35′E

- Village
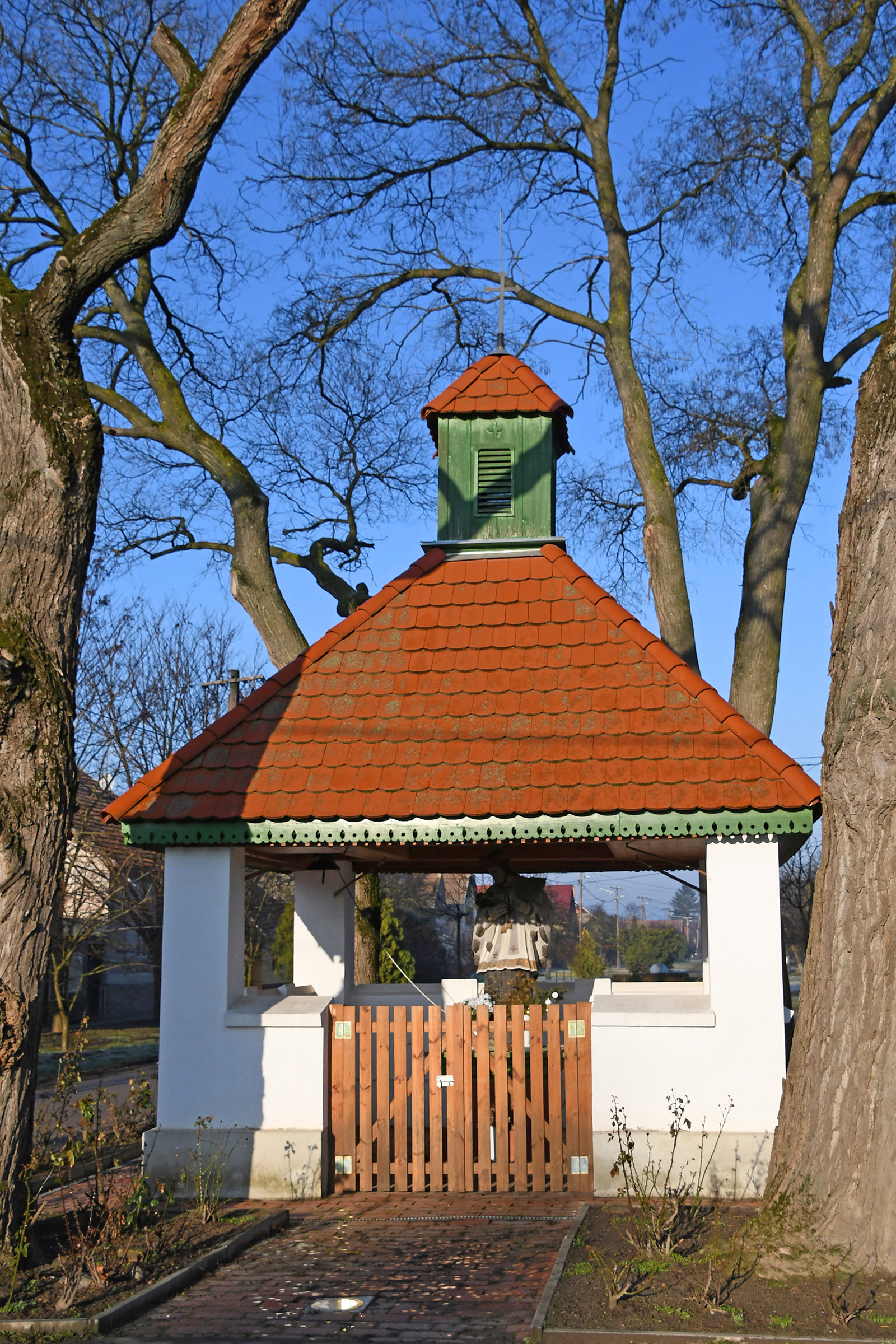
- Statue of John the Apostle in Apátfalva

- Coat of arms
- Interactive map of Apátfalva
- Country: Hungary
- County: Csongrád

Area
  - Total: 53.77 km^{2} (20.76 sq mi)

Population (2015)
  - Total: 2,920
  - Density: 54.3/km^{2} (141/sq mi)
- Time zone: UTC+1 (CET)
  - Summer (DST): UTC+2 (CEST)
- Postal code: 6931
- Area code: 62

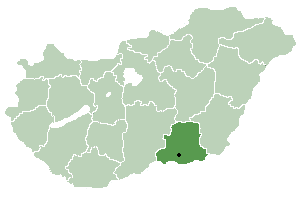
Location of Csongrád County in Hungary

Apátfalva is a village in Csongrád County, in the Southern Great Plain region of southern Hungary.

== Geography ==
It covers an area of 53.77 km^{2} (21 sq mi) and has a population of 2290 people (2015).

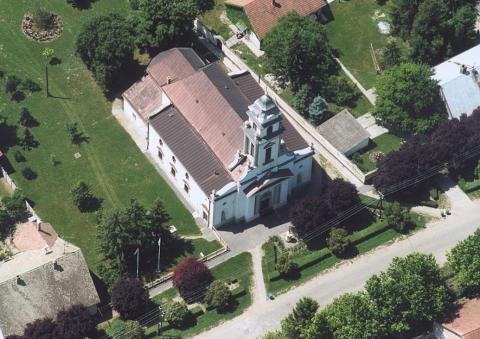
Saint Michael's church, Apátfalva
