= Anna Magyar =

Hungarian politician

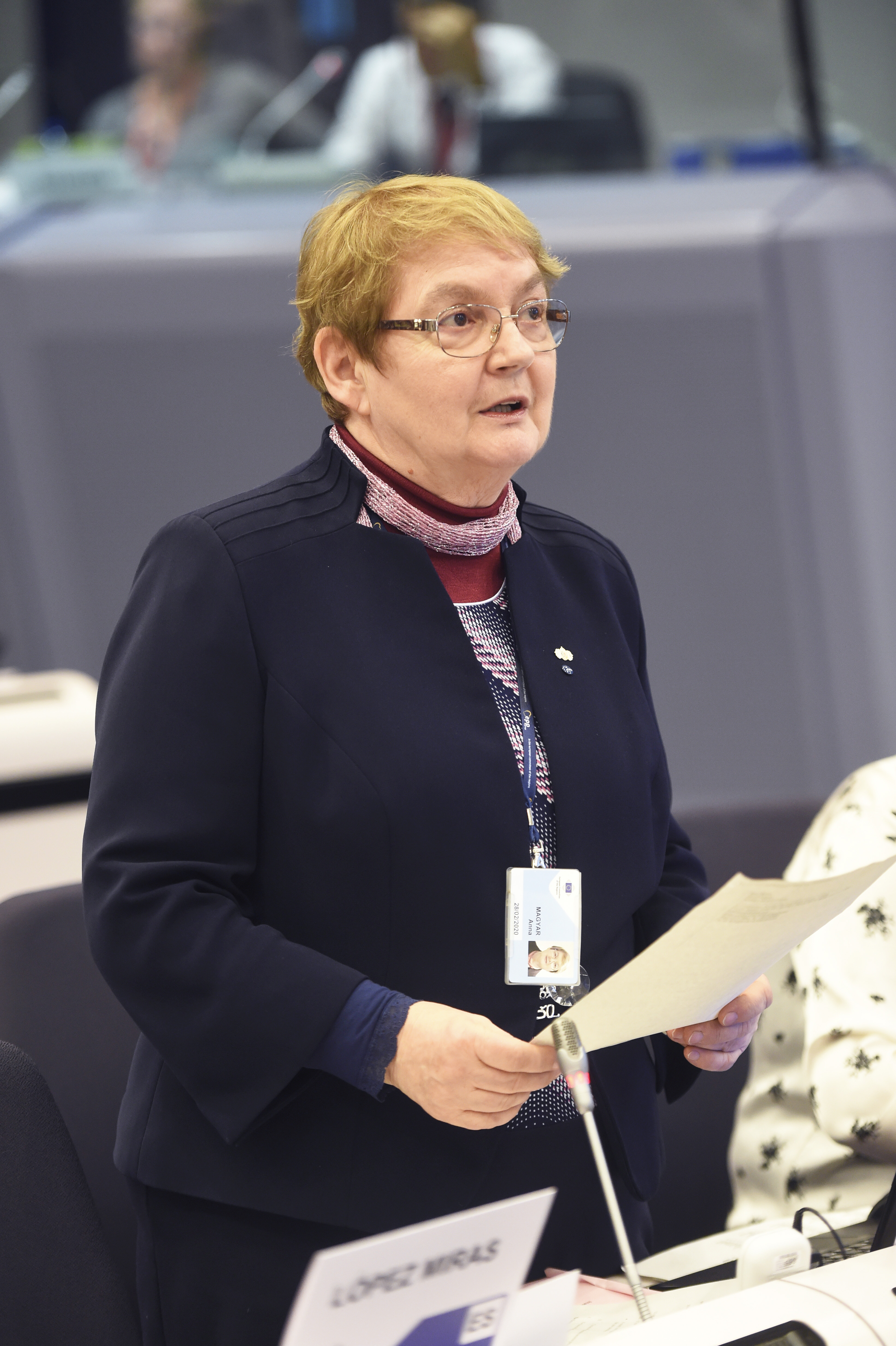

Member of the National Assembly
- In office 14 May 2010 – 5 May 2014

Personal details
- Born: Szolnok, Hungary
- Party: Fidesz
- Spouse: dr Tibor Asztalos
- Children: 2
- Profession: politician

Anna Magyar is a Hungarian politician, member of the National Assembly (MP) from Fidesz Csongrád County Regional List from 2010 to 2014. She was a member of the Committee on Audit Office and Budget from May 14, 2010, to May 5, 2014.

She was president of the General Assembly of Csongrád County between 2006 and 2014, the first woman to hold that office.

== Personal life ==
She is married to Dr Tibor Asztalos. They have two children.
