= Bordány =

Hungarian village in Csongrád County, Southern Great Plain

Coordinates: 46°19′N 19°55′E

- Village
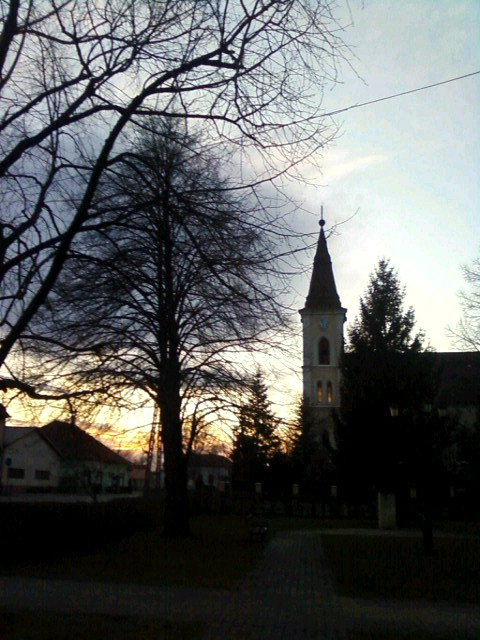
- Church in Bordány

- Coat of arms
- Interactive map of Bordány
- Country: Hungary
- County: Csongrád

Area
  - Total: 36.48 km^{2} (14.09 sq mi)

Population (2013)
  - Total: 3,258
  - Density: 89.3/km^{2} (231/sq mi)
- Time zone: UTC+1 (CET)
  - Summer (DST): UTC+2 (CEST)
- Postal code: 6795
- Area code: 62

Bordány is a village in Csongrád County, in the Southern Great Plain region of southern Hungary.

== Geography ==
It covers an area of 36.48 km^{2} (14 sq mi) and has a population of 3,258 people (2013 estimate).

== History ==
In Roman times, Bordány was inhabited by Sarmatians who inhabited much of the region between Szeged and the Danube, and conducted lucrative business with the inhabitants of Pannonia. Following the collapse of the Roman Empire, the village's inhabitants were replaced by Gepids, who left behind distinctive ostraca and grave markers.

Following the Hungarian conquest of the Carpathian Basin, Hungarians settled the village but were soon wiped out during the First Mongol invasion of Hungary. Then, in the 1240s, the Mongols settled Cumans into the village.

The village's name first appeared in writing as "Bordán" in a 1543 urbarium. The roots of the name "Bordán" are unknown, but may be related to the south-slavic "prudan" meaning "useful" or "welcoming".

In 1702, after the Ottomans were chased out of Hungary, the village and its land were purchased by the Teutonic Order. The regional administrator Orczy István was tasked with repopulating the war-torn region, and in 1718 he brought families in from the surrounding Kunság. In the summer of 1719, Jász and Palóc families from across Hungary were settled in as well. In 1745, serfdom was abolished in the region, and the villagers came to own the land they worked and lived upon.

The first school in Bordány was opened in 1894, and in 1898 a doctor's office was constructed.

== Population ==
Year	1980	1990	2001	2010	2011	2013
Population	2,766 (census)	2,825 (census)	3,145 (census)	3,230 (estimate)	3,230 (census)	3,258 (estimate)
