= Csanádalberti =

Coordinates: 46°20′N 20°43′E

- Village
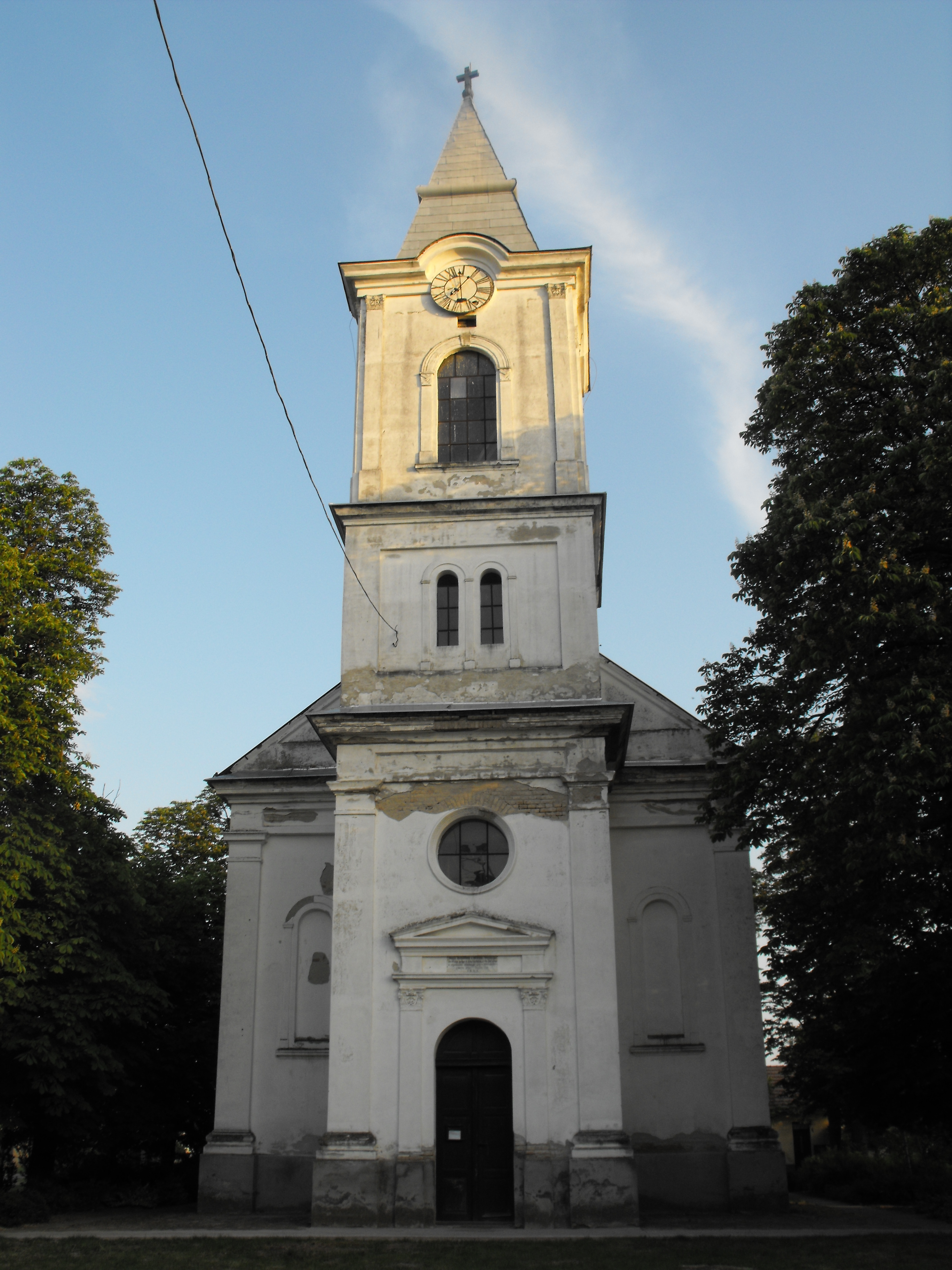
- Lutheran church in Csanádalberti

- Coat of arms
- Interactive map of Csanádalberti
- Country: Hungary
- County: Csongrád

Area
  - Total: 15.32 km^{2} (5.92 sq mi)

Population (2013)
  - Total: 439
  - Density: 28.7/km^{2} (74/sq mi)
- Time zone: UTC+1 (CET)
  - Summer (DST): UTC+2 (CEST)
- Postal code: 6915
- Area code: 62

Csanádalberti is a village in Csongrád County, in the Southern Great Plain region of southern Hungary.

== Geography ==
It covers an area of 15.32 km^{2} (6 sq mi) and has a population of 439 people (2013 estimate).

== Population ==
| Year | 1980 | 1990 | 2001 | 2010 | 2011 | 2013 |
| Population | 606 (census) | 528 (census) | 475 (census) | 455 (estimate) | 447 (census) | 439 (estimate) |
