= Forráskút =

Coordinates: 46°22′N 19°55′E

- Village
- Coat of arms
- Interactive map of Forráskút
- Country: Hungary
- County: Csongrád

Area
  - Total: 36.67 km^{2} (14.16 sq mi)

Population (2015)
  - Total: 2,265
  - Density: 36.6/km^{2} (95/sq mi)
- Time zone: UTC+1 (CET)
  - Summer (DST): UTC+2 (CEST)
- Postal code: 6793
- Area code: 62

Forráskút is a village in Csongrád county, in the Southern Great Plain region of southern Hungary.

== Geography ==
It covers an area of 36.67 km^{2} (14 sq mi) and has a population of 2265 people (2015).

== Demographics ==
As of 2022, 93.7% of the population was Hungarian, 2% Romanian, 0.3% German, 0.2% Gypsy, and 1.6% of non-European origin.
