= Fábiánsebestyén =

Coordinates: 46°41′N 20°28′E

- Village
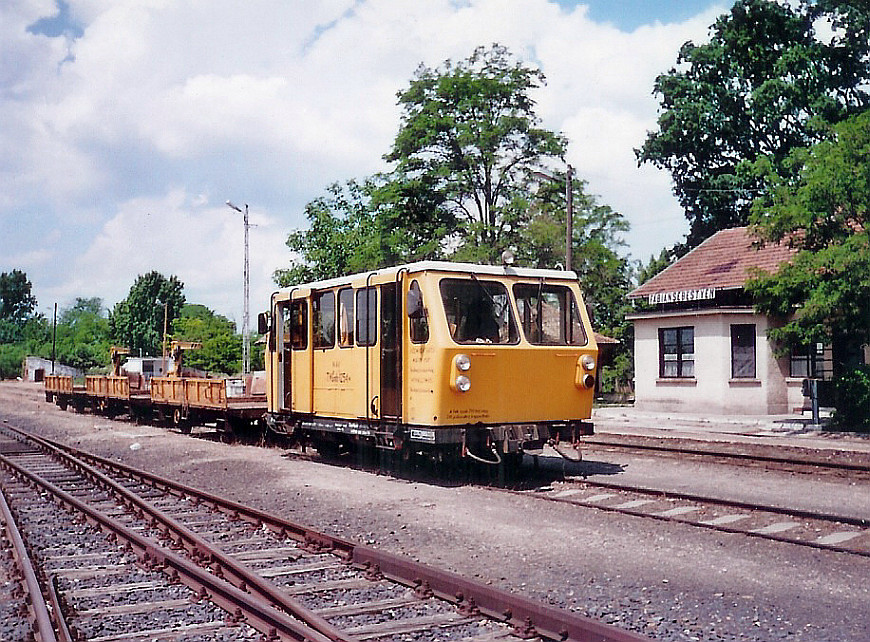
- Fábiánsebestyén train station

- Coat of arms
- Interactive map of Fábiánsebestyén
- Country: Hungary
- County: Csongrád

Area
  - Total: 71.72 km^{2} (27.69 sq mi)

Population (2015)
  - Total: 1,970
  - Density: 27.5/km^{2} (71/sq mi)
- Time zone: UTC+1 (CET)
  - Summer (DST): UTC+2 (CEST)
- Postal code: 6625
- Area code: 63

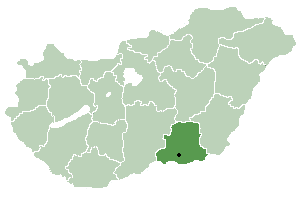
Location of Csongrád County in Hungary

Fábiánsebestyén is a village in Csongrád county, in the Southern Great Plain region of southern Hungary.

== Geography ==
It covers an area of 71.72 km^{2} (28 sq mi) and has a population of 1970 people (2015).
