= Zsombó =

Coordinates: 46°20′N 19°59′E

- Village
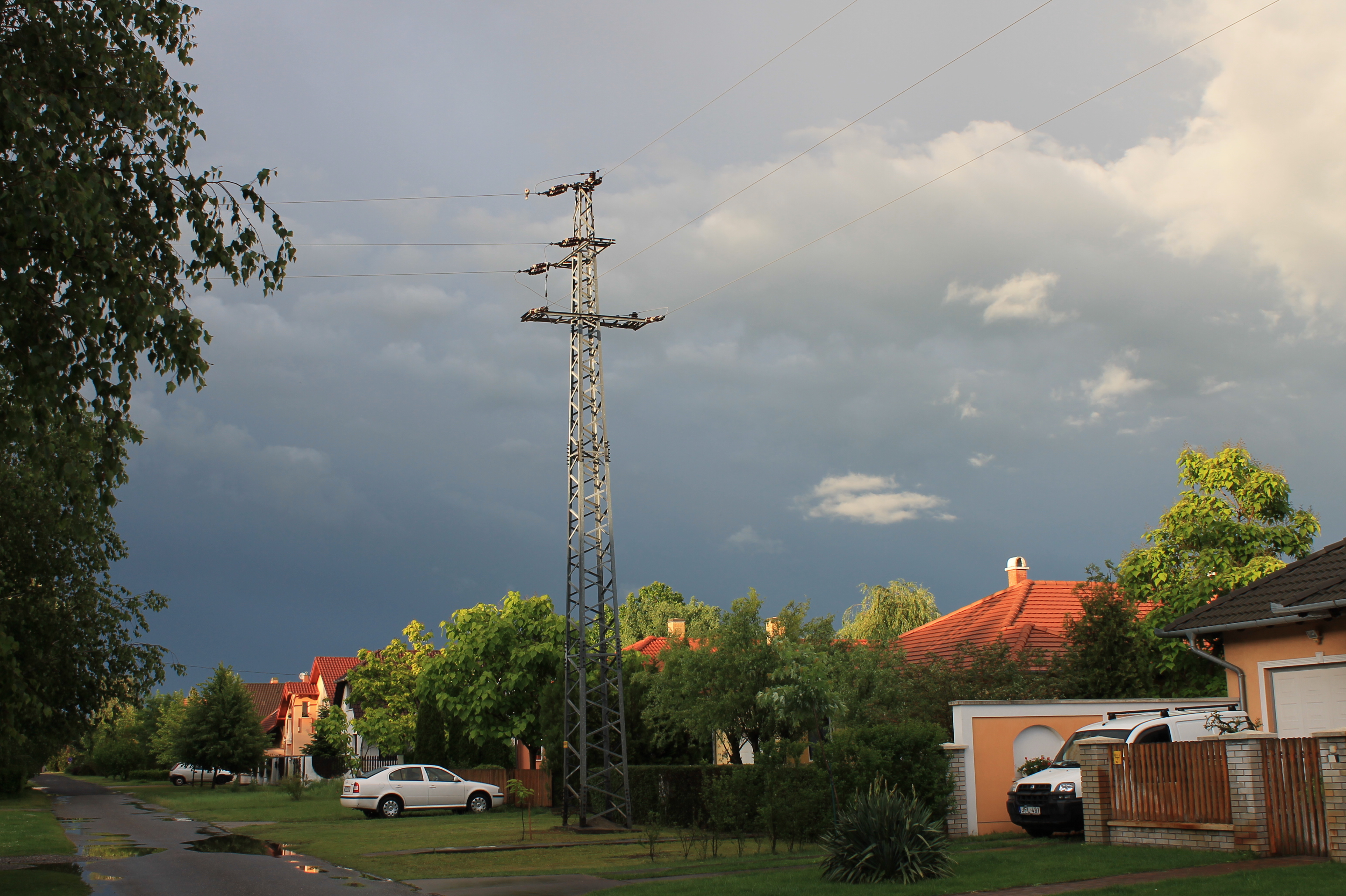
- Zsombó panorama

- Coat of arms
- Interactive map of Zsombó
- Country: Hungary
- County: Csongrád-Csanád

Area
  - Total: 26.90 km^{2} (10.39 sq mi)

Population (2002)
  - Total: 3,331
  - Density: 124/km^{2} (320/sq mi)
- Time zone: UTC+1 (CET)
  - Summer (DST): UTC+2 (CEST)
- Postal code: 6792
- Area code: 62

Zsombó is a large village in Csongrád-Csanád County, in the Southern Great Plain region of southern Hungary.

== Geography ==
It covers an area of 26.9 km^{2} (10 sq mi) and has a population of 3331 people (2001).
