= Pusztamérges =

Coordinates: 46°20′N 19°41′E

- Village
- Coat of arms
- Interactive map of Pusztamérges
- Country: Hungary
- County: Csongrád

Area
  - Total: 24.39 km^{2} (9.42 sq mi)

Population (2015)
  - Total: 1,124
  - Density: 46.1/km^{2} (119/sq mi)
- Time zone: UTC+1 (CET)
  - Summer (DST): UTC+2 (CEST)
- Postal code: 6785
- Area code: 62

Pusztamérges is a village in Csongrád county, in the Southern Great Plain region of southern Hungary.

== Geography ==
It covers an area of 24.39 km^{2} (9 sq mi) and has a population of 1124 people (2015).

== History ==
Ladislaus IV of Hungary stayed here with his Cuman wives, which gave the village its original name "Asszonyszállása" meaning "Women's landing". During this time, the village was already inhabited, and boasted a church, which no longer remains today. King Matthias Corvinus mentioned the village in a 1462 letter where he guaranteed the villagers grazing rights for their animals. In 1562 these grazing rights were reaffirmed by Maximilian II. In the wake of wars against the Ottomans, the village's population was wiped out. In 1572, the village was repopulated with Serbs. During the witch-trials that occurred in Szeged in 1721, a woman from Pusztamérges was tried.

== Demographics ==
As of 2022 88.6% of the population was Hungarian, 2% German, 0.3% Gypsy, and 2.5% of non-European origin. 9.7% did not answer.
