= Tömörkény =

Coordinates: 46°37′N 20°02′E

- Village
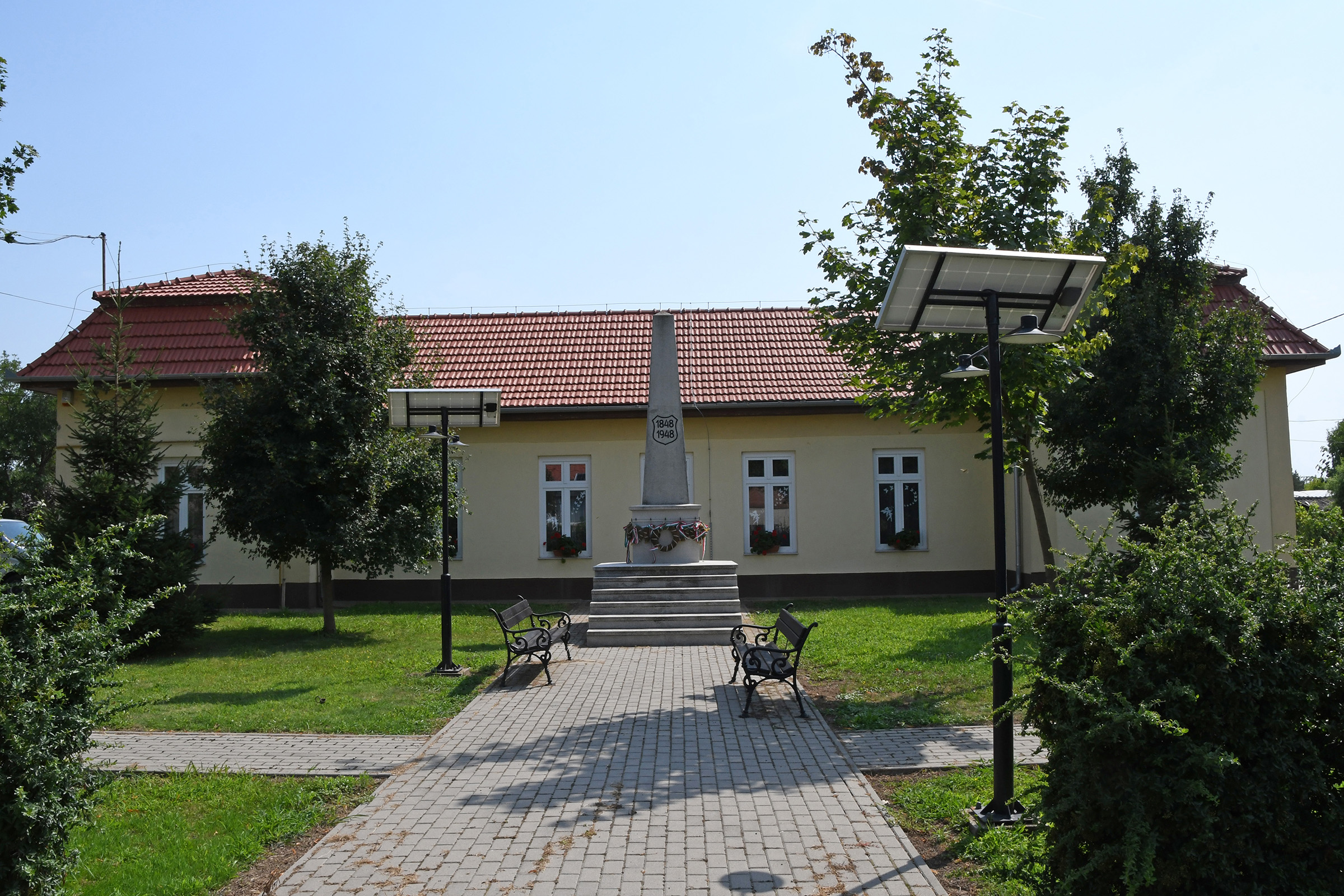
- Culture house in Tömörkény

- Coat of arms
- Interactive map of Tömörkény
- Country: Hungary
- County: Csongrád

Area
  - Total: 53.91 km^{2} (20.81 sq mi)

Population (2015)
  - Total: 1,712
  - Density: 37/km^{2} (96/sq mi)
- Time zone: UTC+1 (CET)
  - Summer (DST): UTC+2 (CEST)
- Postal code: 6646
- Area code: 63

Tömörkény is a village near the town of Csongrád in Csongrád county, in the Southern Great Plain region of southern Hungary.

== Geography ==
It covers an area of 53.91 km^{2} (21 sq mi) and in 2015 had a population of 1,712.

== History ==
The first settlement was built by the Sarmatians and the Avars. Archeological excavations uncovered a cemetery and iron working equipment. The village first appeared in writing in the 11th century, as "Temerken". The colloquial form is 'temürkän', meaning 'arrowhead' (Oghuz Turkic equivalent is 'dämrän'). In Turkish times, a small fortress defended the local people. The old village was a harbor to move through the Tisza River. Nowadays, it is a typical agricultural village.
