= Felgyő =

Coordinates: 46°39′N 20°06′E

- Village
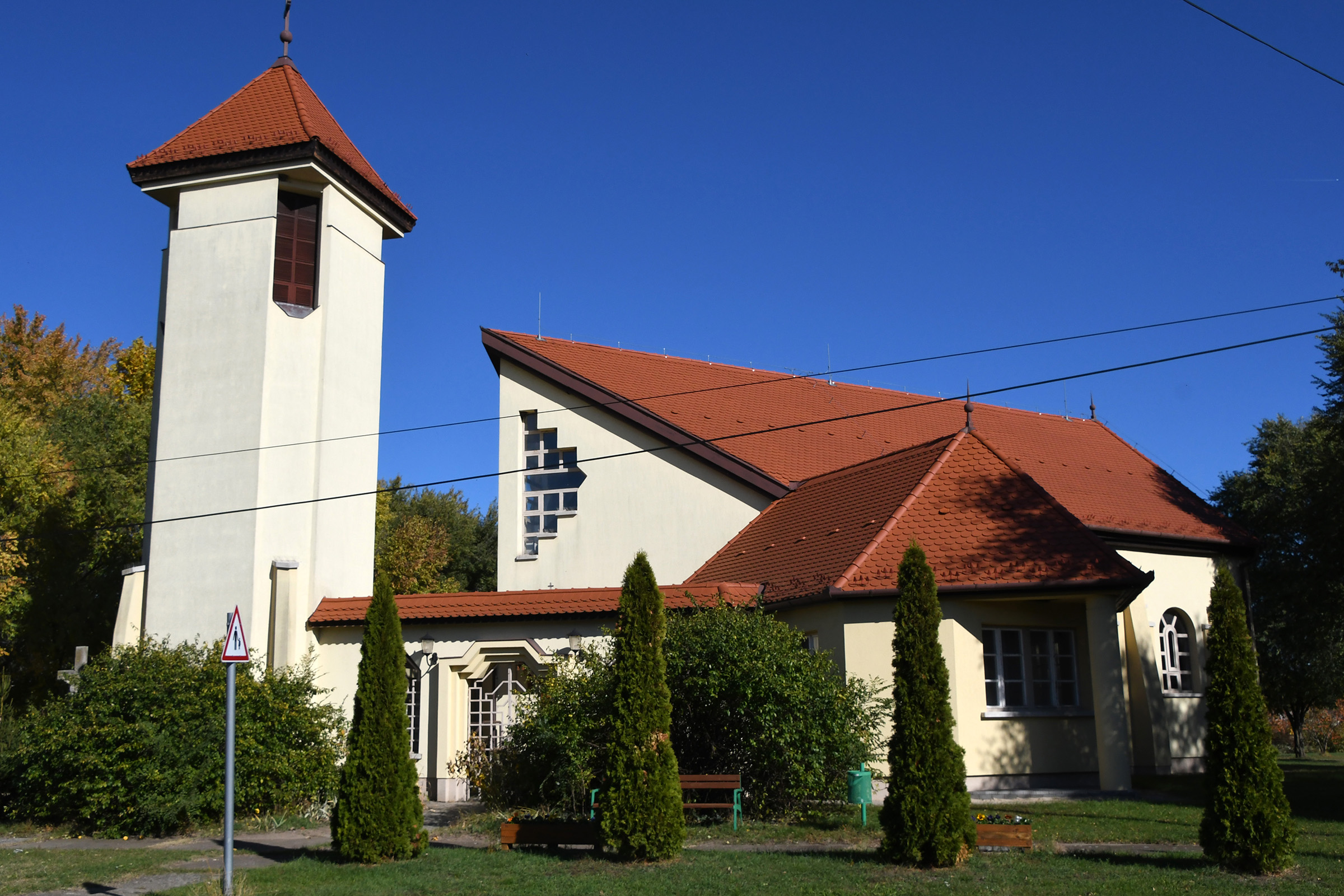
- Roman Catholic church in Felgyő

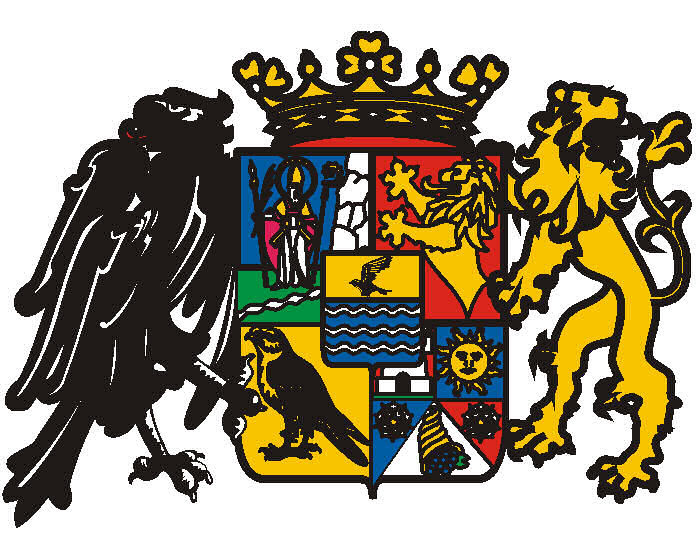
- Coat of arms
- Interactive map of Felgyő
- Country: Hungary
- County: Csongrád-Csanád

Area
  - Total: 76.73 km^{2} (29.63 sq mi)

Population (2002)
  - Total: 1,484
  - Density: 19/km^{2} (49/sq mi)
- Time zone: UTC+1 (CET)
  - Summer (DST): UTC+2 (CEST)
- Postal code: 6645
- Area code: 63

Felgyő is a village in Csongrád-Csanád County, in the Southern Great Plain region of southern Hungary.

== Geography ==
It covers an area of 76.73 km^{2} (30 sq mi) and has a population of 1484 people (2002).

== History ==
The settlement dates back to the Kingdom of Hungary, and the days of Árpád. The village already appeared in writing in 1075, by the name "Gehgi".

The village was a princely estate, belonging to Prince Álmos. After 1108 Prince Álmos gifted the lands to the provost of Dömös, along with 63 of his personal servants, and land to give to each.
