= Tiszasziget =

Coordinates: 46°10′N 20°10′E

- Village
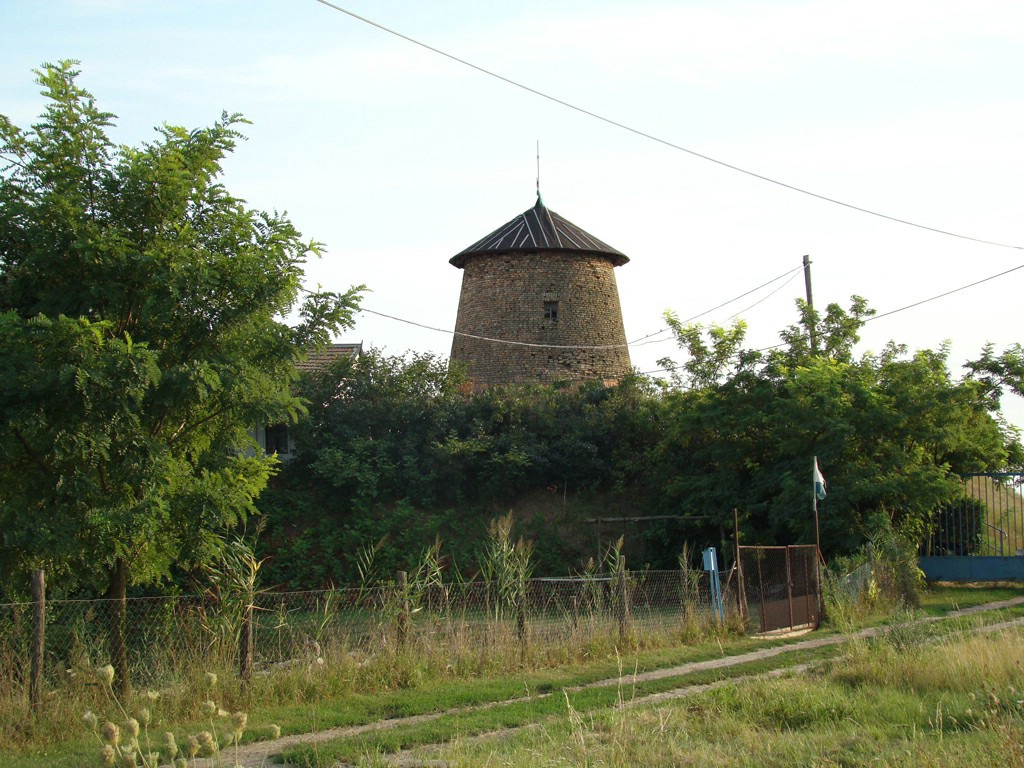
- Mill in Tiszasziget

- Coat of arms

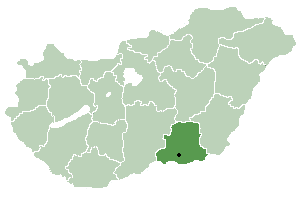
- Location of Csongrád County in Hungary
- Country: Hungary
- County: Csongrád

Area
  - Total: 26.89 km^{2} (10.38 sq mi)

Population (2015)
  - Total: 1,714
  - Density: 63.7/km^{2} (165/sq mi)
- Time zone: UTC+1 (CET)
  - Summer (DST): UTC+2 (CEST)
- Postal code: 6756
- Area code: 62

Tiszasziget is a village in Csongrád county, in the Southern Great Plain region of southern Hungary.

== Geography ==
It covers an area of 26.89 km^{2} (10 sq mi) and has a population of 1714 people (2015).

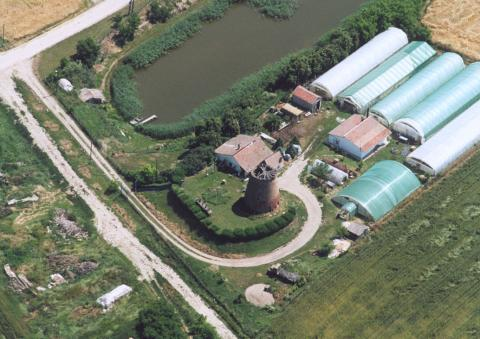
Aerial photography of Tiszasziget
