= Dóc =

Coordinates: 46°26′N 20°08′E

- Village
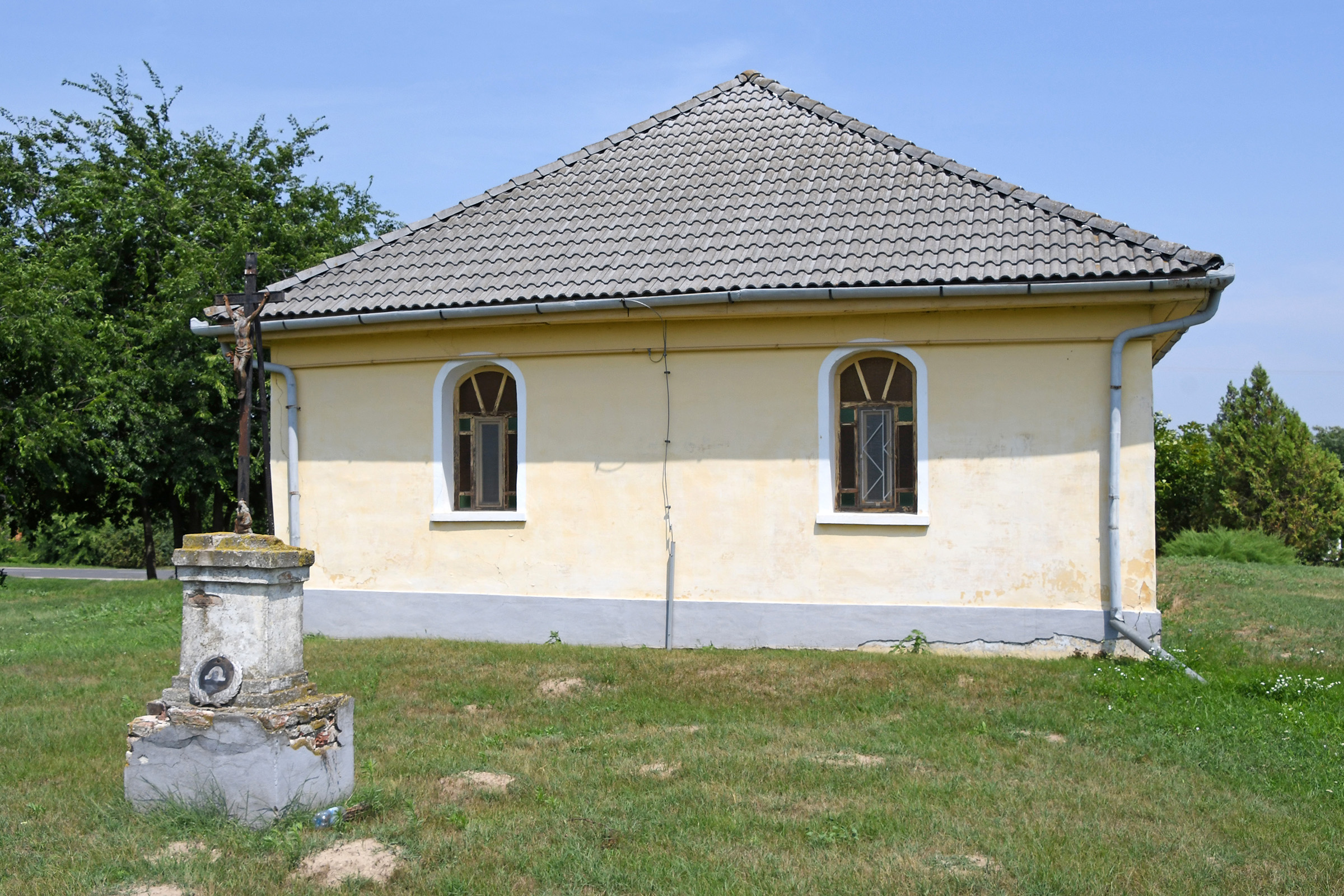
- Roman Catholic church in Dóc

- Coat of arms
- Interactive map of Dóc
- Country: Hungary
- County: Csongrád

Area
  - Total: 49.43 km^{2} (19.09 sq mi)

Population (2015)
  - Total: 707
  - Density: 14.3/km^{2} (37/sq mi)
- Time zone: UTC+1 (CET)
  - Summer (DST): UTC+2 (CEST)
- Postal code: 6766
- Area code: 62

Dóc is a village in Csongrád county, in the Southern Great Plain region of southern Hungary.

== Geography ==
It covers an area of 49.43 km^{2} (19 sq mi) and has a population of 707 people (2015).

== History ==
From the 1400s the landholder in the area was Dóczy Miklós. in 1803, ownership of the land passed into the hands of the Pallavicini family. Dóc was formed into an independent settlement in 1952.

Historically, the area around Dóc engaged in tobacco farming, but today other forms of farming, gardening, and animal husbandry are common.
