= Nagytőke =

Coordinates: 46°45′28.80″N 20°17′9.60″E

- Village
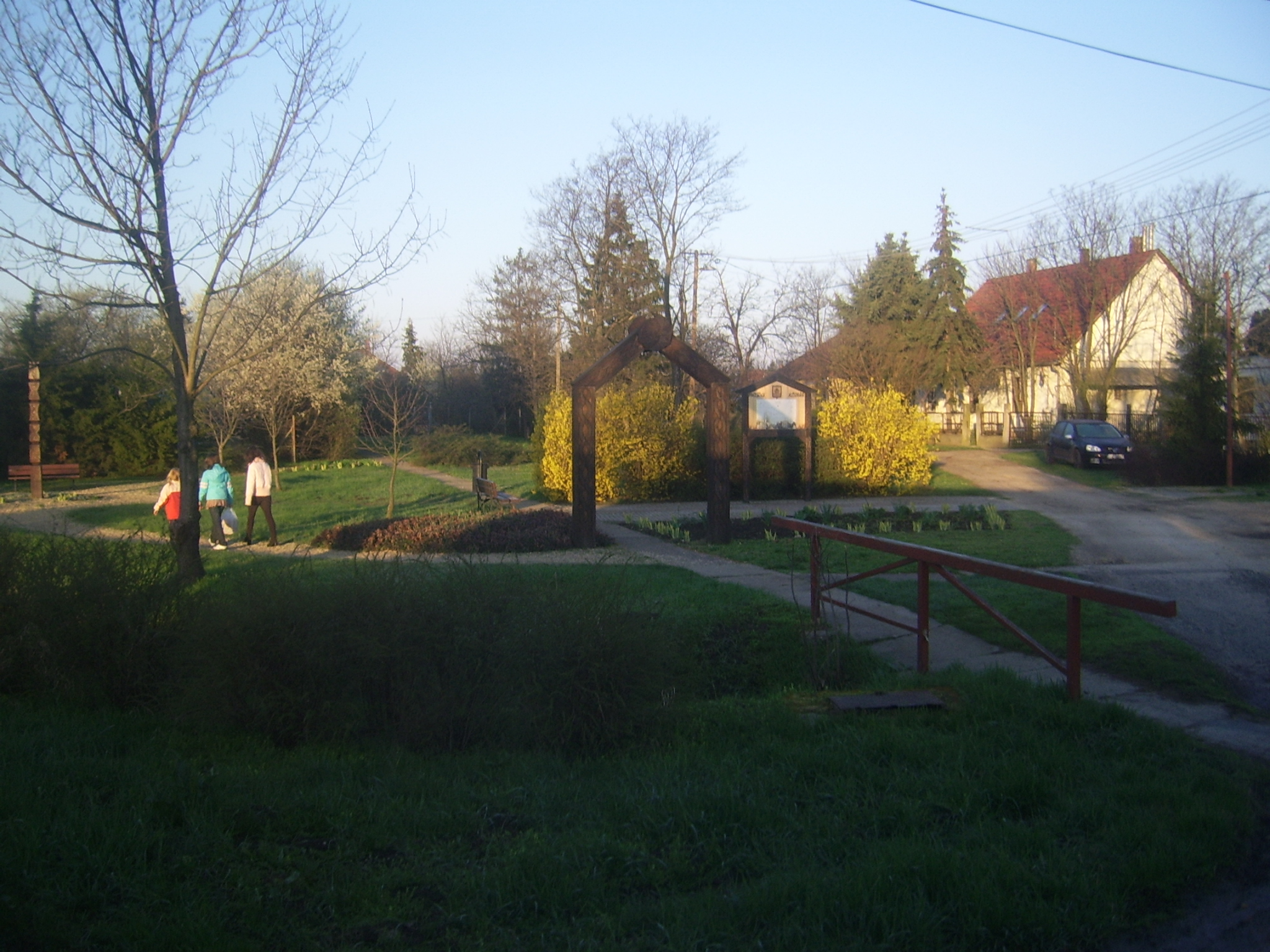
- Park in Jókai street

- Coat of arms
- Interactive map of Nagytőke
- Country: Hungary
- County: Csongrád

Area
  - Total: 54.68 km^{2} (21.11 sq mi)

Population (2002)
  - Total: 506
  - Density: 9/km^{2} (23/sq mi)
- Time zone: UTC+1 (CET)
  - Summer (DST): UTC+2 (CEST)
- Postal code: 6612
- Area code: 63

Nagytőke is a village in Csongrád county, in the Southern Great Plain region of southern Hungary.

== Geography ==
It covers an area of 54.68 km^{2} (21 sq mi) and has a population of 506 people (2002).

== History ==
The village's name first appeared in writing in 1488 under the name "Theuke". The name derives from the Hungarian word "Tőke" in reference to the villagers' woodcutting industry.

The Habsburg-Ottoman Wars has a devastating effect on the village. Turkish tax documents from the 1570s reference 26 families, but by 1599 the village was completely wiped out as a result of the devastation of the Long Turkish War. The village slowly rebuilt, but was again wiped out in 1693 by Crimean Tatars.

Nagytőke became an independent municipality in 1952, separating from the nearby Szentes.

== Elections ==
On September 4, 2016. Csaba Szél won the mayoral election in Nagytőke, he is a member of the Jobbik party.
