= Zákányszék =

Coordinates: 46°16′N 19°55′E

- Village
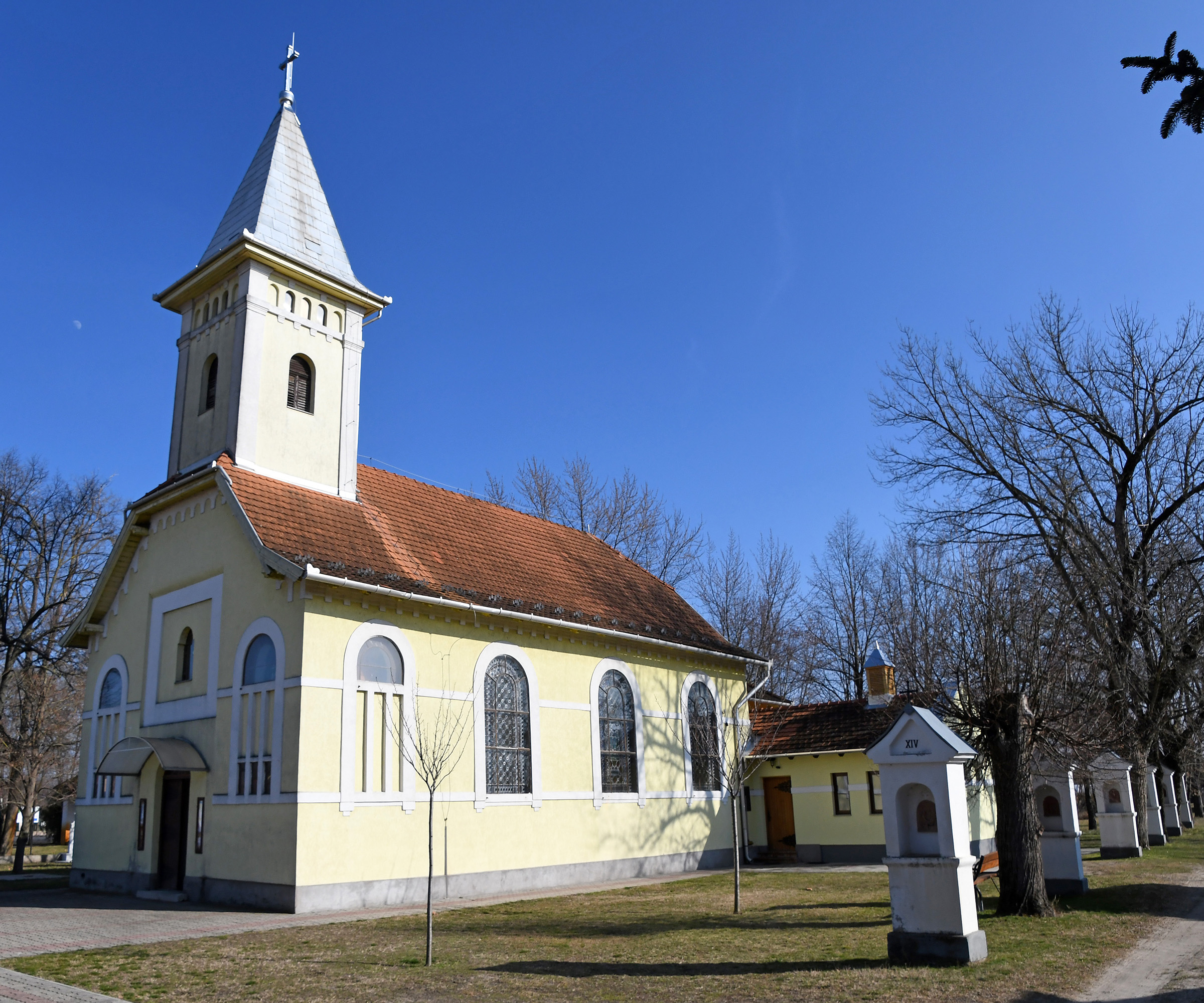
- Roman Catholic church in Zákányszék

- Coat of arms
- Interactive map of Zákányszék
- Country: Hungary
- County: Csongrád

Area
  - Total: 66.06 km^{2} (25.51 sq mi)

Population (2002)
  - Total: 2,800
  - Density: 42/km^{2} (110/sq mi)
- Time zone: UTC+1 (CET)
  - Summer (DST): UTC+2 (CEST)
- Postal code: 6787
- Area code: 62

Zákányszék is a village in Csongrád county, in the Southern Great Plain region of southern Hungary. It is home to a parrot farm.

== Geography ==
It covers an area of 66.06 km^{2} (26 sq mi) and has a population of 2,800 people (2002).
