= Nagyér =

Coordinates: 46°22′N 20°44′E

- Village
- Coat of arms
- Interactive map of Nagyér
- Country: Hungary
- County: Csongrád-Csanád

Area
  - Total: 12.29 km^{2} (4.75 sq mi)

Population (2015)
  - Total: 512
  - Density: 41.7/km^{2} (108/sq mi)
- Time zone: UTC+1 (CET)
  - Summer (DST): UTC+2 (CEST)
- Postal code: 6917
- Area code: 62

Nagyér is a village in Csongrád-Csanád County, in the Southern Great Plain region of southern Hungary.

== Geography ==
It covers an area of 12.29 km^{2} (5 sq mi) and has a population of 512 people (2015).
