= Pitvaros =

Village in Csongrád County, Hungary

Coordinates: 46.317°N 20.733°E

- Village
- Coat of arms
- Interactive map of Pitvaros
- Country: Hungary
- County: Csongrád

Area
  - Total: 13.14 km^{2} (5.07 sq mi)

Population (June 2008)
  - Total: 1,579
  - Density: 120/km^{2} (310/sq mi)
- Time zone: UTC+1 (CET)
  - Summer (DST): UTC+2 (CEST)
- Postal code: 6914
- Area code: 62

Pitvaros is a village in Csongrád county, in the Southern Great Plain region of southern Hungary.

== History ==
The area around Pitvaros has been inhabited since the Hungarian conquest of the Carpathian Basin, although the village's name does not appear in writing until the late Middle Ages. Pitvaros and the surrounding settlements were razed during a Turkish invasion in 1552, and for the next 250 years, the region was uninhabited.

The area was repopulated in 1816 when 175 Lutheran Slovak families were settled into the region from Nagylak. The new inhabitants built simple huts in a scattered fashion, until the Habsburgs sent city planners who laid out streets in a grid, and had the villagers rebuild their homes in organized lots.

Until the Second World War, the village had vast majority Slovak population. Following mass deportations of Hungarians out of Czechoslovakia, the Czechoslovak–Hungarian population exchange program facilitated the resettlement of around two-thirds of the Slovak villagers into Slovakia. In exchange, Hungarians mostly from the Czechoslovak town of Kolárovo were settled into Pitvaros. However, fewer Hungarians arrived than Slovaks, and the town's population fell by 700.

=== Jews in Pitvaros ===
Jews first arrived in Pitvaros in the 1820s, and by 1854 they already totalled about 14. The town's Jews engaged in business, buying up land for their homes and businesses in the town centre. In 1877, they established a Jewish cemetery. They never constructed a synagogue, so the town's Jews went to Makó for worship. In the 1880s and 1890s additional Jewish families arrived.

In March 1944, the town's Jews were transported to the Jewish ghetto in Makó. They were then transported by train through Szeged to Auschwitz, where all died.

== Geography ==
It covers an area of 13.14 km^{2} (5 sq mi) and has a population of 1579 people (2008).
