= Csongrád-Csanád County 4th constituency =

Constituency in Hungary (2012-)

Csongrád-Csanád County 4th constituency (Hódmezővásárhely)
- Constituency for the National Assembly
- Location of Csongrád-Csanád county 04 within Csongrád-Csanád county

- Location of Csongrád-Csanád county within Hungary
- County: Csongrád-Csanád
- Electorate: 80,170 (2022)
- Major settlements: Hódmezővásárhely

Current constituency
- Created: 2011 (modified 2024)
- Party: Tisza Party
- Member: Gábor Ferenczi
- Elected: 2026

The 4th constituency of Csongrád-Csanád County (Hungarian: Csongrád-Csanád megyei 04. számú országgyűlési egyéni választókerület) is one of the single member constituencies of the National Assembly, the national legislature of Hungary. The constituency standard abbreviation: Csongrád-Csanád 04. OEVK.

Since 2026, it has been represented by Gábor Ferenczi of the Tisza Party.

== Geography ==
The 4th constituency is located in eastern part of Csongrád-Csanád County.

=== List of municipalities ===
The constituency includes the following municipalities:

1. Algyő
2. Ambrózfalva
3. Apátfalva
4. Csanádalberti
5. Csanádpalota
6. Ferencszállás
7. Földeák
8. Hódmezővásárhely
9. Királyhegyes
10. Kiszombor
11. Klárafalva
12. Kövegy
13. Magyarcsanád
14. Makó
15. Maroslele
16. Mártély
17. Nagyér
18. Nagylak
19. Óföldeák
20. Pitvaros
21. Székkutas

== Members ==
The constituency was first represented by János Lázár of the Fidesz from 2014, and he was re-elected in 2018 and 2022. In the 2026 election, Gábor Ferenczi of the Tisza Party was elected representative.

Election	Member	Party	%	Ref.
2014	János Lázár	Fidesz	43.57	
2018	János Lázár	Fidesz	51.78	
2022	János Lázár	Fidesz	51.77	
2026	Gábor Ferenczi	Tisza Party	58.36	
