= Makó District =

Coordinates: 46.2167°N 20.9833°E

Makó District Makói járás
- Districts of Hungary
- Flag Coat of arms

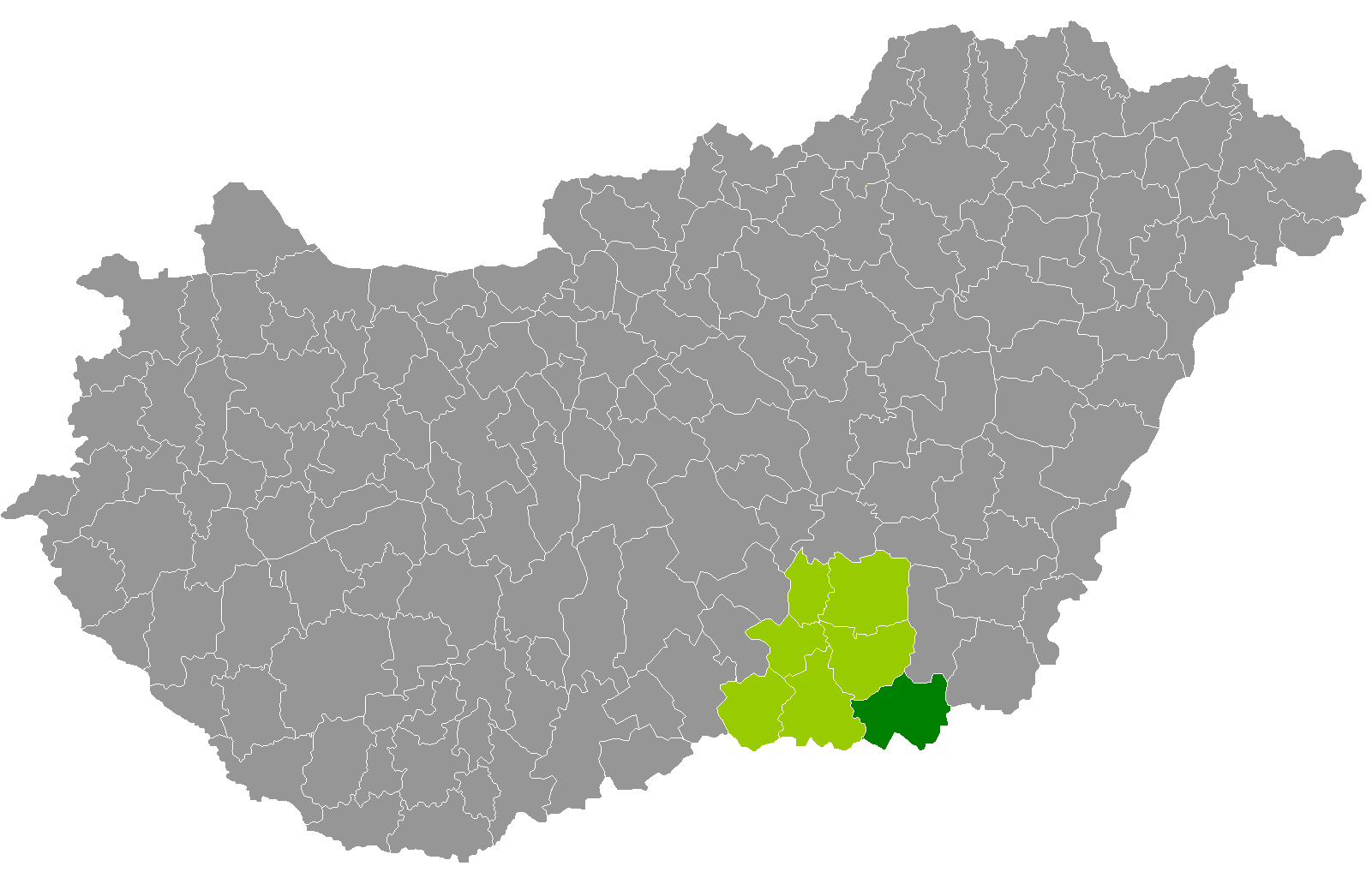
- Makó District within Hungary and Csongrád County.
- Country: Hungary
- County: Csongrád
- District seat: Makó

Area
  - Total: 688.85 km^{2} (265.97 sq mi)
  - Rank: 4th in Csongrád

Population (2011 census)
  - Total: 45,138
  - Rank: 3rd in Csongrád
  - Density: 66/km^{2} (170/sq mi)

Makó (Hungarian: Makói járás) is a district in south-eastern part of Csongrád County. Makó is also the name of the town where the district seat is found. The district is located in the Southern Great Plain Statistical Region.

== Geography ==
Makó District borders with Hódmezővásárhely District and Orosháza District (Békés County) to the north, the Romanian counties of Arad to the east and Timiș to the south, Szeged District to the west. The number of the inhabited places in Makó District is 15.

== Municipalities ==
The district has 2 towns, 1 large village and 12 villages. (ordered by population, as of 1 January 2012)

- Ambrózfalva (486)
- Apátfalva (2,941)
- Csanádalberti (434)
- **Csanádpalota** (2,968)
- Földeák (3,025)
- Királyhegyes (662)
- Kiszombor (3,772)
- Kövegy (377)
- Magyarcsanád (1,458)
- **Makó** (23,573) – district seat
- Maroslele (2,047)
- Nagyér (480)
- Nagylak (466)
- Óföldeák (451)
- Pitvaros (1,341)

The bolded municipalities are cities, italics municipality is large village.

== Demographics ==
Religion in Makó District (2011 census)
1. Catholic Church (36.6%)
2. Greek Catholicism (1.80%)
3. Calvinism (11.5%)
4. Lutheranism (0.90%)
5. Orthodoxy (0.70%)
6. Other religions (1.50%)
7. Non-religious (25.9%)
8. Atheists (1.00%)
9. Undeclared (20.1%)

In 2011, it had a population of 45,138 and the population density was 66/km^{2}.

Year	County population	Change
2011	45,138	n/a

=== Ethnicity ===
Besides the Hungarian majority, the main minorities are the Roma (approx. 1,200), Romanian (650), Slovak (200), German (150) and Serb (100).

Total population (2011 census): 45,138
Ethnic groups (2011 census): Identified themselves: 43,043 persons:

- Hungarians: 40,574 (94.26%)
- Gypsies: 1,101 (2.56%)
- Romanians: 662 (1.54%)
- Others and indefinable: 706 (1.64%)

Approx. 2,000 persons in Makó District did not declare their ethnic group at the 2011 census.

=== Religion ===
Religious adherence in the county according to 2011 census:

- Catholic – 17,365 (Roman Catholic – 16,535; Greek Catholic – 827);
- Reformed – 5,187;
- Evangelical – 411;
- Orthodox – 292;
- other religions – 675;
- Non-religious – 11,672;
- Atheism – 464;
- Undeclared – 9,072.

== Gallery ==
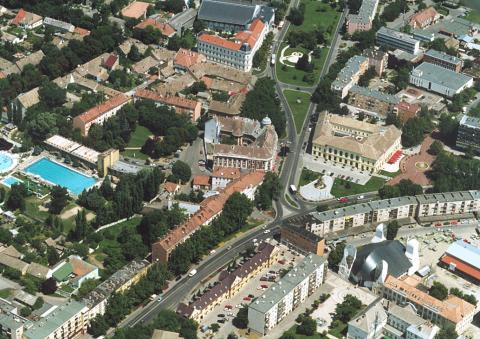
Makó, the Capital of onion

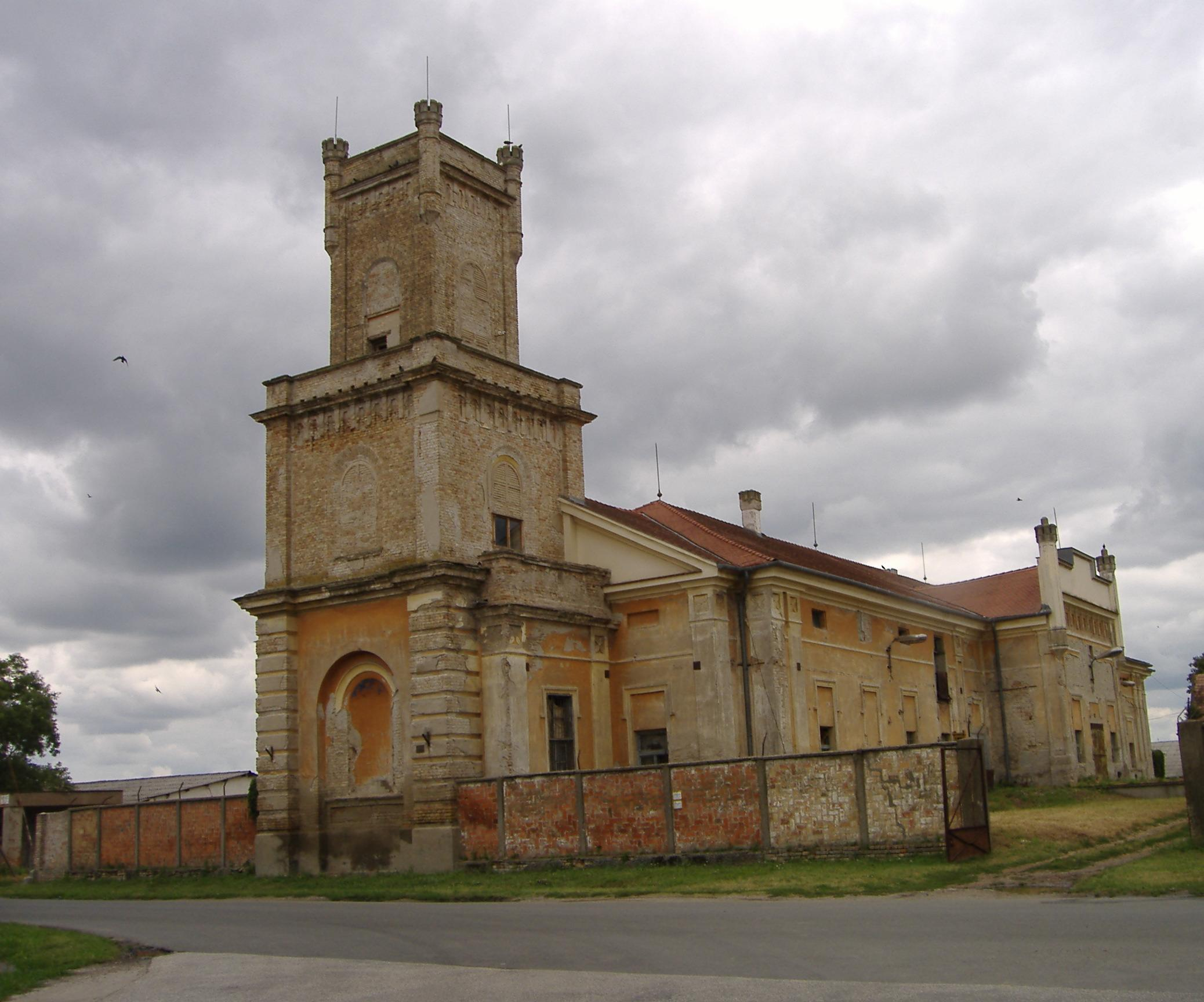
Rónay Castle in Kiszombor

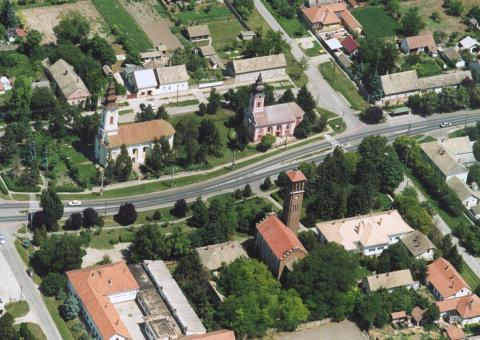
Aerial view of Magyarcsanád

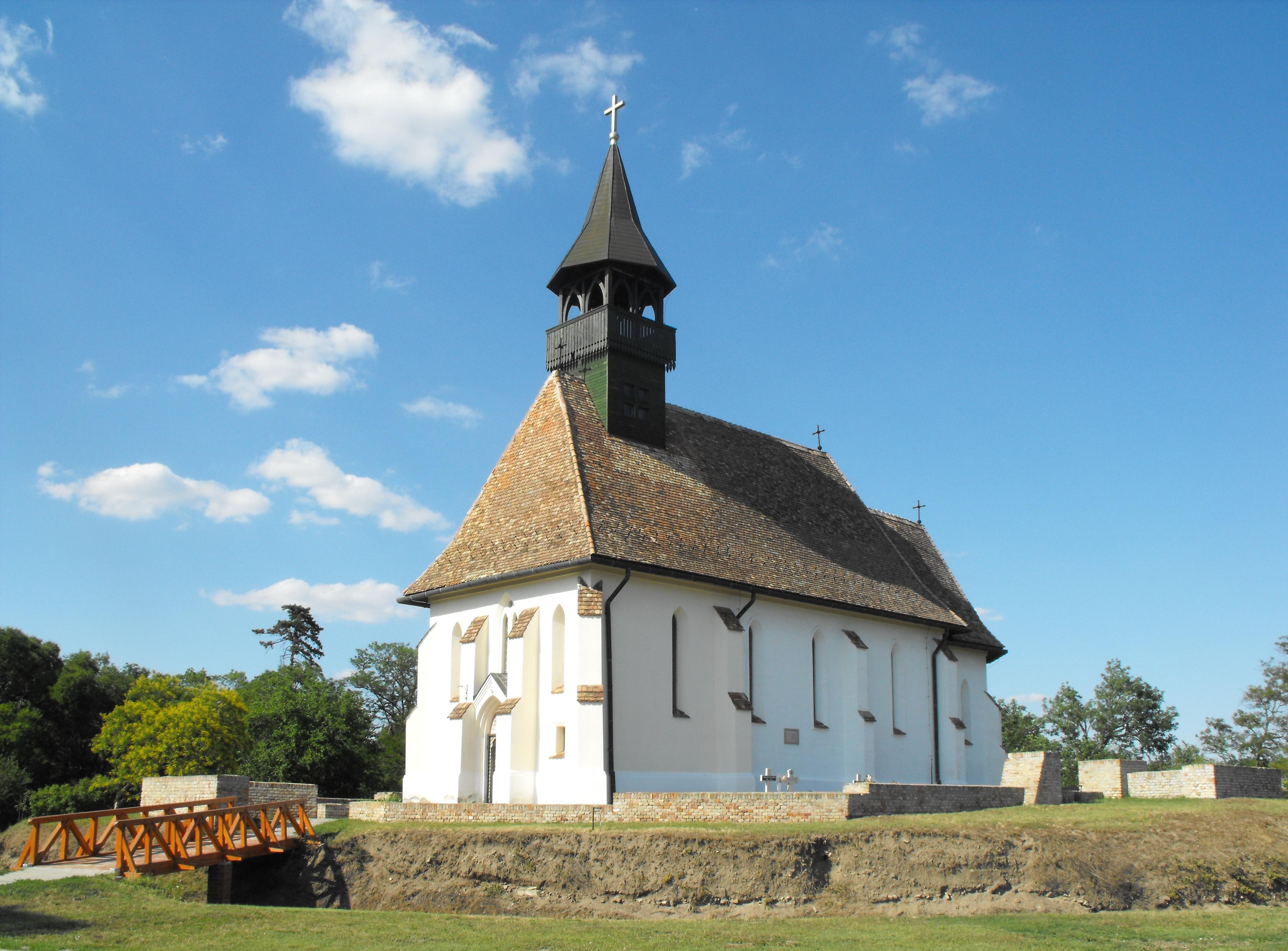
Roman Catholic Church in Óföldeák

== See also ==
- List of cities and towns of Hungary
