= Csanádpalota =

- Town
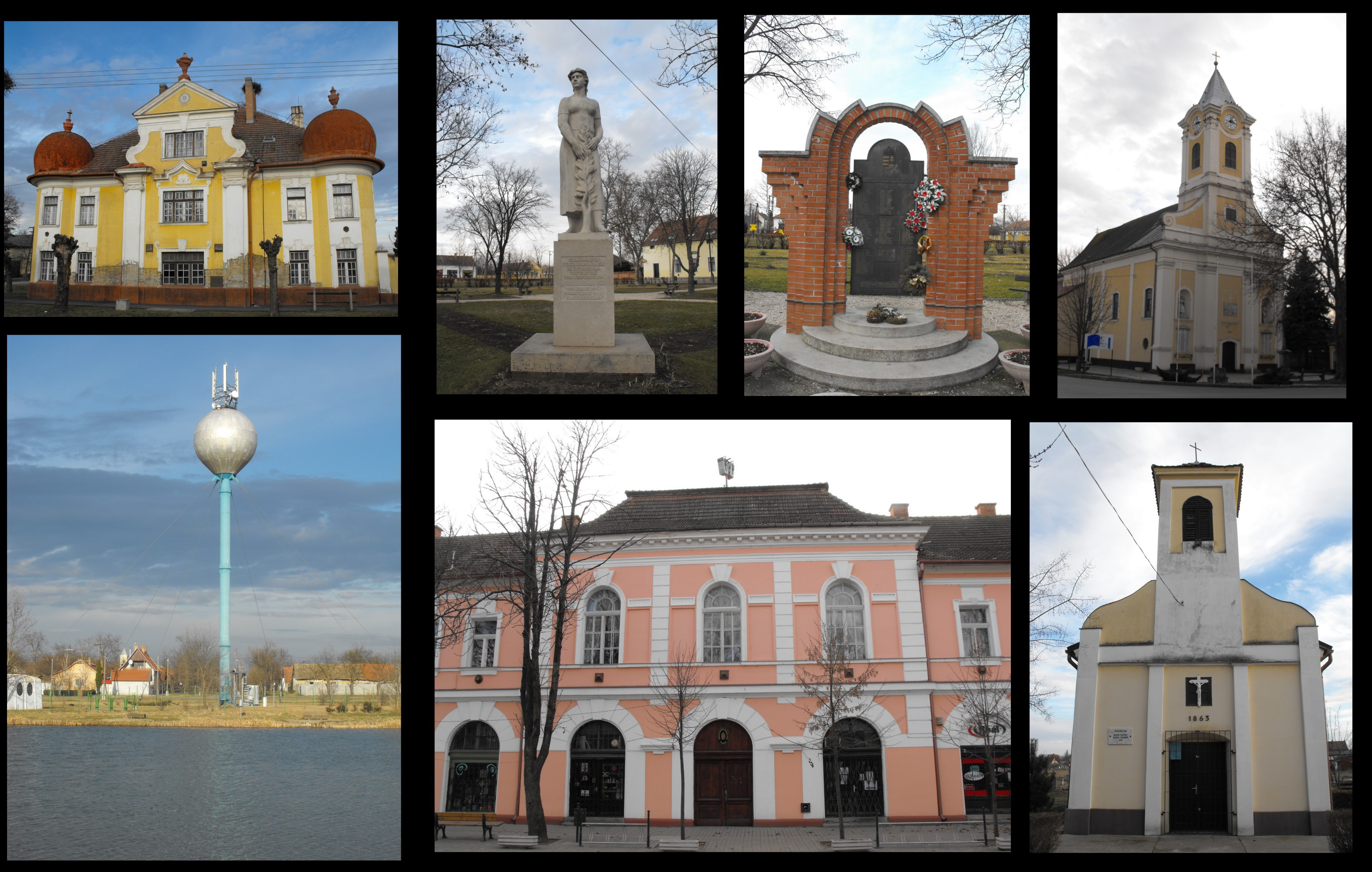
- The sights of Csanádpalota

- Coat of arms

- Location within Csongrád County Location within Hungary
- Coordinates: 46.25°N 20.73°E
- Country: Hungary
- County: Csongrád
- District: Makó

Government
  - Type: Mayor–council
  - Mayor: István Debreczeni

Area
  - Total: 77.76 km^{2} (30.02 sq mi)

Population (2010)
  - Total: 3,012
  - Density: 38.72/km^{2} (100.3/sq mi)
- Time zone: UTC+1 (CET)
  - Summer (DST): UTC+2 (CEST)
- Postal code: 6913
- Area code: (+36) 62
- Website: www.csanadpalota.hu

Csanádpalota (in Romanian: Palatul Cenad) is a town in the Makó-region of Csongrád county, in Hungary's Southern Great Plain.

== Geography ==
Csanádpalota covers an area of 77.76 km^{2} (30 sq mi) and has a population of 3286 people (2002). It is located close to the Romanian state border about 20 km from the town of Makó. Adjacent communities include Kövegy (4 km. distant), Pitvaros (11 km.), and Nagylak (10 km.). Csanádpalota has railroad access via the Ujszeged-Mezőhegyes section of Lane 121 of the Hungarian State Railroad System (MÁV). Bus access is available via 18 bus lines that pass through the town (eight of them run until Szeged), and there are three bus stops within the town borders of Csanádpalota.

== History ==
The first recorded mention of Csanádpalota (then a village) in the national archives is dated 1421. At that time it was owned by the Jánki family of Nagylak. The landowner had an elegant mansion there, and the name of the town (which translates to "palace of county Csanád") refers to it. Six years later, in 1427, Sigismund of Luxemburg granted the lands of Csanádpalota to Albert Nagymihályi, the viceroy of Dalmatia and Croatia. The lands surrounding the village belonged to the Hunyadi family, and were maintained until 1552 when Turkish invaders under the control of Suleiman the Magnificent devastated it. In 1562 Slovak families were settled in the nearly depopulated village, and it was rechristened Tótpalota (meaning "Slovak palace"). Subsequent to the fall of Gyula to the Turks in the fourth Ottoman–Habsburg war, Csanádpalota was again nearly depopulated. In 1637 the reigning prince of Transylvania, Mihály Apafi the 1st, became landowner and the village was renamed Mezőpalota ("field palace"). Between 1646 and 1649, during the reign of Prince Georg Rákóczi of Transylvania, the land was owned by Bishop Thomas Pálffy and had been repopulated by Hungarians. After the Turks left Csanád County it was annexed by Arad.

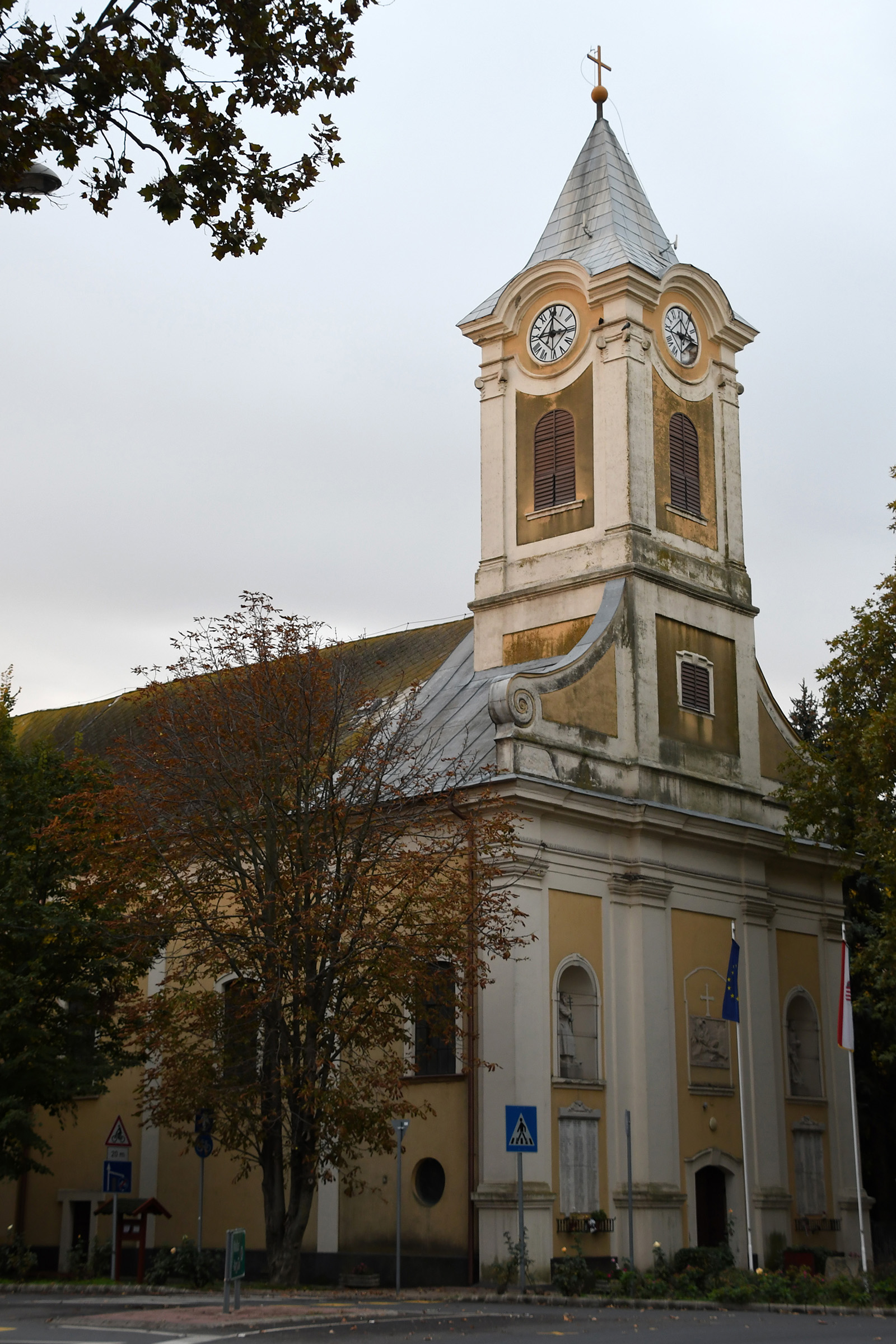
The town's Roman Catholic church was established in 1763 through the special efforts of Supreme judge György Fekete.

In 1750 Queen Maria Theresia introduced German immigrants to help cultivate the fields of Csanádpalota, but the immigrants were unwilling to live together with Slovak, Wallachian and Serbian inhabitants. The immigrant population eventually left to join the village of Perjámos whose German population was considerably larger, and Csanádpalota was left largely uninhabited. Austria then attempted to revive the village through the settlement of Hungarian Catholics and volunteers from several Hungarian counties (Gömör, Nógrád, Heves, and Hont). The name Csanádpalota was officially reestablished in 1756. After 7 years (in 1763), due to the efforts of Supreme judge György Fekete the village erected a Roman Catholic church.

The village structure was developed in an arrangement similar to that of a typical southern Hungarian community. The distribution of lots was carried out by the Austrian Chamber of Engineers around 1850. At that time, two new villages, Kövegy and Királyhegyes, were formed from land belonging to Csanádpalota. The town's two-story school was built in 1857, and preschool educational facilities received a home in the kindergarten building which was completed in 1893. The same year, the town post office and railway station were built. Around this time, during the period of Austro-Hungarian dualism, a brick factory was also constructed in Csanádpalota.

After World War I the village was occupied by Romanian forces for a short period and, as stipulated by the Treaty of Trianon, part of the lands of Csanádpalota were given to Romania. Internal Hungarian restructuring immediately following Trianon led to the reapportionment of land such that outlying areas of the village Nagylak were given to Csanádpalota to increase its size. The village belonged for short periods to several Hungarian counties (Csanád, Arad, and Torontál) before eventually being annexed by Csongrád County. During the period of redistricting, several flour mills and cooperatives were established within the village and in 1937 it received electricity. The major employers of citizens of the village at this time were the Blaskovics Manor and the Nagylak Hemp Factory. During the late thirties, farmers from Makó introduced onion cultivation to Csanádpalota.

During World War II, 165 citizens were killed in action. Csanádpalota lost some of its territory through redistricting after the war, by giving the land today known as Nagykirályhegyes to Királyhegyes. Throughout the thirties and forties the village became home to military border guards.

The village of Csanádpalota was promoted to a town on July 1, 2009. A new kindergarten building (equipped with solar heating), was completed during the summer of 2010.

== Culture and education ==
Csanádpalota is home to Napsugár ("sunshine") Kindergarten and the István Déri General School (grade 1–8), the latter of which is located in two buildings. The number of pupils in 2002 was 292. Upper-level classes are taught in the two-storied central building. The middle school and the elementary school are in separate buildings (on Sirály street and St. Steven street), and are equipped with gymnastic rooms and technical workshops. In 1982 the school acquired 10 Commodore computers and became one of the first in the county to introduce computer education. They also established a laboratory for teaching languages. In addition to these, the school offers education in art, music, and handcraft instruction. The music department was established in 1997/98 and the school brass band has won several awards in Csongrád county. Since 2006, the educational efforts of the high school have been supported by a branch of the Gyula Juhász High School of the Reformed Church in Makó, with both a day section and a correspondence section.

The László Kelemen Culture Center contains a library with a floor area of 237 square meters, and it is open 6 days a week including Saturdays.

== Population demographics ==
- Ethnic distribution (2001) - 96.1% of the town is Hungarian, 0.3% Gypsy, 0.2% German, 0.2% Romanian, 0.2% Slovak, and 0.1% Slovene, with 3.6% uncertain or failing to answer.
- Denominational distribution (2001) - 75.2% of the population consider themselves Roman Catholic, 0.2% Uniate or Greek Catholic, 4.9% Reformed Church, 1.5% Evangelical (Lutheran), 1.1% belong to various other religious organizations, 10% belong to no church, and 7.1% failed to answer.

== Notable landmarks ==
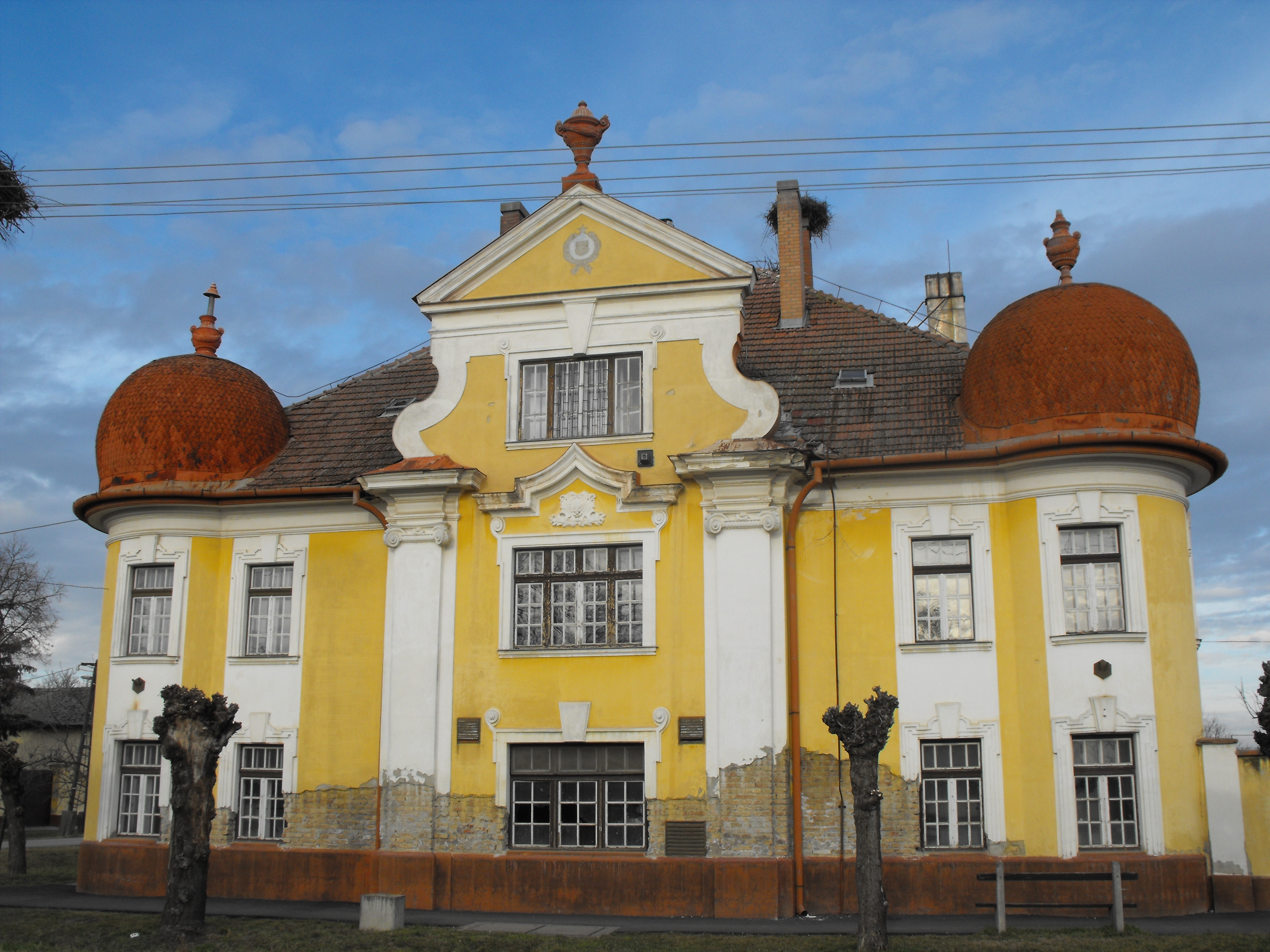
The chief constable's residence marks an important historical building in the center of Csanádpalota.

Prominent and historical landmarks within Csanádpalota include the Town Hall, The Roman Catholic Church and cemetery containing the tomb of László Kelemen (director of the first Hungarian theater), the chapel in the cemetery, the former synagog and Middle-Csanád-style Jewish cemetery, the ruins of the Zellman-Mill (a historically significant industrial building), the former residence of the chief constable prior to 1946 (a historically significant mansion), and the cornerstone the castle of Csanád (a historical community meeting place).

A number of commemorative statues are located throughout the town including the statue of László Kelemen at the House of Culture, the World War II and 1956 Revolution memorial, and the Tomb of the Unknown Soldier. Commemorative tablets and markers in town also celebrate notable town figures including László Ablonczy, István Iglódi, Lajos Kálmány, and Mihály Lőcsei, and events including the first introduction of natural gas in the village, the Hungarian Millennium, liberation and independence, and the town's volunteer firefighters. Other markers of note include the town's relief painting by István Déri, and the town's "Pro patria et libertate" flag.

== Notable residents ==
- Henrik Brengarten - Town clerk and former resident
- András Gyenes Dienes - Noted Petőfi scholar and Csanádpalota native
- Lajos Kálmány - Noted musicologist/folklorist, and former resident
- László Kelemen - Director of the first Hungarian theater, and former resident
- Tibor Mikulich - First lieutenant of the armored forces (1914-1960) and Csanádpalota native
