= Gábor Ferenczi (Tisza Party politician) =

Hungarian politician

Member of the National Assembly
- Assuming office 9 May 2026
- Succeeding: János Lázár
- Constituency: Csongrád-Csanád 4th

Personal details
- Born: 1982 or 1983 (age 42–43)
- Party: Tisza

Gábor Ferenczi is a Hungarian politician who was elected member of the National Assembly in 2026. He previously worked as a real estate agent and real estate appraiser.
