= Bökény =

Coordinates: 46°9′24″N 20°39′37″E

Bökény is an outskirt belonging to the settlement Magyarcsanád in Hungary. Bökény is located directly near the Maros (in Hungarian; in Romanian: Mureș), at the Romanian-Hungarian border. Here is a tumulus (Hungarian: kunhalom) in which archeological artefacts were found.
