= Kiszombor =

- Large village
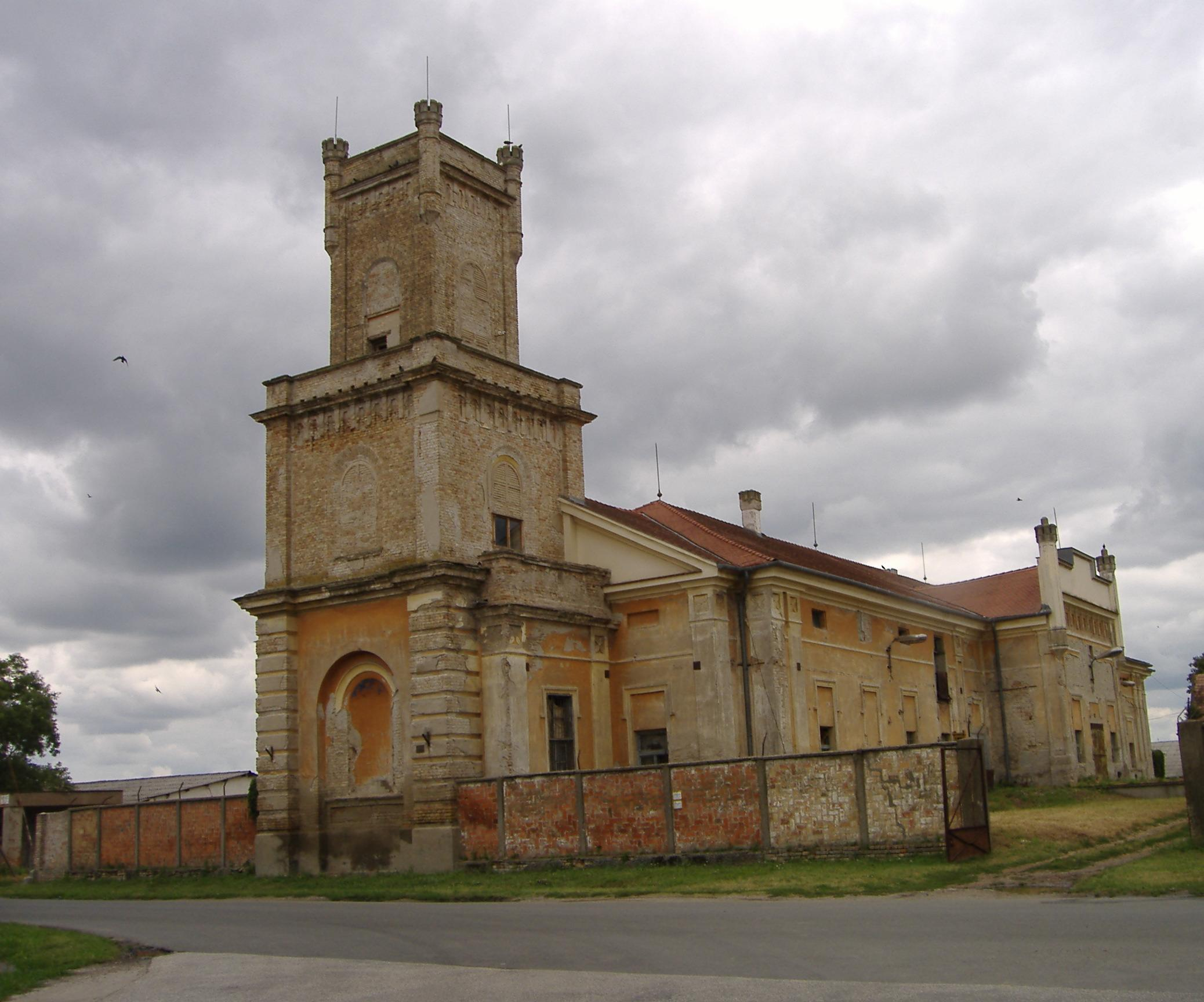
- Rónay-castle

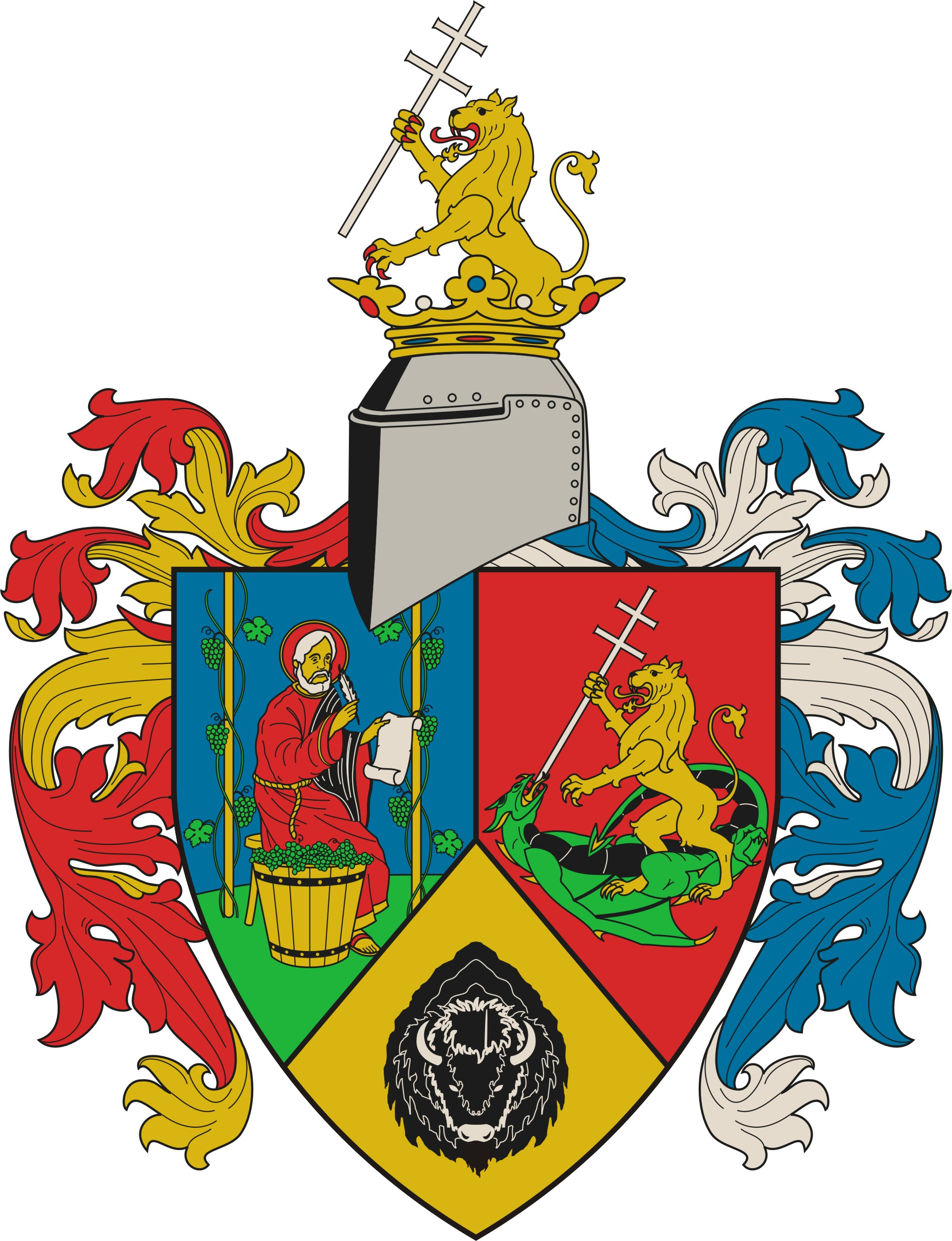
- Coat of arms

- Location in Hungary
- Coordinates: 46°11′10″N 20°25′40″E
- Country: Hungary
- County: Csongrád
- District: Makó

Area
  - Total: 65.81 km^{2} (25.41 sq mi)

Population (1 January 2015)
  - Total: 3,795
  - Density: 57.12/km^{2} (147.9/sq mi)
- Time zone: UTC+1 (CET)
  - Summer (DST): UTC+2 (CEST)
- Postal code: 6775
- Area code: (+36) 62

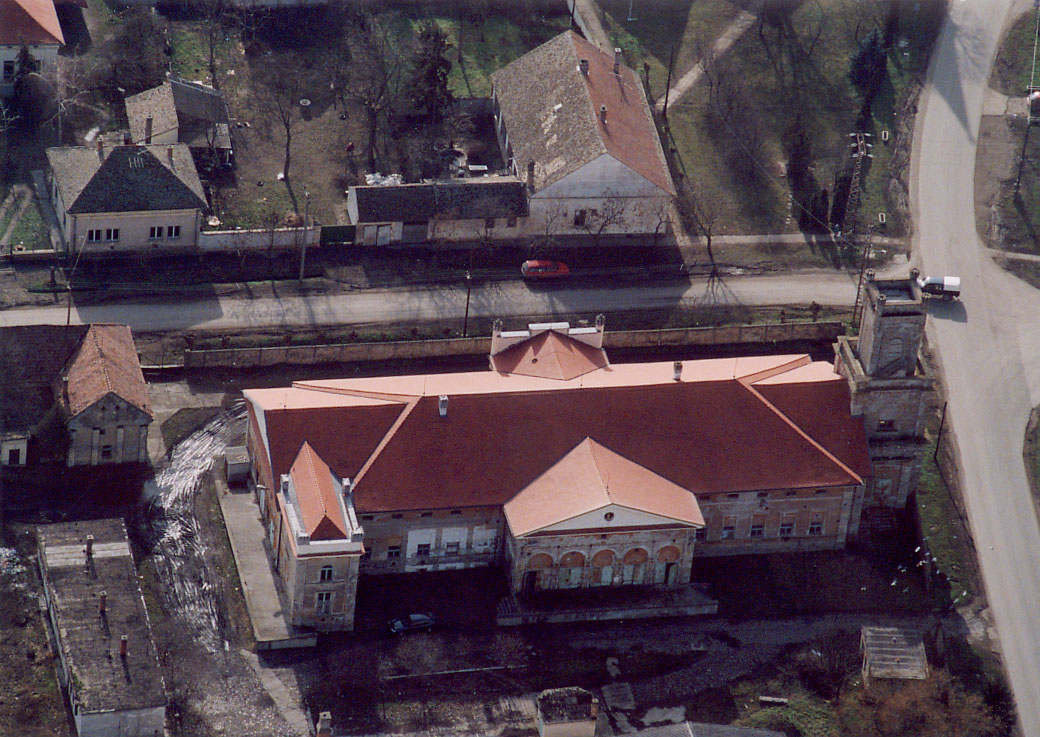
Kiszombor - Rónay-castle from above

Kiszombor is a large village in Csongrád-Csanád County, in the Southern Great Plain region of southern Hungary. It is over 800 years old.

== Geography ==
It covers an area of 65.81 km^{2} (25 sq mi) and has a population of 3795 people (2015). It is an agricultural village, near the Maros River.

There is a border-crossing point into Romania near the village, where the first village is Cenad.

There is a village-festival on the third weekend of September every year. A number of Hungarian artists appear, play, sing, dance and so on.

== Sightseeing for visitors ==
In the village a number of old architectural heritage from the Romanesque art to Romantic art can be seen.

=== Churches ===
Rotunda (Szent István tér)

The rotunda was built in the 12th century with a circular ground plan outside and with sixfold arched inside. There are only 3 such churches in Europe, all 3 in the late Kingdom of Hungary (and in the Carpathian Basin), in the east part of it: Kiszombor, Gerény and Karcsa. Relatives of this rotunda-type could be found in the Caucasus. The frescos were painted in the 14th century and 18th century. In 1776 a rectangular church was attached to the rotunda, later in 1910 a big Roman Catholic Church was attached to it, the rotunda used to be their chapel.

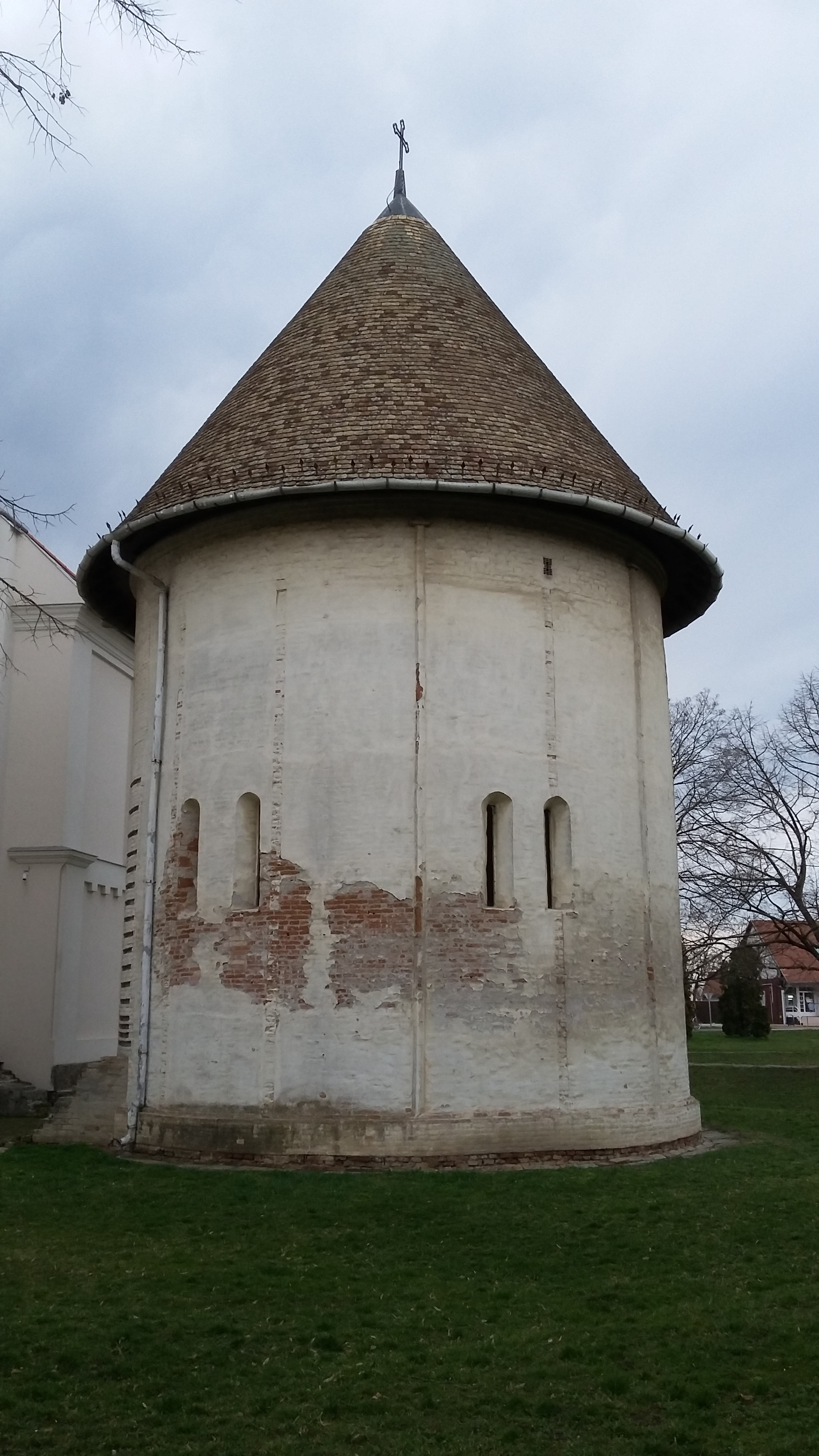
Rotunda, Kiszombor

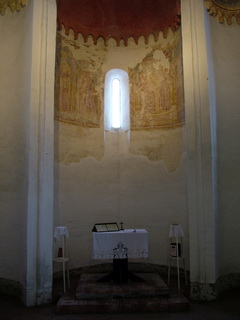
Inside, Rotunda

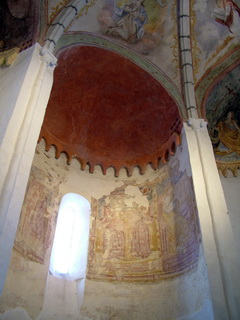
Frescos, inside, Rotunda

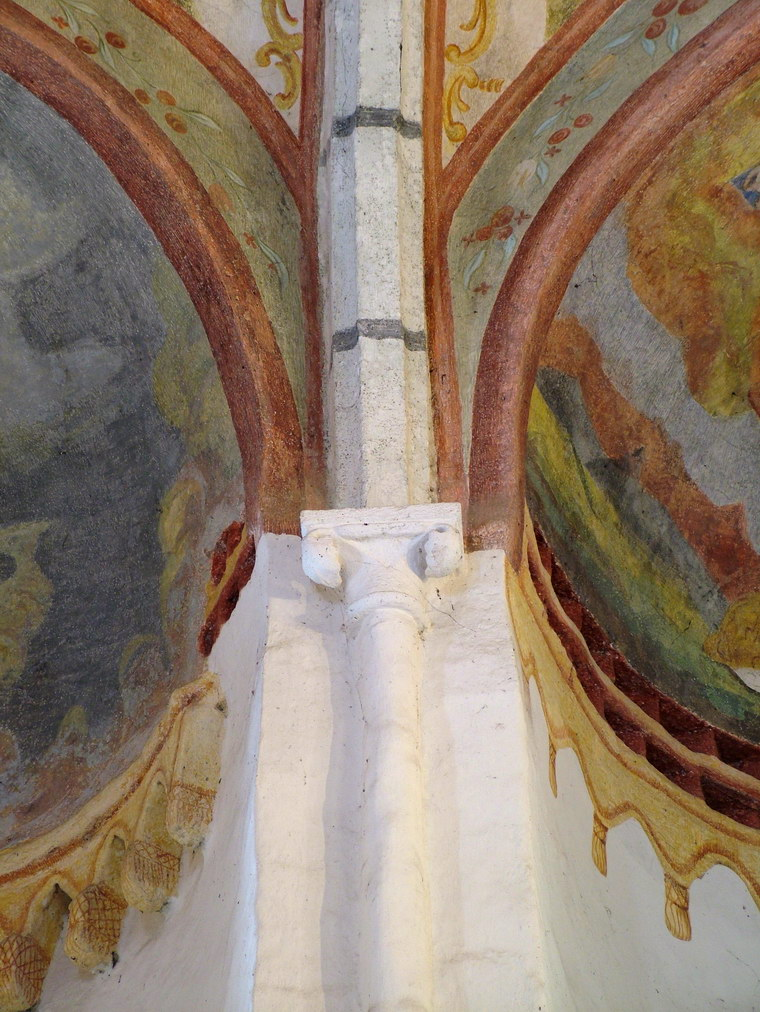
Details, inside, Rotunda

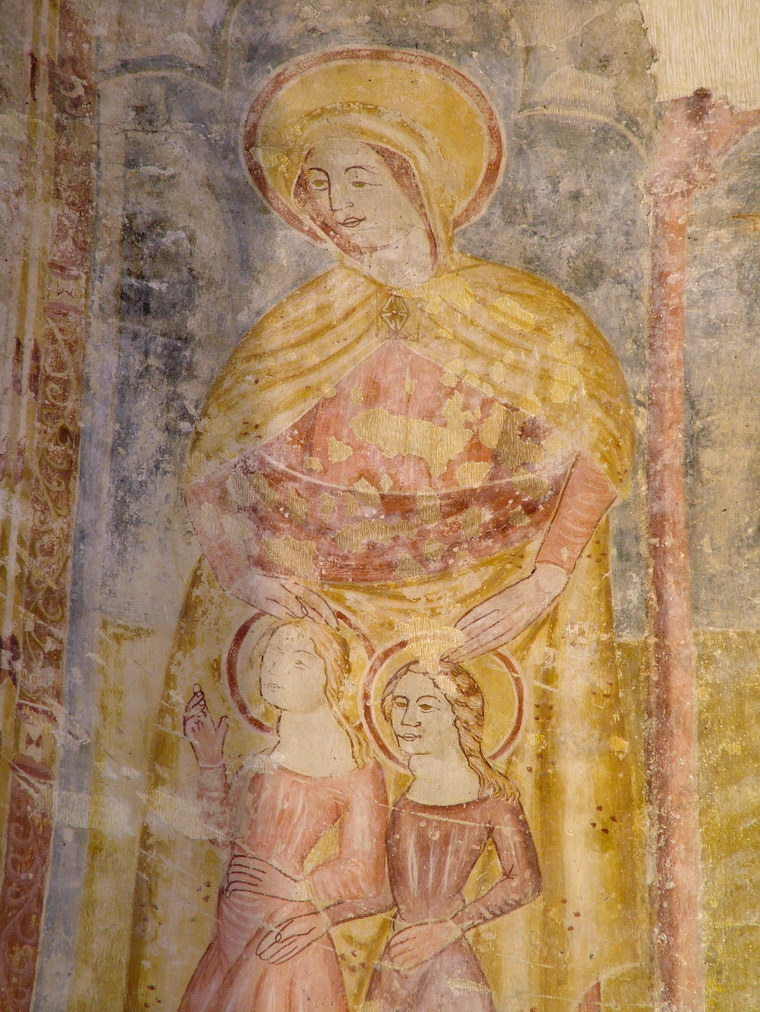
Fresco, inside, Rotunda

Roman Catholic Church

It was built in Neoromanesque art in 1910 after demolishing the old church in Baroque art.

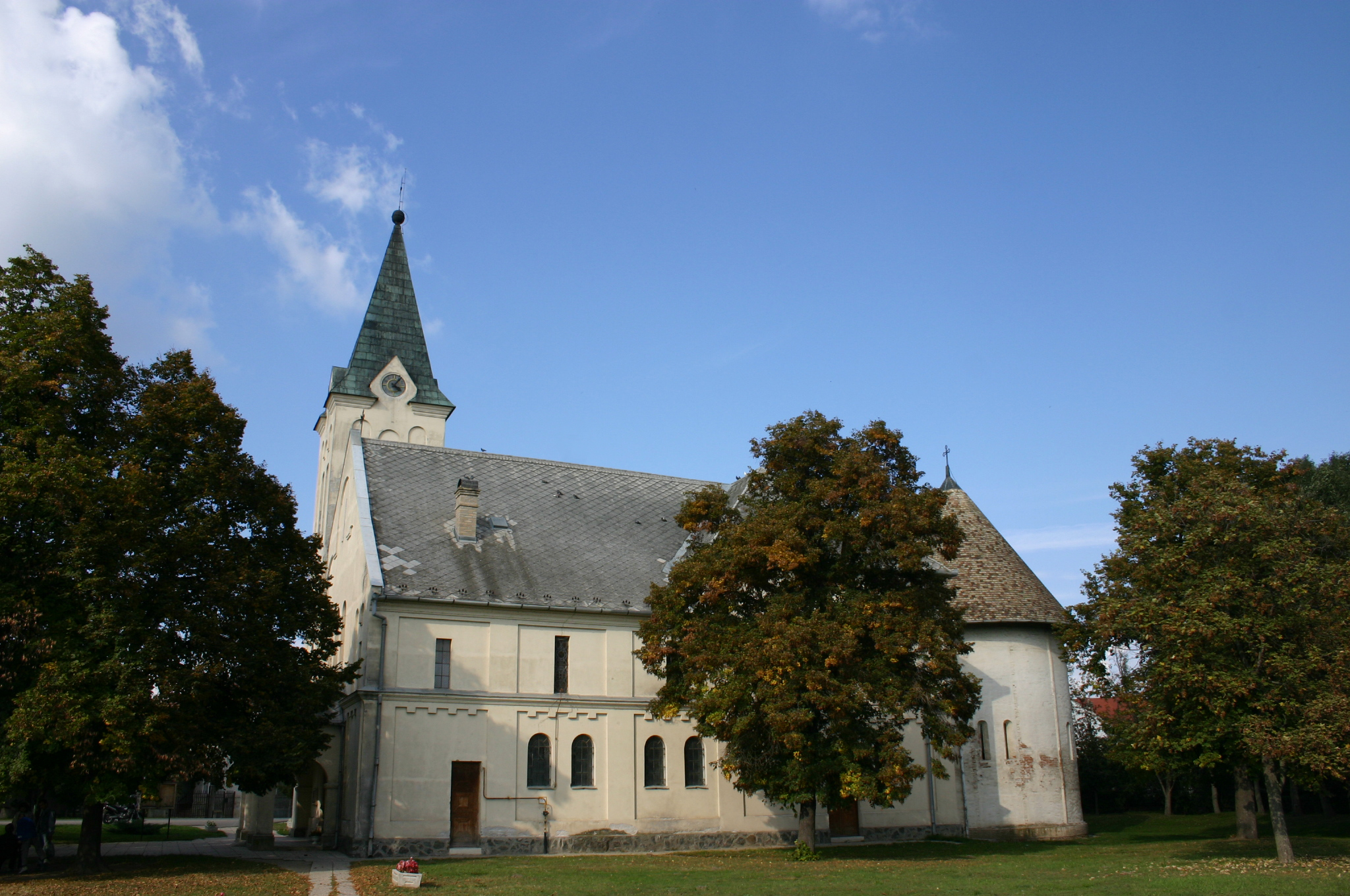
Roman Catholic Church, Kiszombor

=== Mansion ===
Rónay Castle (Móricz Zsigmond u. 1–3.)

It was built in Romantic art around 1858. There is a 3-storey rampart-like tower on the short west side. Its park and the original interior was destroyed during the Communism in Hungary.

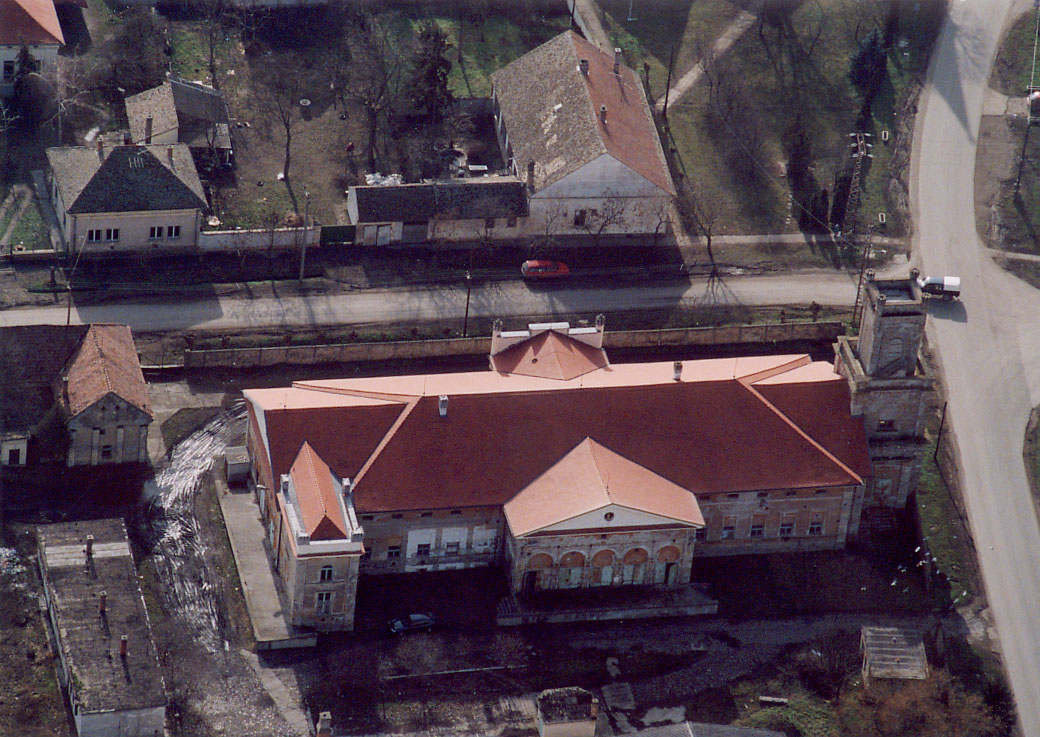
Rónay Castle, Kiszombor

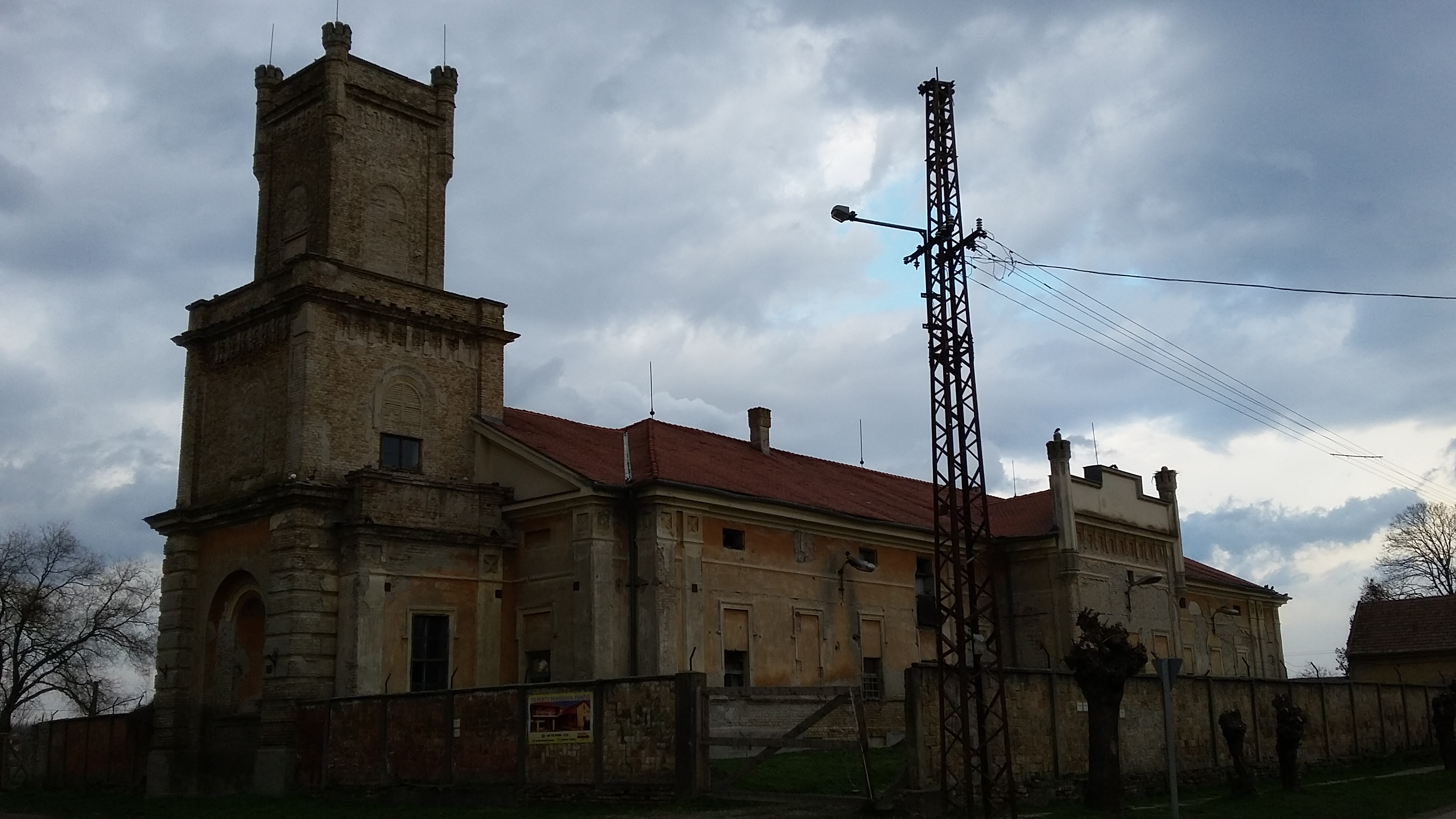
South side, Rónay Castle, Kiszombor

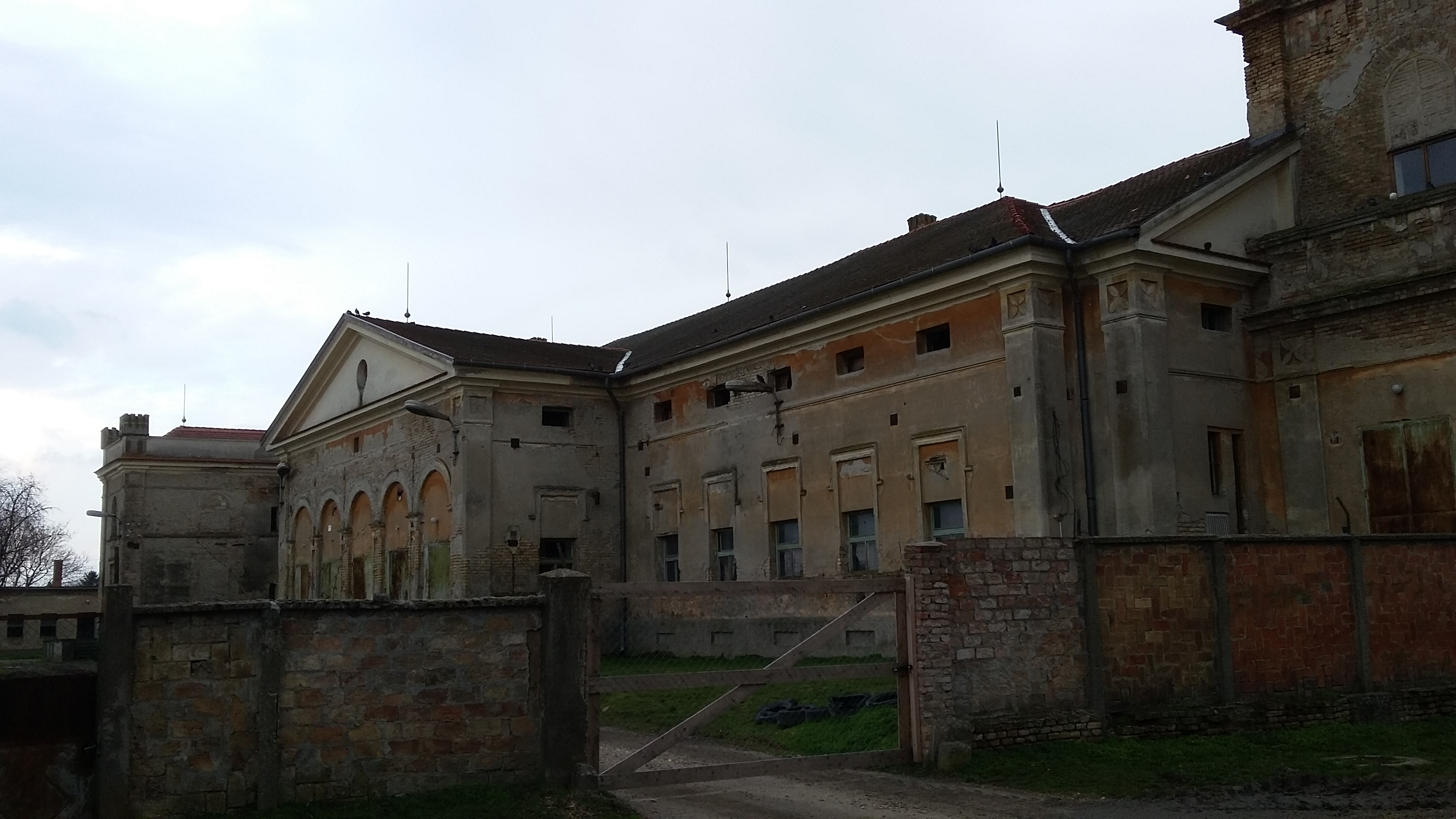
North side, Rónay Castle, Kiszombor

Rónay Mansion (Aladár Mansion) (Szegedi u. 1/B)

The mansion was built in the 1860s in Classical art. Its designer is unknown.

The building was restored in 2005, showing its old beauty, and operates as a restaurant under the name Rónay kúria.

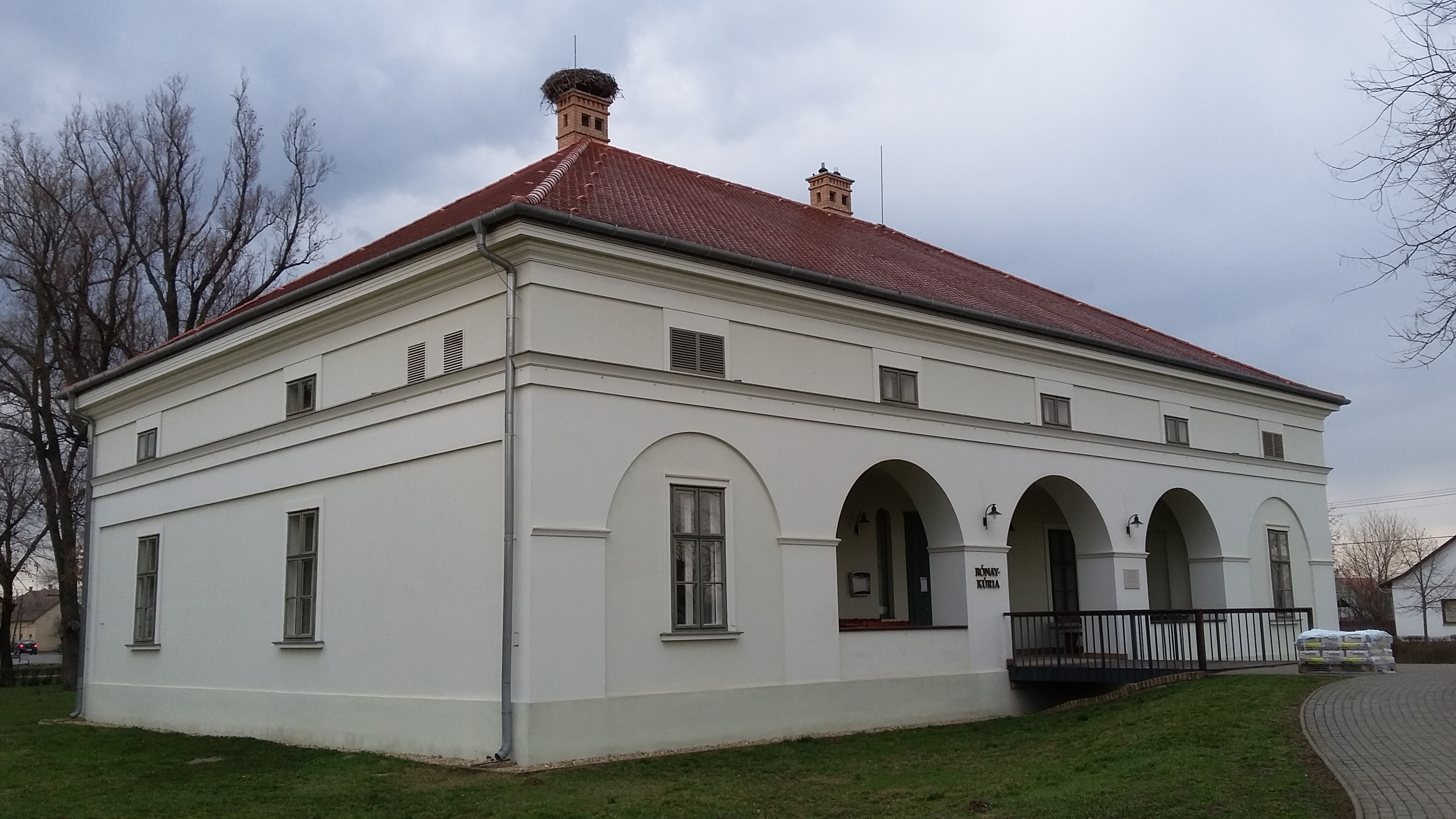
East side, Rónay Mansion, Rónay Aladár's Mansion (Aladár Mansion), Kiszombor

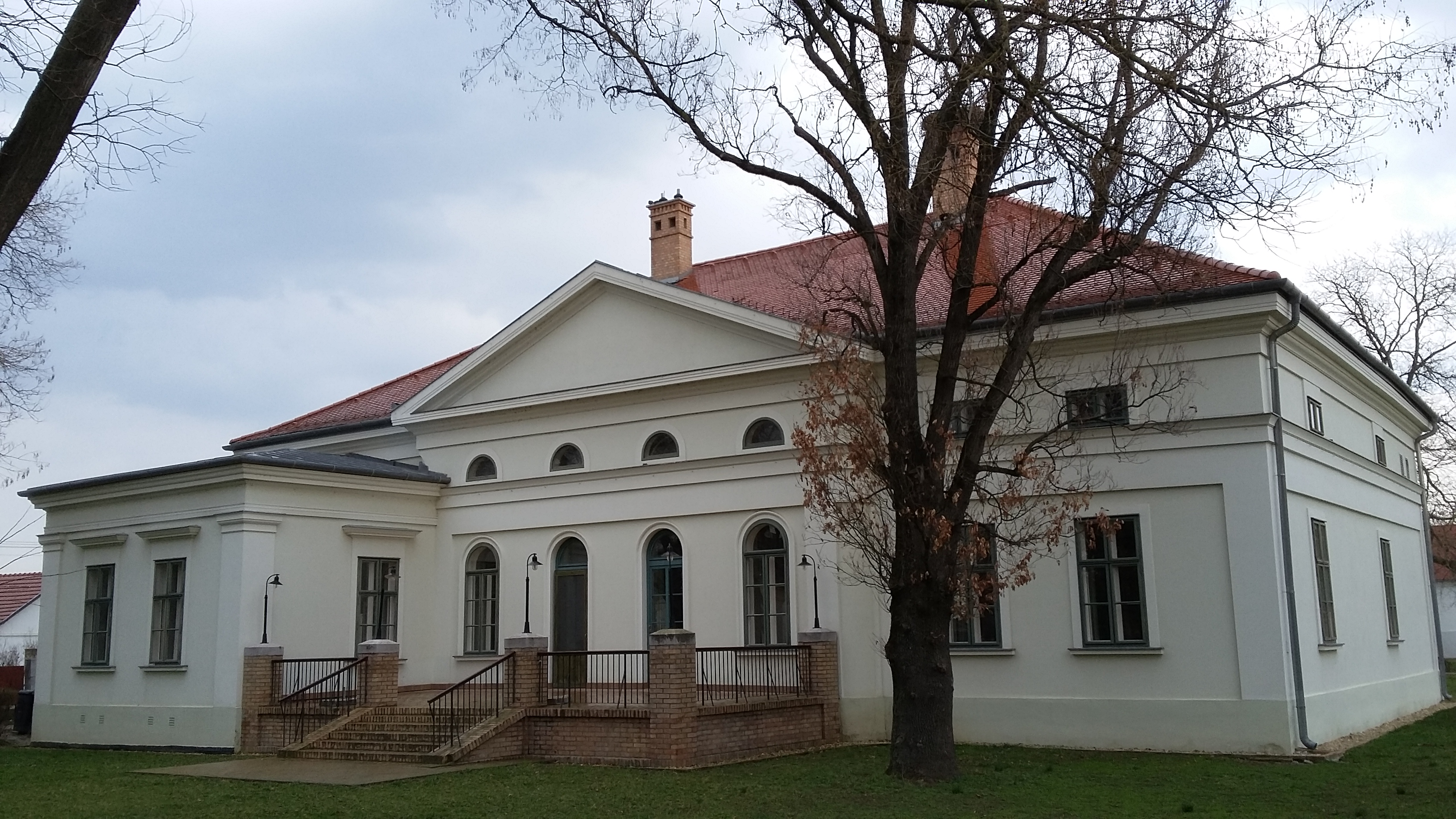
West side, Rónay Mansion, Rónay Aladár's Mansion (Aladár Mansion), Kiszombor

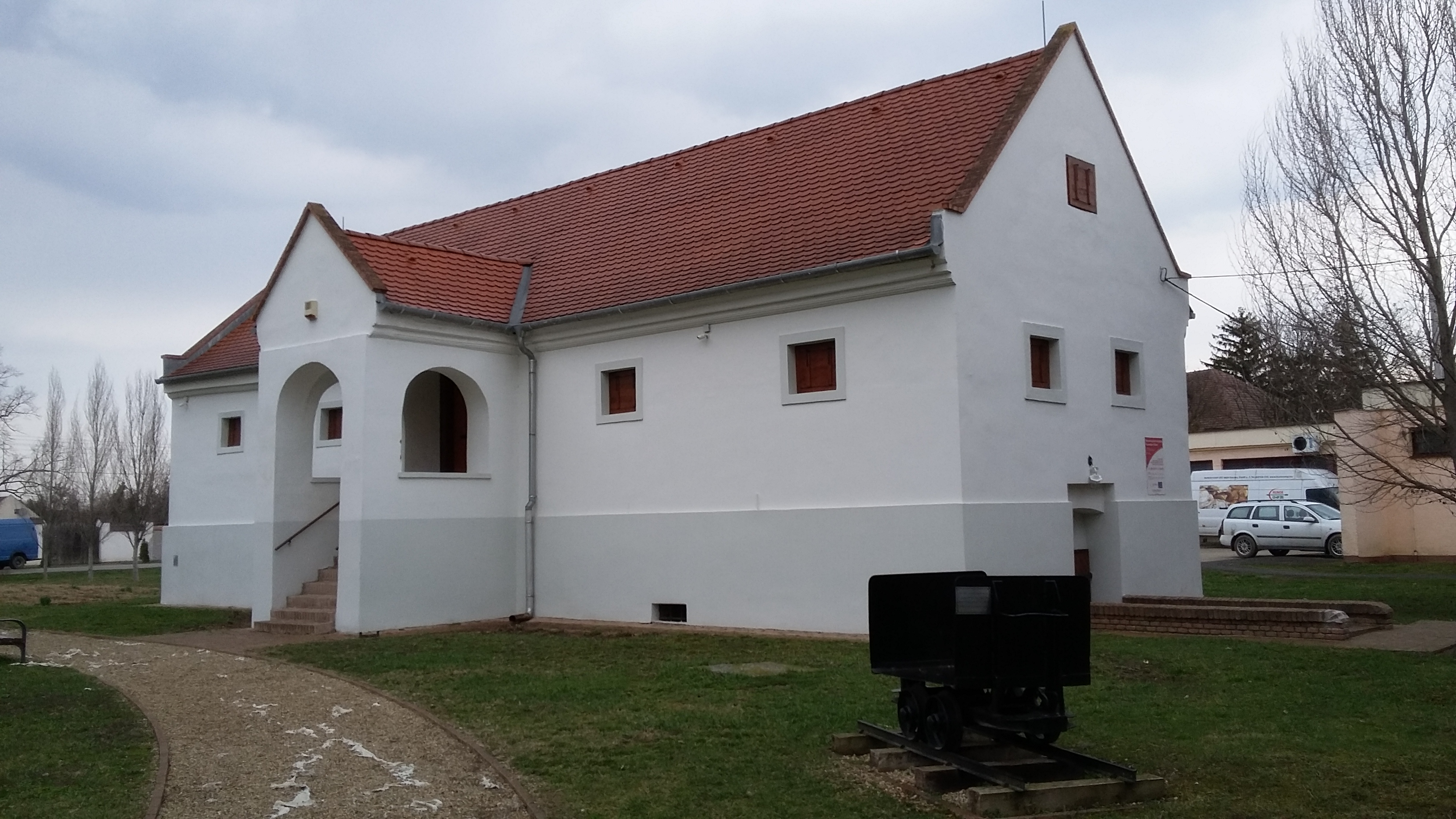
Rónay Granary, in front of the Aladár Mansion, Kiszombor

Rónay Mansion (Tibor Mansion) (Szent István tér 2.)

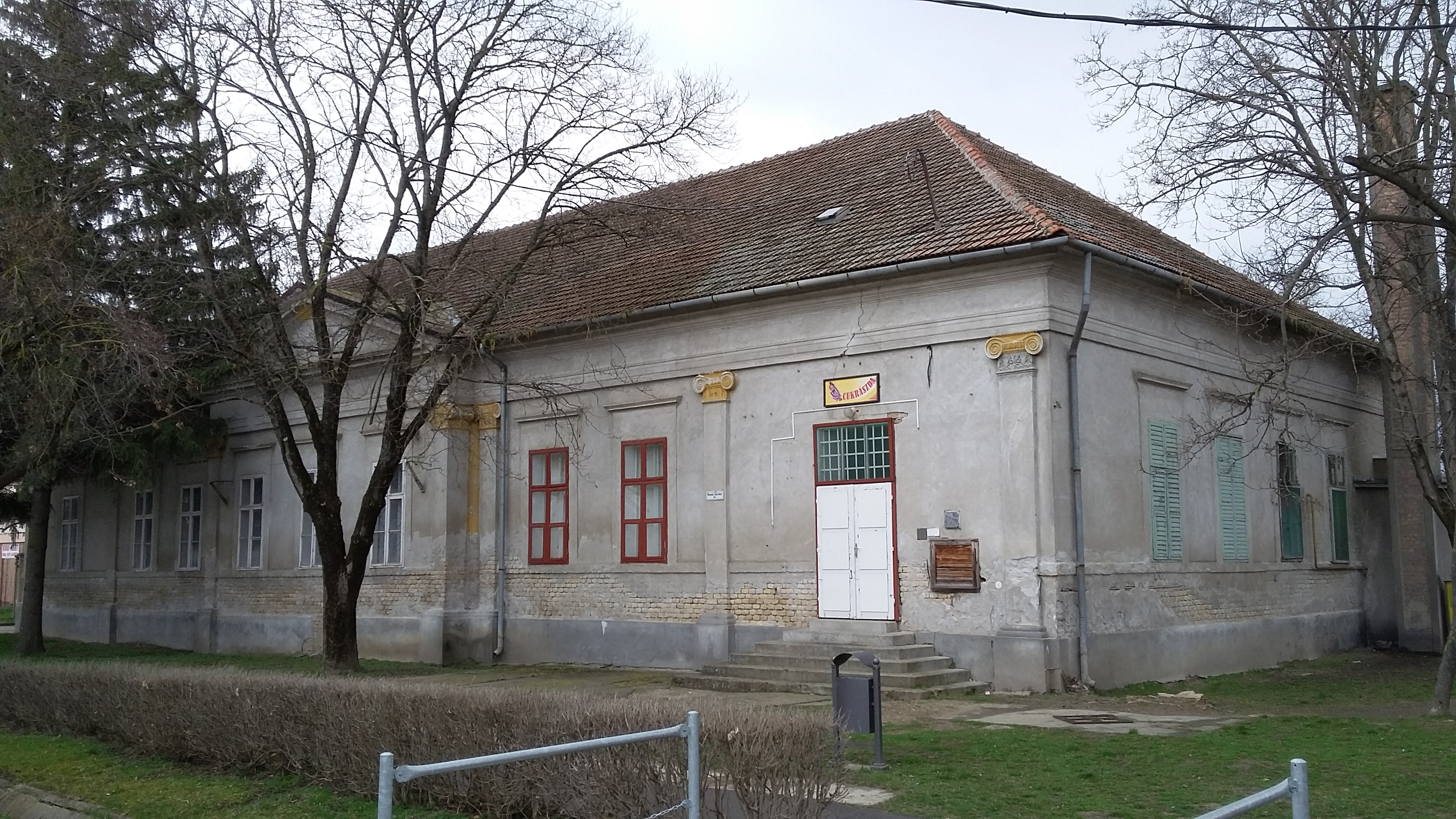
East side, Rónay Mansion, Rónay Tibor's Mansion (Tibor Mansion) Kiszombor

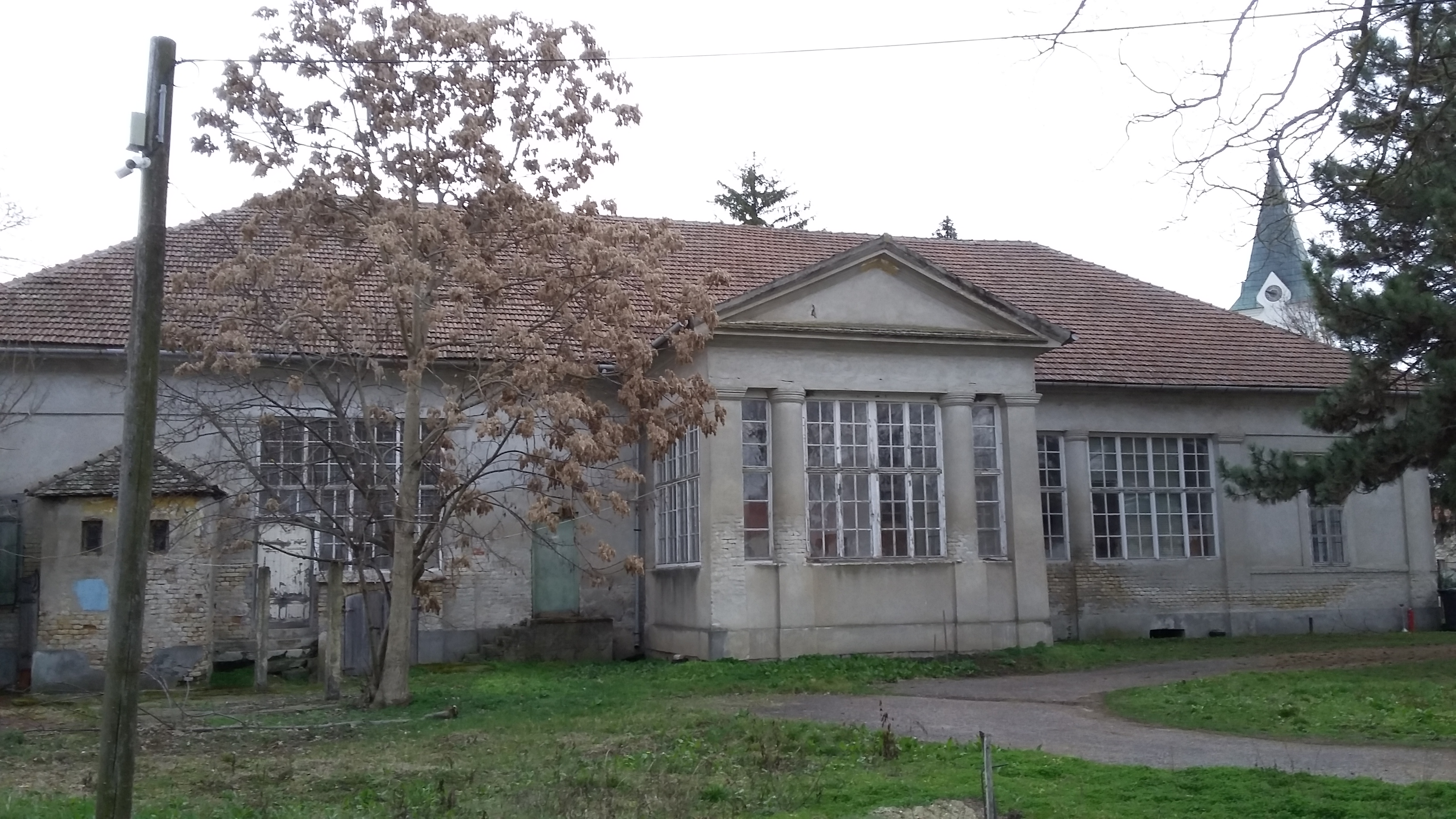
West side, Rónay Mansion, Rónay Tibor's Mansion (Tibor Mansion) Kiszombor

=== Granary ===
Granary with portico (Óbébai u. 2.)

The building in Classical art was built around 1835. This granary designed and constructed with style is unique in Hungary.

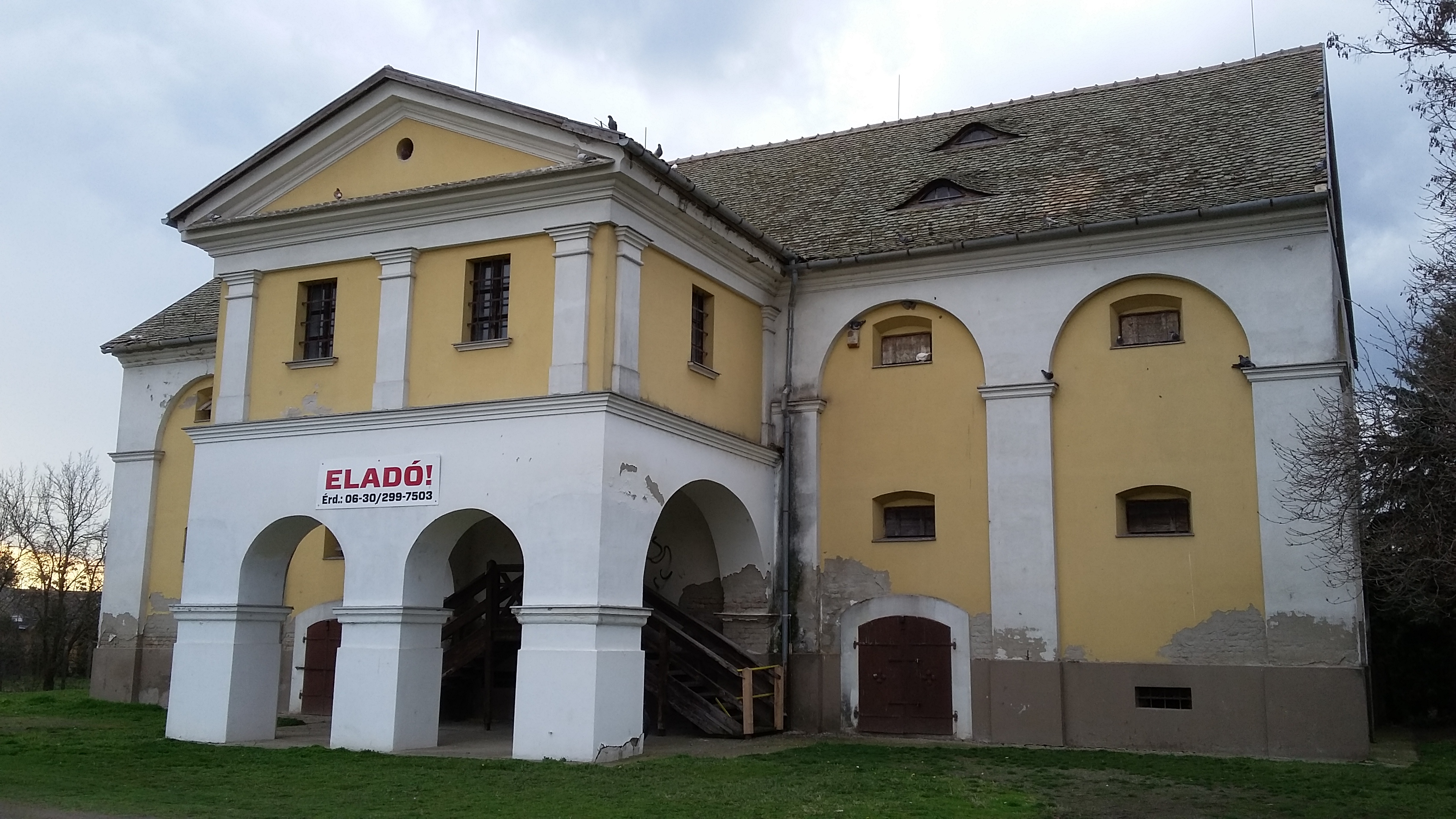
Multi-storey granary with portico, Kiszombor

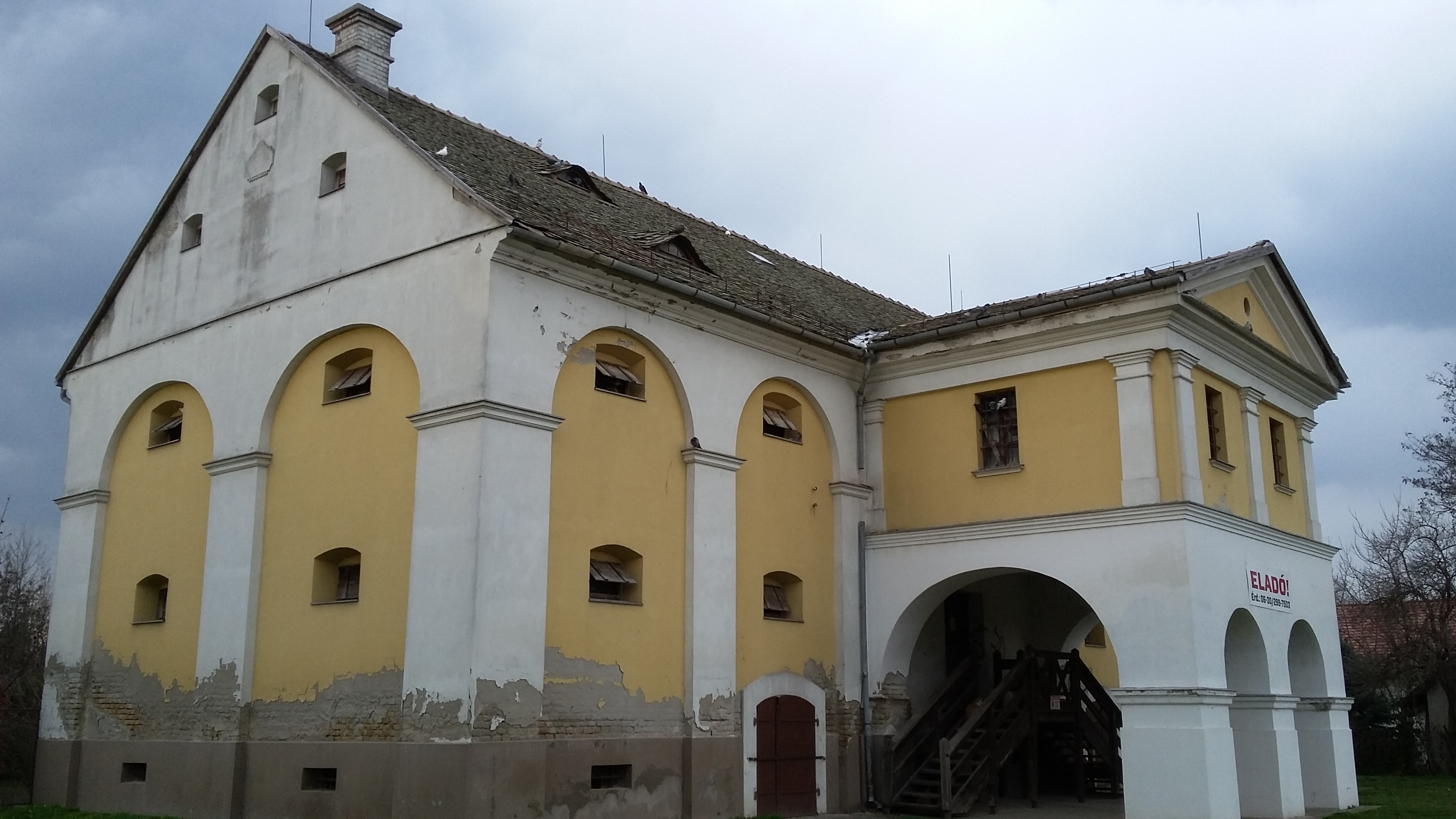
Multi-storey granary with portico, Kiszombor
