= Földeák =

Coordinates: 46°19′N 20°30′E

- Village
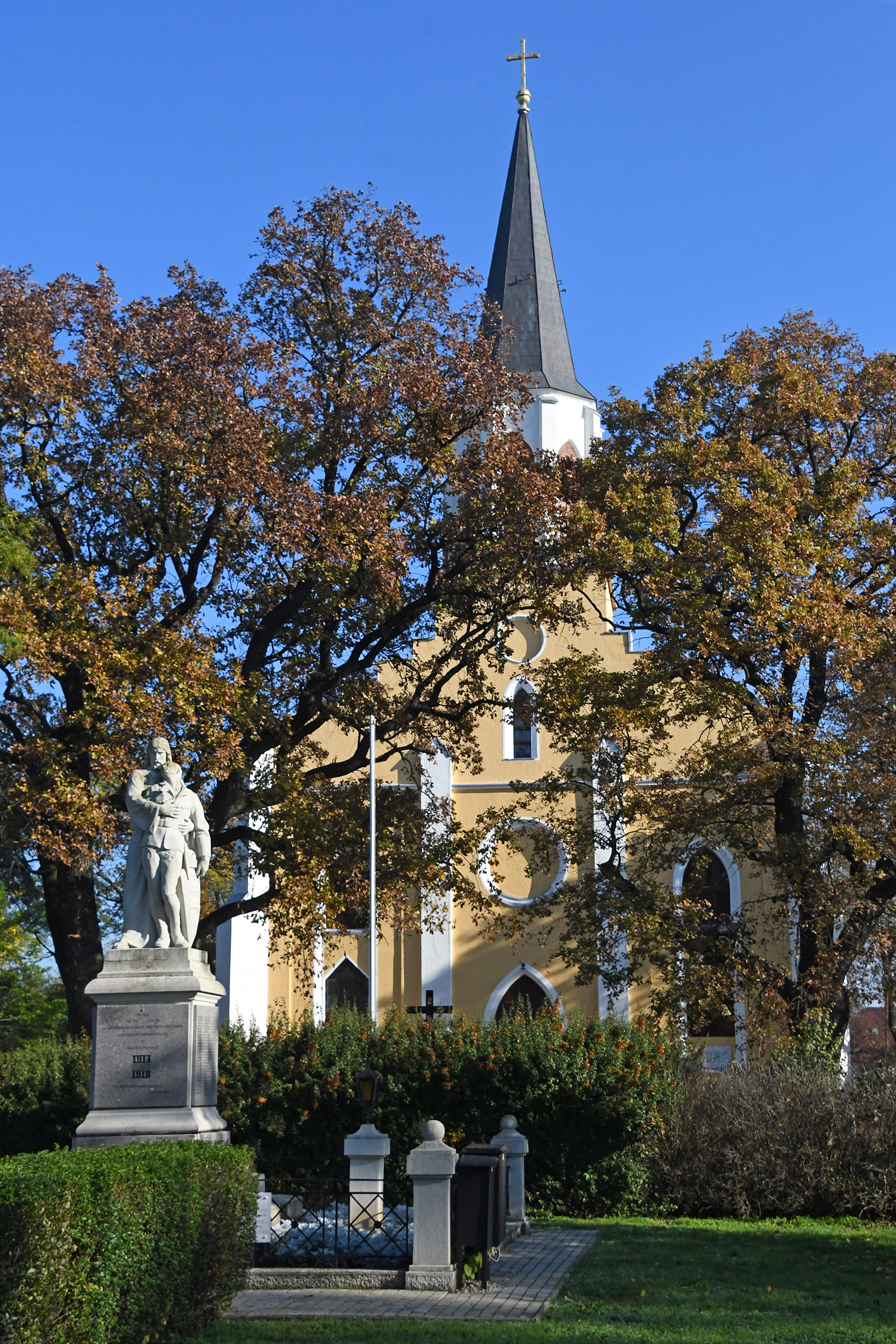
- Roman Catholic church with World War I memorial

- Coat of arms
- Interactive map of Földeák
- Country: Hungary
- County: Csongrád

Area
  - Total: 36.37 km^{2} (14.04 sq mi)

Population (2002)
  - Total: 3,318
  - Density: 91/km^{2} (240/sq mi)
- Time zone: UTC+1 (CET)
  - Summer (DST): UTC+2 (CEST)
- Postal code: 6922
- Area code: 62

Földeák is a village in Csongrád county, in the Southern Great Plain region of southern Hungary.

== Geography ==
The village covers an area of 36.37 km^{2} (14 sq mi) and has a population of 3318 people (2002).

== History ==
The village first appears in writing in 1332. The name of the village is likely rooted in the 11th and 12th centuries, and is thought to refer to a scribe (a "deák") named Philip ("Fil" or "Fülöp"). In the 15th century, a church was constructed dedicated to St. Martin of Tours. During the Ottoman occupation, the church was fortified, and during the Long Turkish War the village and its surroundings were wiped out.

In the first half of the 1600s the village was rebuilt relatively quickly, and by 1658 the village was issued its own seal. When the Ottomans were being chased out of Hungary, Imperial forces displaced the town's inhabitants in an effort to starve out Turkish forces occupying Gyula. The town wasn't repopulated until 1723, when families from Szeged and Makó moved in.

The Návay family, who moved into Földeák in 1739, constructed extensive tobacco farms on the village's outskirts in 1809. The area around these farms became increasingly developed, so the villagers began to refer to Földeák as "Óföldeák" meaning "Old-Földeák". Throughout the 19th century Óföldeák was repeatedly flooded by the Tisza and Maros rivers, completely destroying the settlement in 1845. As a result, the vast majority of the villagers permanently resettled into 'new' Földeák, by the Návay family's tobacco farms.

After 1845, the village began to develop rapidly. A church was constructed in romantic style on Saint Ladislaus square in 1857, the village was granted the status of market town, and a pharmacy and doctor's office opened. During the Interwar Period the village was home to a vibrant cultural scene, hosting various cultural organizations, libraries, and theatre productions.
