= Magyarcsanád =

Magyarcsanád Cenadul Unguresc, Чанад
- Village
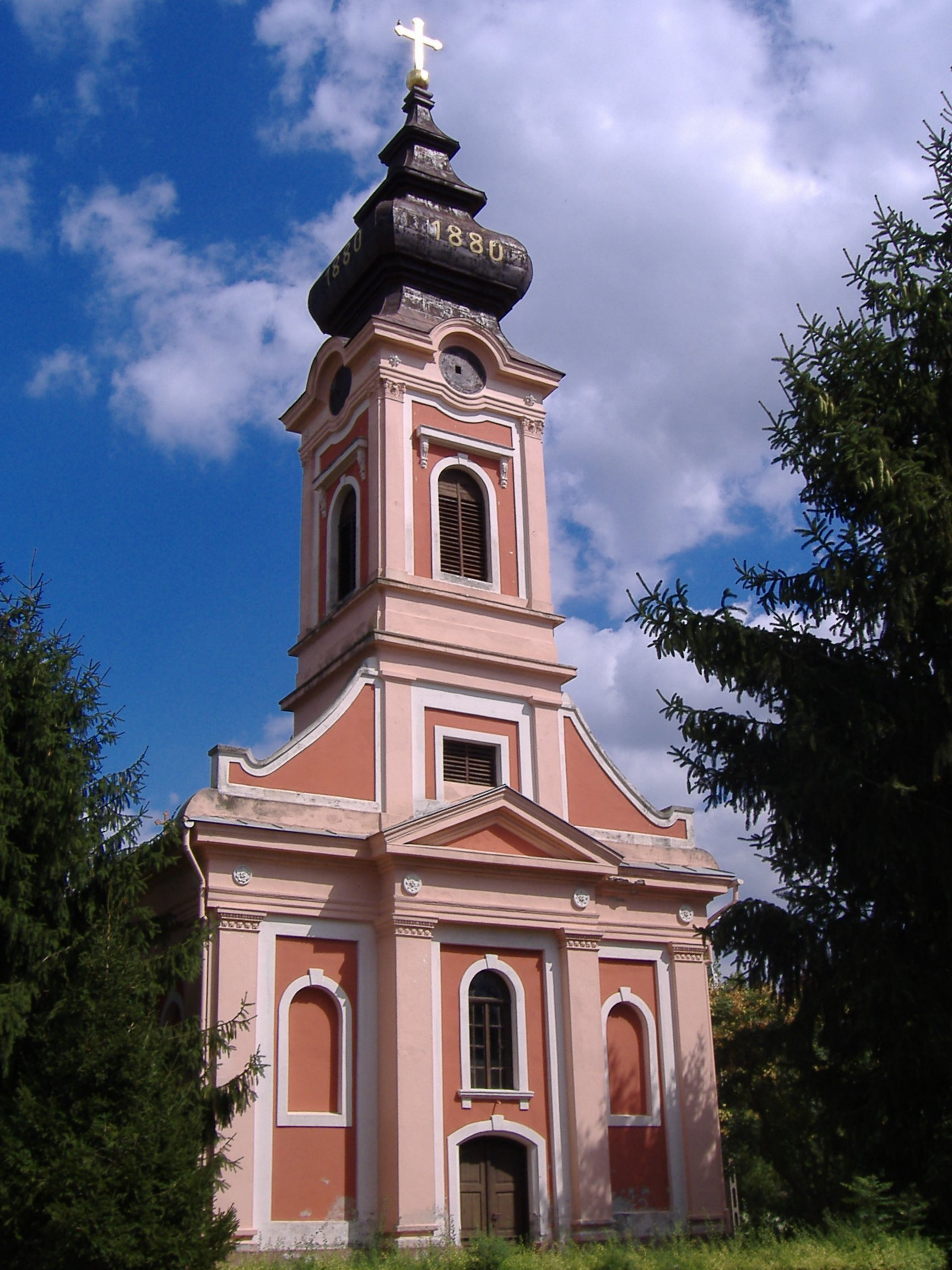
- Serbian Orthodox church in Magyarcsanád

- Coat of arms

- Location of Magyarcsanád in Hungary
- Coordinates: 46.167°N 20.617°E
- Country: Hungary
- Region: Southern Great Plain
- County: Csongrád
- Subregion: Makói
- Rank: Village

Area
  - Total: 48.19 km^{2} (18.61 sq mi)

Population (1 January 2008)
  - Total: 1,538
  - Density: 31.92/km^{2} (82.66/sq mi)
- Time zone: UTC+1 (CET)
  - Summer (DST): UTC+2 (CEST)
- Postal code: 6932
- Area code: +36 62
- KSH code: 05962
- Website: www.magyarcsanad.hu

Magyarcsanád (Romanian: Cenadul Unguresc; Serbian: Чанад, romanized: Čanad) is a multi-ethnic village located in Csongrád-Csanád County, southeastern Hungary, near the Mureș (Maros) River. The river Maros forms the border between southern Hungary and Romania.

The village has an outskirt called Bökény directly near the Maros. Here is a tumulus (kunhalom) in which archeological artifacts were found.

Magyarcsanád has a partner-settlement, Comloșu Mare, in Timiș County, Romania.

An old stone cross was erected near Magyarcsanád in the Middle Ages. The cross still stands.

There is a small isle called 'Senki szigete' (English: No Man's Isle) some kilometers eastward from Magyarcsanád on the border river Maros. The isle is inhabited by Phalacrocoracidae (Phalacrocorax carbo).

== Demographics ==
As of 2022, the population is 78% Hungarian, 9.8% Romanian, 9.1% Gypsy, and 1.7% Serb. Magyarcsanád has four churches: a Roman Catholic, a Calvinist, a Serbian Orthodox, and a Romanian Orthodox one.
