= Kövegy =

Coordinates: 46°13′N 20°41′E

- Village
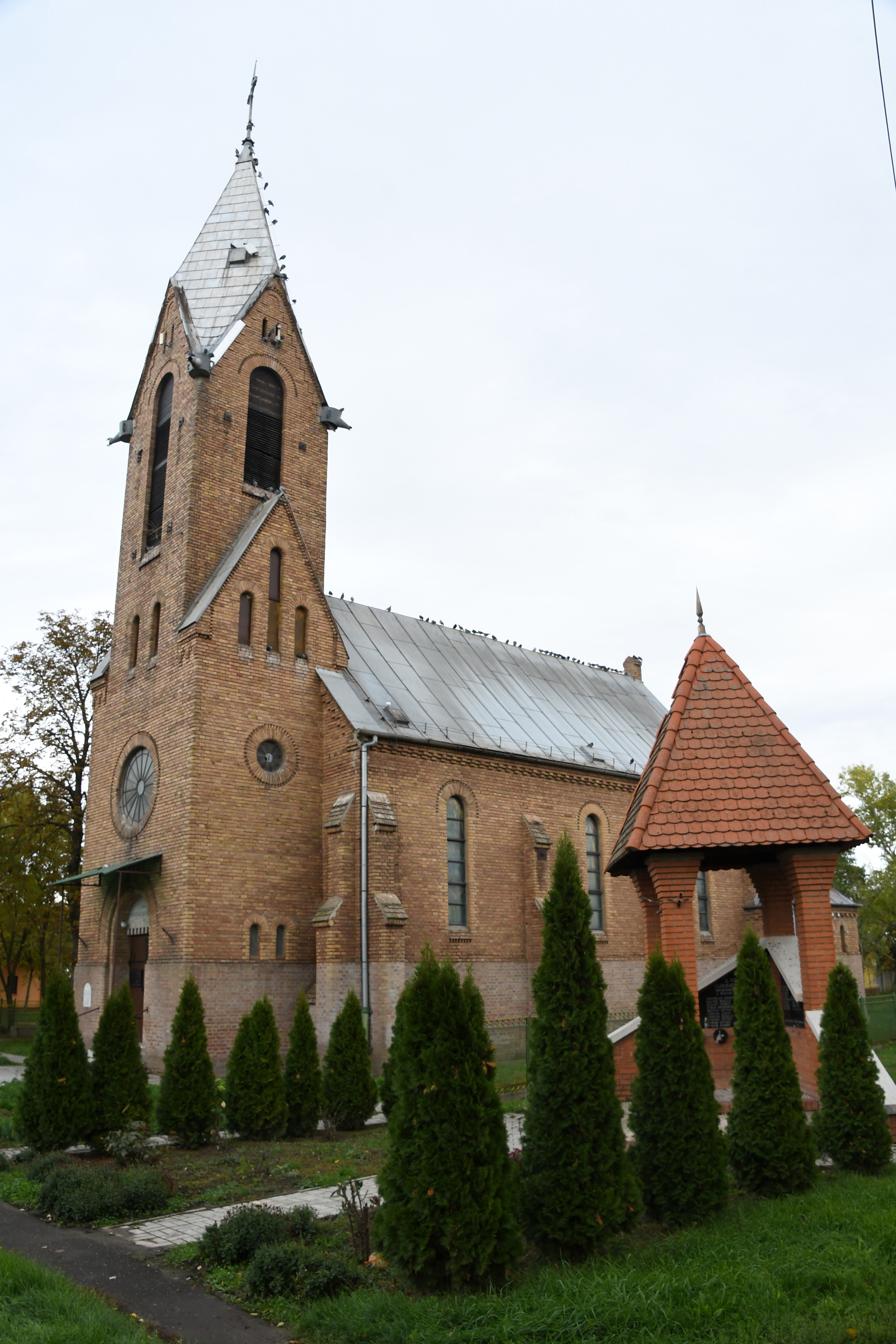
- Roman Catholic church in Kövegy

- Coat of arms
- Interactive map of Kövegy
- Country: Hungary
- County: Csongrád

Area
  - Total: 9.71 km^{2} (3.75 sq mi)

Population (2015)
  - Total: 362
  - Density: 37.3/km^{2} (97/sq mi)
- Time zone: UTC+1 (CET)
  - Summer (DST): UTC+2 (CEST)
- Postal code: 6912
- Area code: 62

Kövegy is a village in Csongrád county, in the Southern Great Plain region of southern Hungary.

== Geography ==
It covers an area of 9.71 km^{2} (4 sq mi) and has a population of 362 people (2015).

== History ==
In 1764 it was still mentioned as a wasteland, in 1843 more than 120 families of Catholic tobacco growers from the surrounding settlements settled here. It belonged to Csanádpalota until 1882, then it became an independent settlement. From 1973 to 1990, it was a village with a joint council with Csanádpalota. It has been an independent settlement since 1990.
