= Nagylak =

- Village
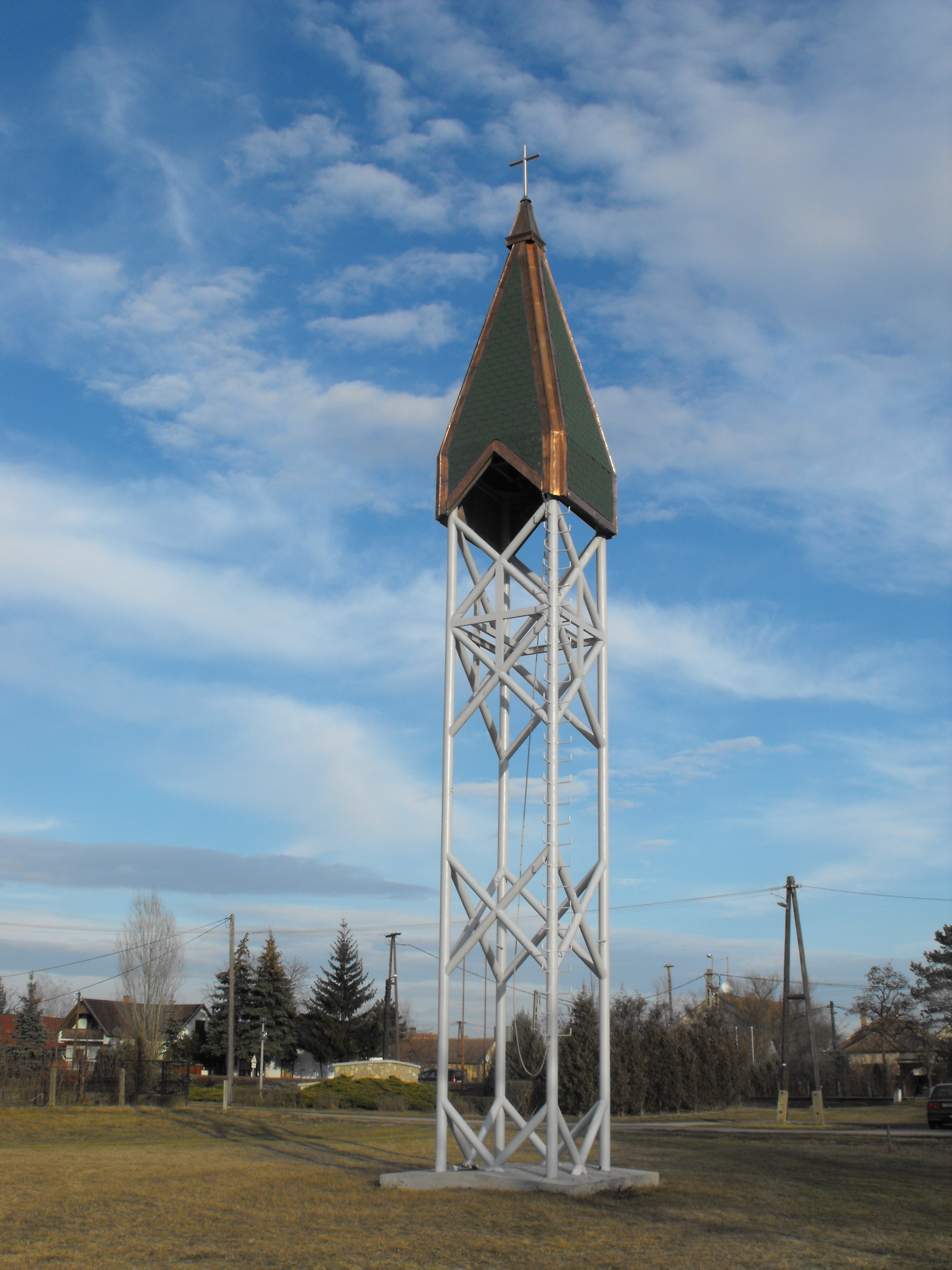
- Bell tower in Nagylak

- Coat of arms

- Location within Csongrád County Location within Hungary
- Coordinates: 46°10′N 20°43′E
- Country: Hungary
- County: Csongrád-Csanád
- District: Makó District

Area
  - Total: 4.70 km^{2} (1.81 sq mi)

Population (2023)
  - Total: 365 ▼
  - Density: 77.7/km^{2} (201/sq mi)
- Time zone: UTC+1 (CET)
  - Summer (DST): UTC+2 (CEST)
- Postal code: 6933
- Area code: 62

Nagylak (Romanian: Nădlac or Nădlacul Unguresc) is a village in Csongrád-Csanád County, in the Southern Great Plain region of southern Hungary.

== Geography ==
It covers an area of 4.7 km^{2} (2 sq mi) and in 2023 had a population of 365.

== Demographics ==
As of 2022 83.2% were of Hungarian nationality, 13.7% of Romanian nationality, 1.3% Romani, 1.1% Slovak, 0.5% German, 0.5% Bulgarian, 0.3% Serbian.
