= Királyhegyes =

Coordinates: 46°16′N 20°37′E

- Interactive map of Királyhegyes
- Country: Hungary
- County: Csongrád

Area
  - Total: 29.80 km^{2} (11.51 sq mi)

Population (2015)
  - Total: 626
  - Density: 21/km^{2} (54/sq mi)
- Time zone: UTC+1 (CET)
  - Summer (DST): UTC+2 (CEST)
- Postal code: 6911
- Area code: 62

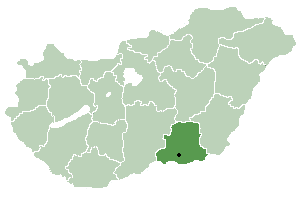
Location of Csongrád County in Hungary

Királyhegyes is a village in Csongrád county, in the Southern Great Plain region of southern Hungary.

== Geography ==
It covers an area of 29.8 km^{2} (12 sq mi) and has a population of 626 people (2015).
