= Óföldeák =

Coordinates: 46°18′N 20°27′E

- Village
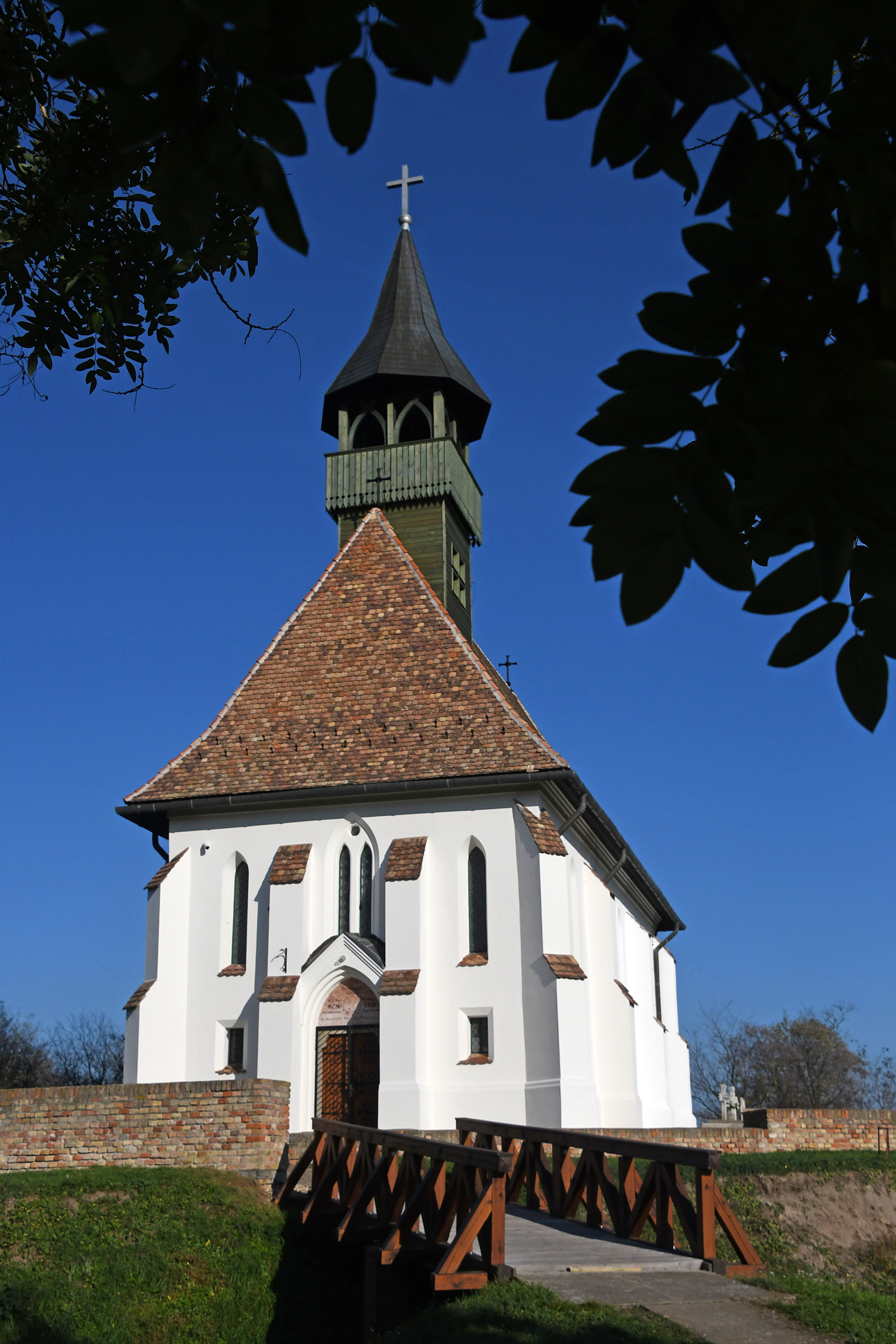
- Medieval Roman Catholic Church in Óföldeák

- Coat of arms
- Interactive map of Óföldeák
- Country: Hungary
- County: Csongrád

Government
  - Mayor: Simonné Sinkó Erika (Ind.)

Area
  - Total: 35.09 km^{2} (13.55 sq mi)

Population (2022)
  - Total: 465
  - Density: 13.3/km^{2} (34.3/sq mi)
- Time zone: UTC+1 (CET)
  - Summer (DST): UTC+2 (CEST)
- Postal code: 6923
- Area code: 62

Óföldeák is a village in Csongrád county, in the Southern Great Plain region of southern Hungary.

== Geography ==
It covers an area of 35.09 km^{2} (14 sq mi) and has a population of 465 people (2022).

== Gallery ==
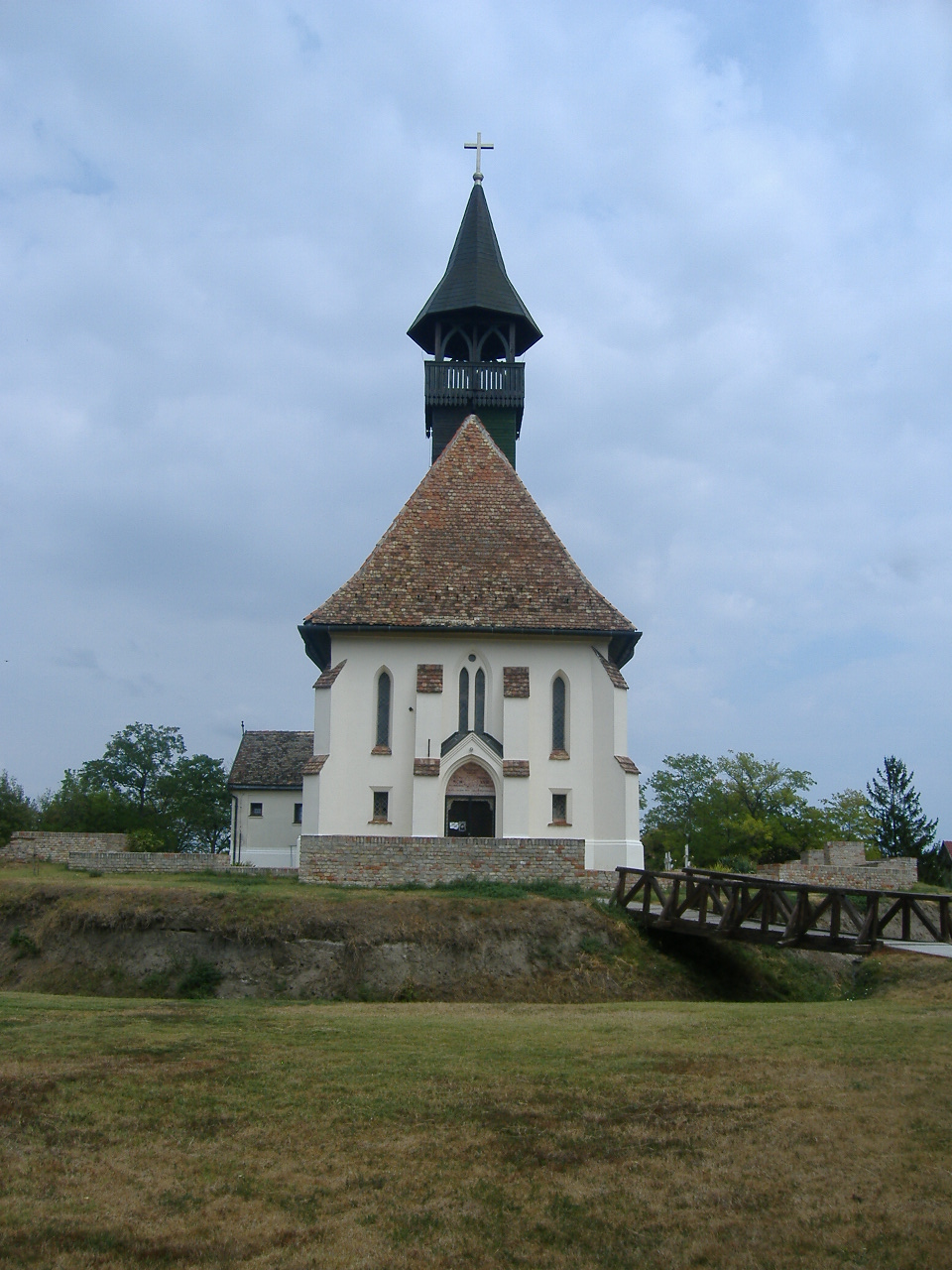

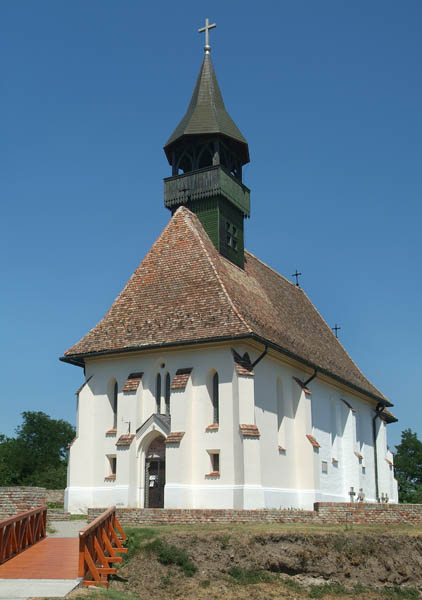

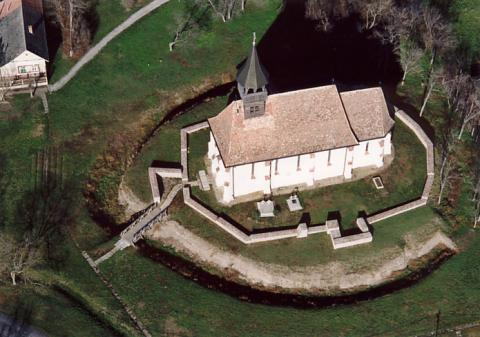

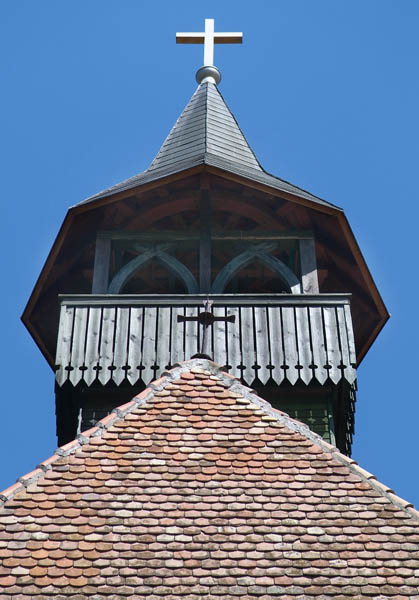

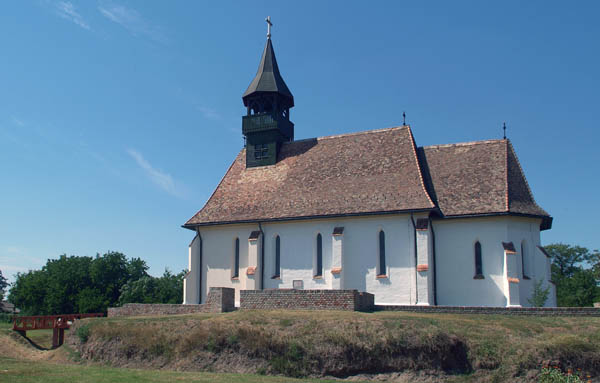

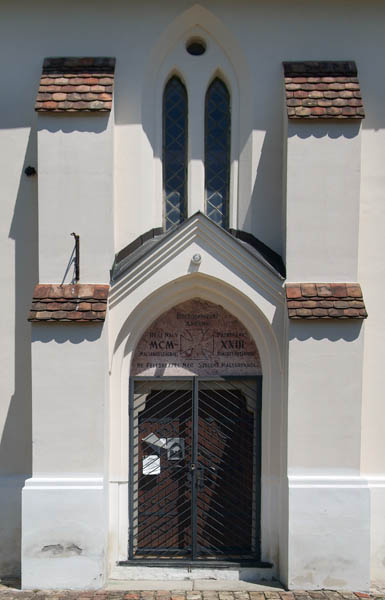
