= Kecskemét District =

Coordinates: 46.8833°N 19.7000°E

Kecskemét District Kecskeméti járás
- Districts of Hungary
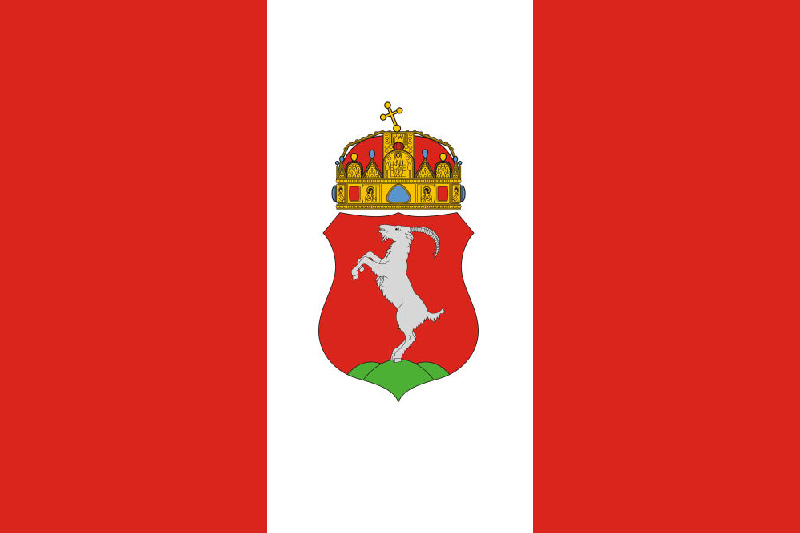
- Flag Coat of arms

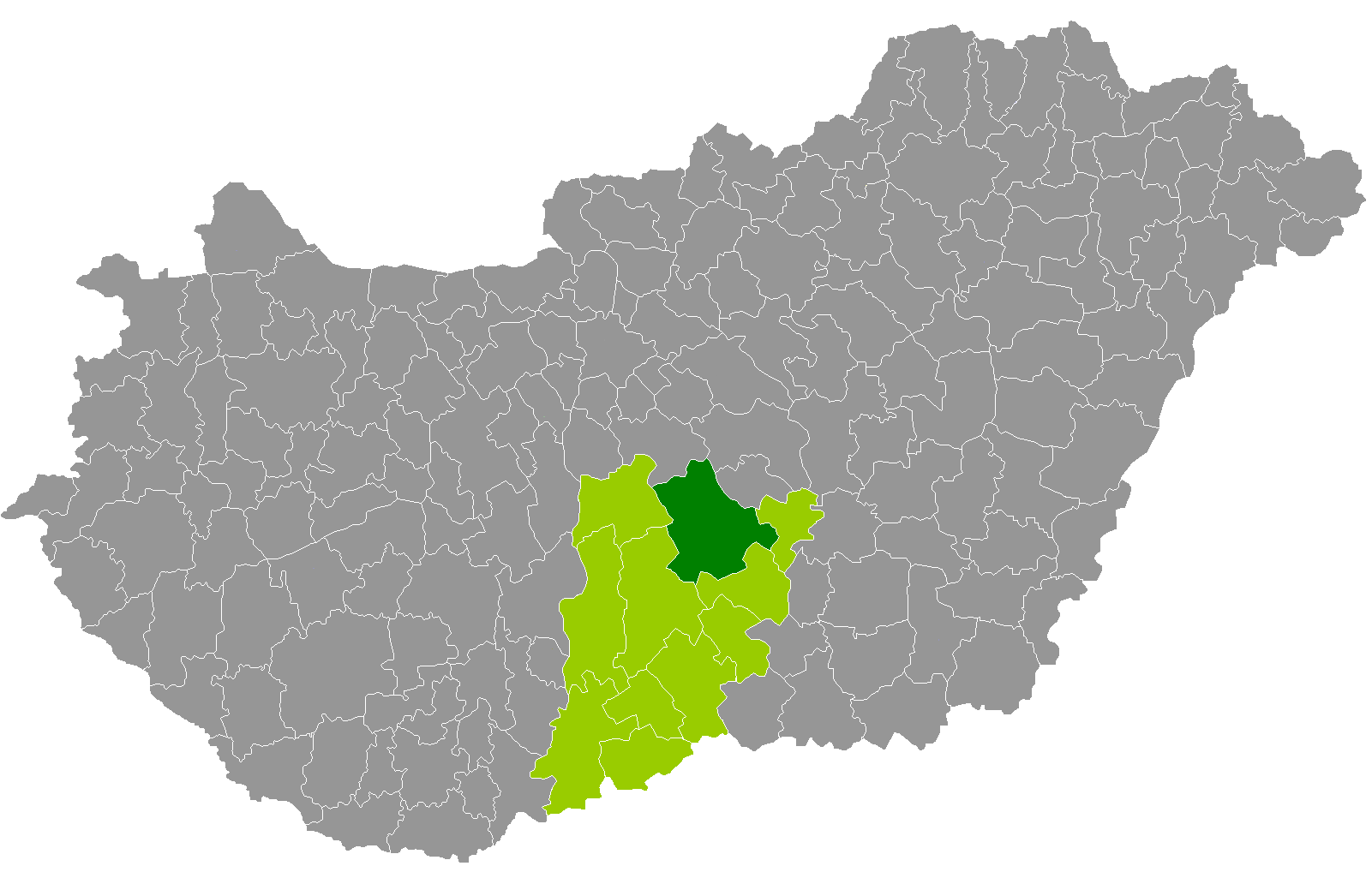
- Kecskemét District within Hungary and Bács-Kiskun County.
- Country: Hungary
- County: Bács-Kiskun
- District seat: Kecskemét

Area
  - Total: 1,212.21 km^{2} (468.04 sq mi)
  - Rank: 1st in Bács-Kiskun

Population (2011 census)
  - Total: 155,481
  - Rank: 1st in Bács-Kiskun
  - Density: 128/km^{2} (330/sq mi)

Kecskemét (Hungarian: Kecskeméti járás) is a district in northern part of Bács-Kiskun County. Kecskemét is also the name of the town where the district seat is found. The district is located in the Southern Great Plain Statistical Region.

== Geography ==
Kecskemét District borders with Dabas District and Cegléd District (Pest County) to the north, Nagykőrös District (Pest County) to the northeast, Tiszakécske District to the east, Kiskunfélegyháza District to the south, Kiskőrös District and Kunszentmiklós District to the west. The number of the inhabited places in Kecskemét District is 16.

== Municipalities ==
The district has 1 urban county, 2 towns and 13 villages. (ordered by population, as of 1 January 2014)

- Ágasegyháza (1,892)
- Ballószög (3,366)
- Felsőlajos (858)
- Fülöpháza (845)
- Fülöpjakab (1,161)
- Helvécia (4,406)
- Jakabszállás (2,615)
- **Kecskemét** (112,071) – district and county seat
- **Kerekegyháza** (6,330)
- Kunbaracs (615)
- Kunszállás (1,661)
- Ladánybene (1,574)
- **Lajosmizse** (11,228)
- Nyárlőrinc (2,323)
- Orgovány (3,372)
- Városföld (2,158)

The bolded municipalities are cities.

== Demographics ==
Religion in Kecskemét District (2011 census)
1. Catholic Church (45.0%)
2. Greek Catholicism (0.30%)
3. Calvinism (10.2%)
4. Lutheranism (1.00%)
5. Other religions (1.60%)
6. Non-religious (14.0%)
7. Atheists (1.20%)
8. Undeclared (26.7%)

In 2011, it had a population of 155,481 and the population density was 128/km^{2}.

| Year | County population | Change |
|---|---|---|
| 2011 | 155,481 | n/a |

=== Ethnicity ===
Besides the Hungarian majority, the main minorities are the German and Roma (approx. 1,750), Romanian (700), Croat (150), Russian and Serb (200), Slovak, Bulgarian and Ukrainian (100).

Total population (2011 census): 155,481
Ethnic groups (2011 census): Identified themselves: 141,203 persons:

- Hungarians: 134,683 (95.38%)
- Germans: 1,748 (1.24%)
- Gypsies: 1,734 (1.23%)
- Others and indefinable: 3,038 (2.15%)

Approx. 14,000 persons in Kecskemét District did not declare their ethnic group at the 2011 census.

=== Religion ===
Religious adherence in the county according to 2011 census:

- Catholic – 70,482 (Roman Catholic – 70,032; Greek Catholic – 424);
- Reformed – 15,788;
- Evangelical – 1,575;
- other religions – 2,494;
- Non-religious – 21,788;
- Atheism – 1,887;
- Undeclared – 41,467.

== Gallery ==
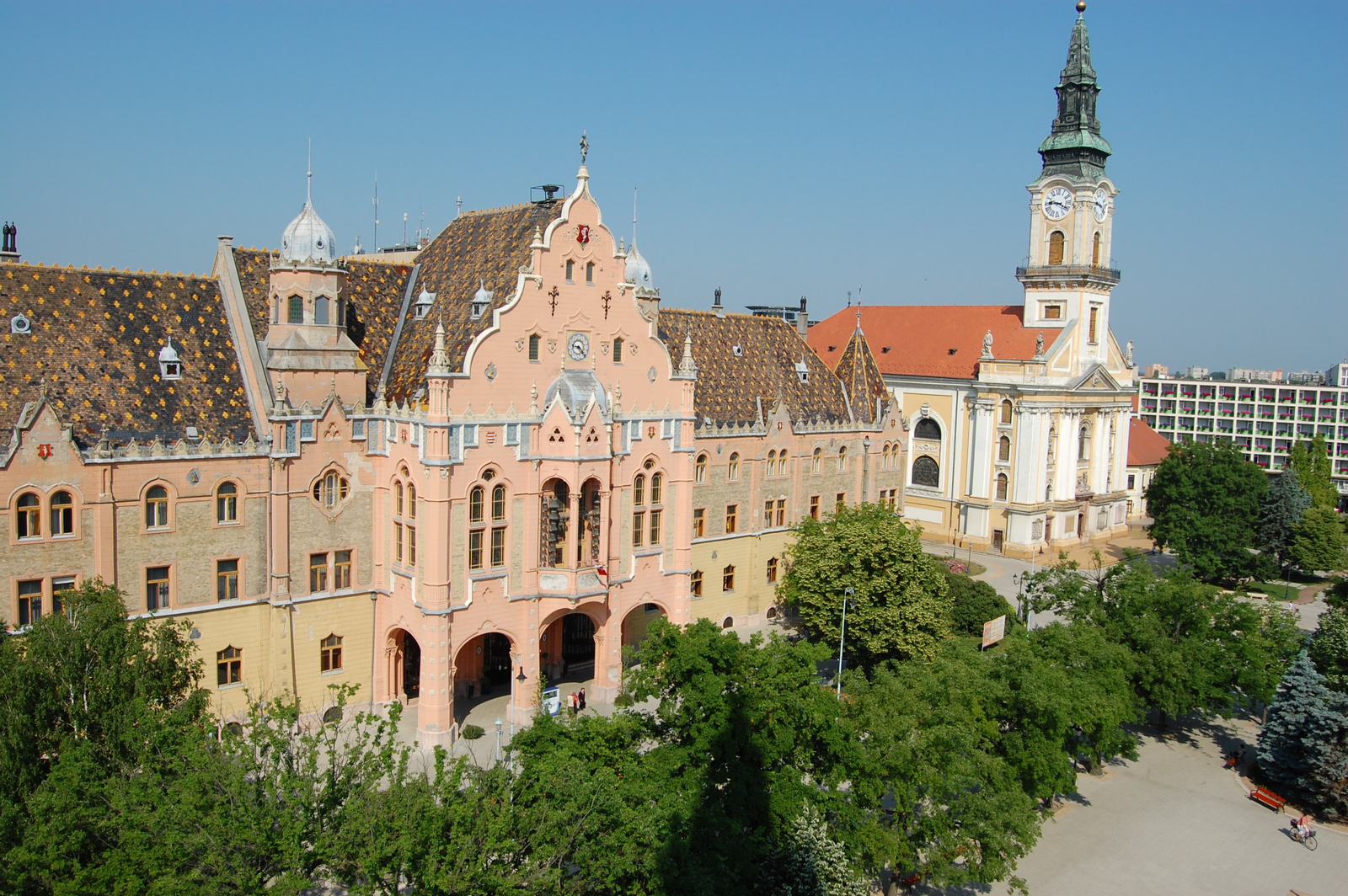
Downtown of Kecskemét

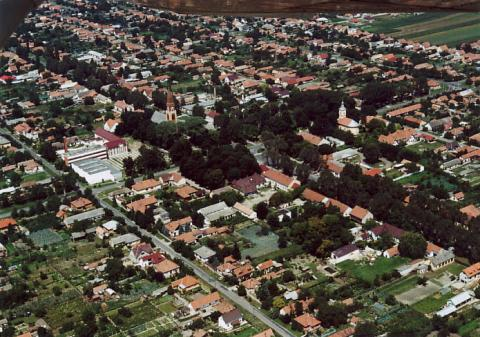
Aerial view of Kerekegyháza

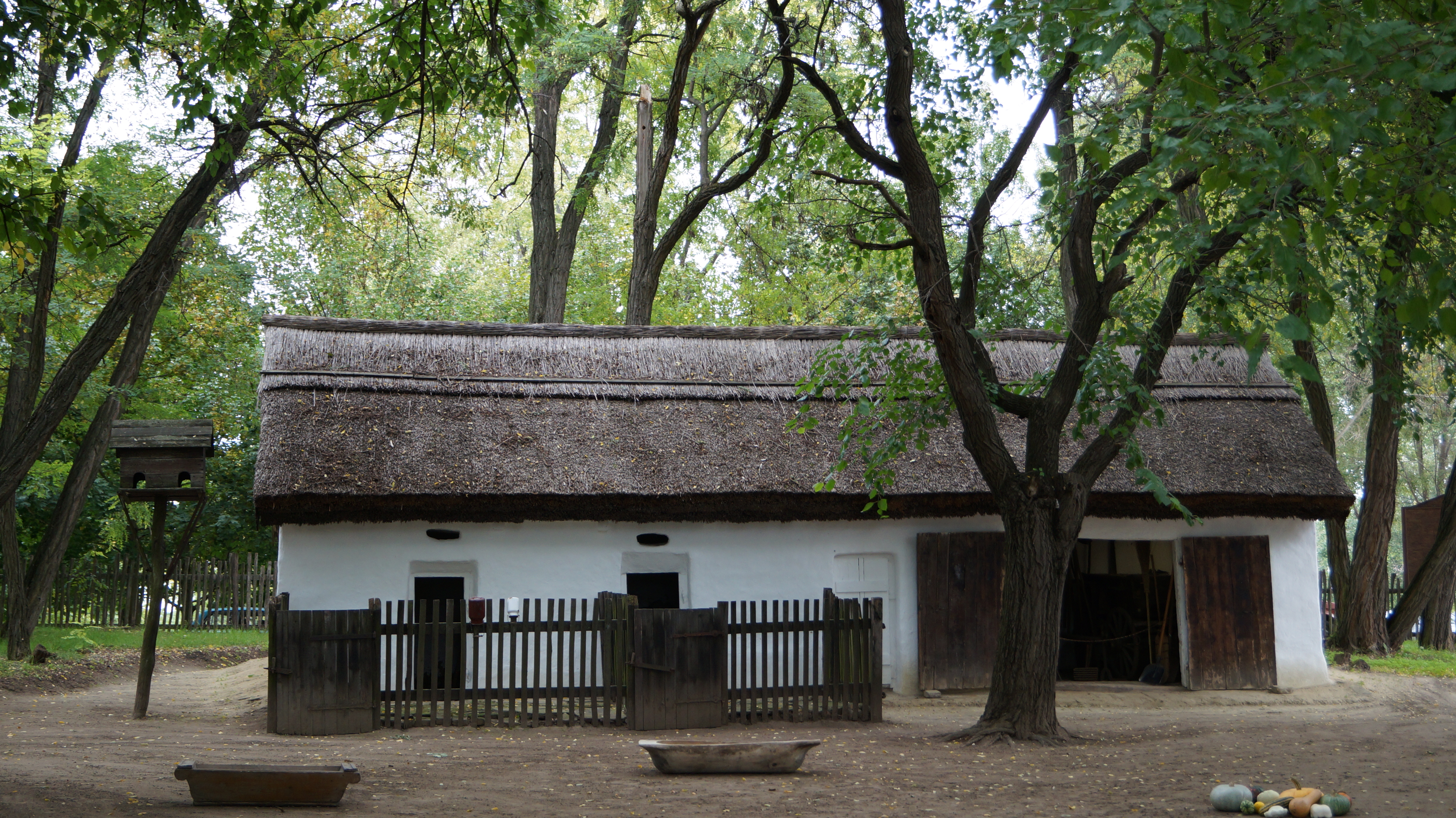
Farm Museum in Lajosmizse

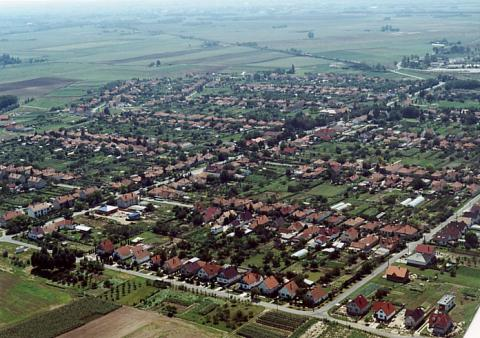
Aerial view of Városföld

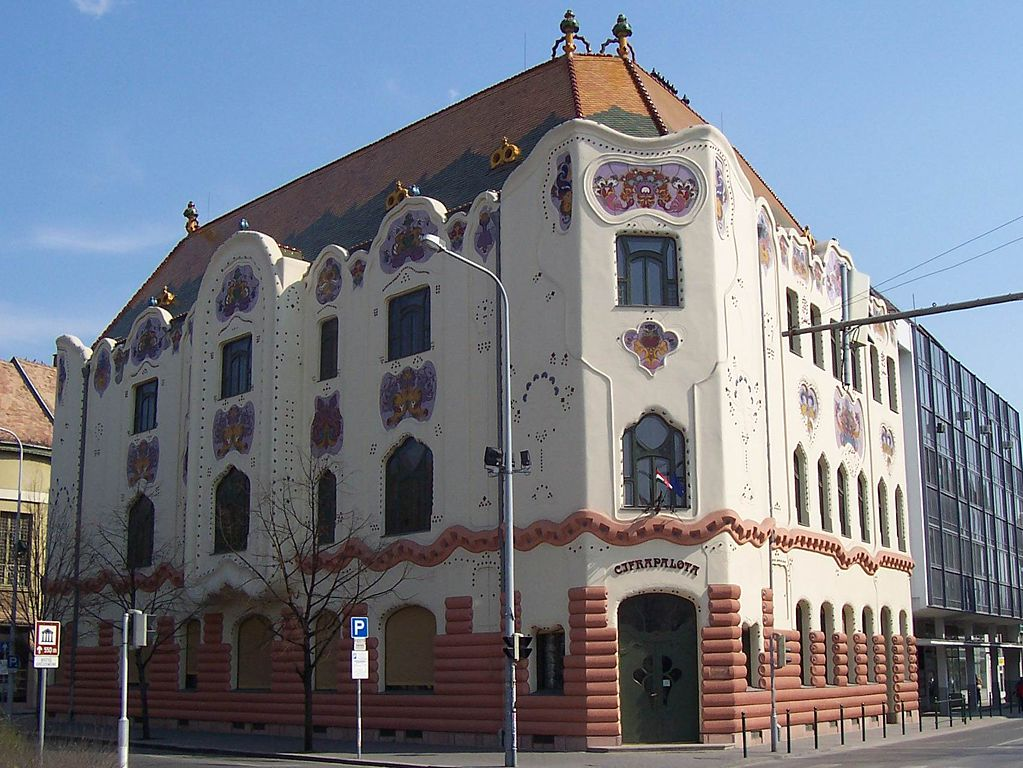
Cifra Palace in Kecskemét

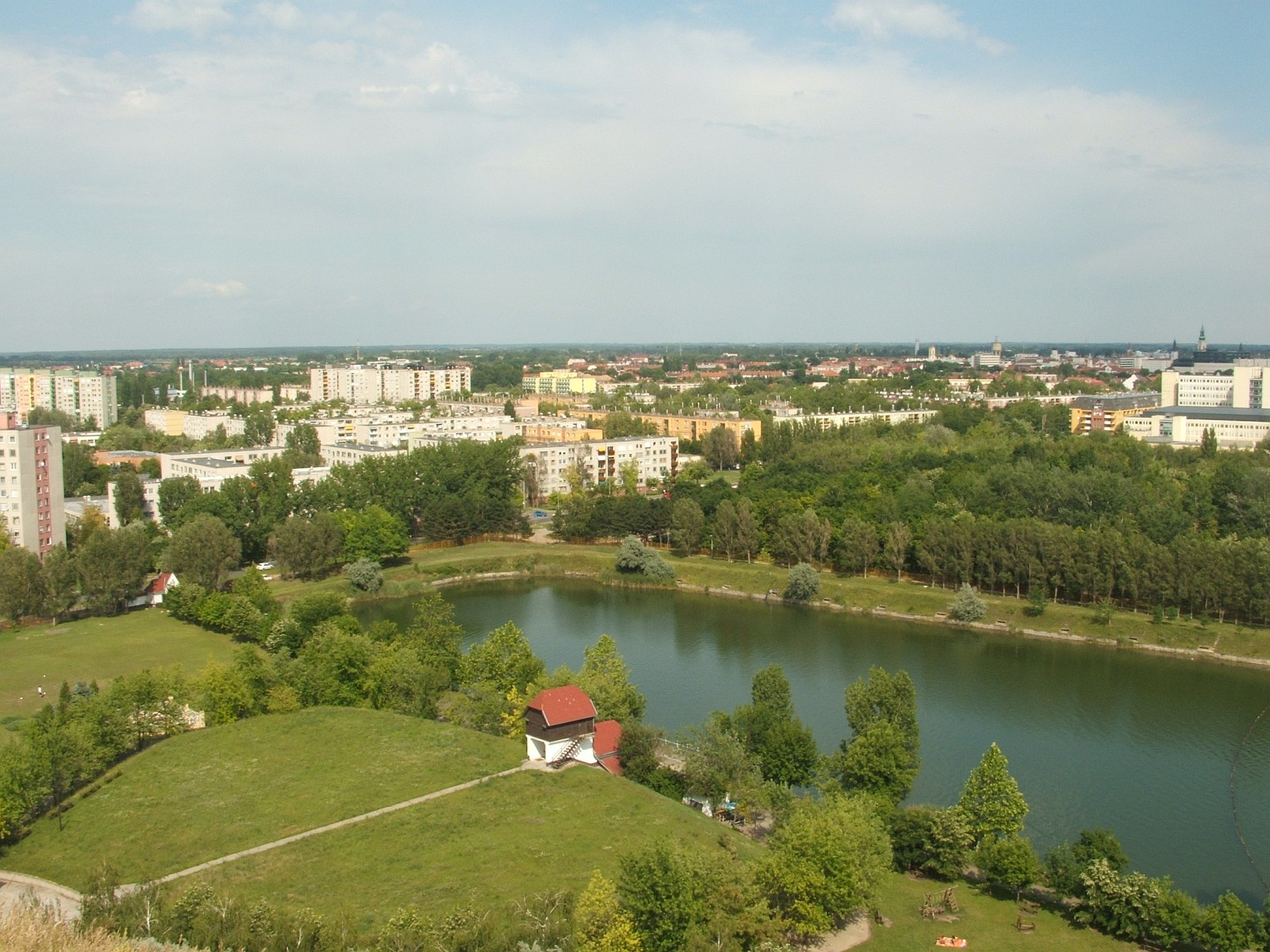
Műkertváros district of Kecskemét

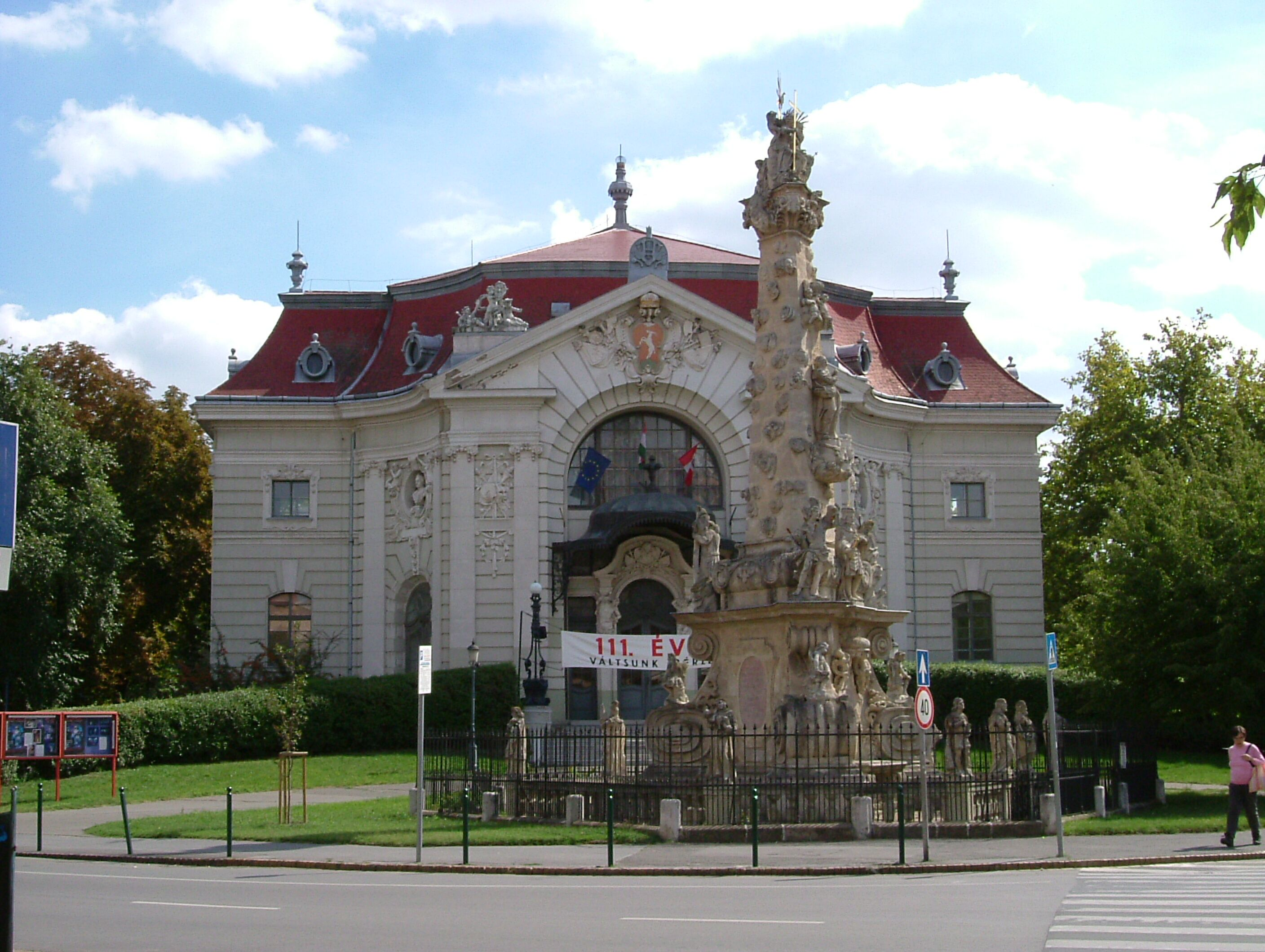
Katona József Theater (Kecskemét)

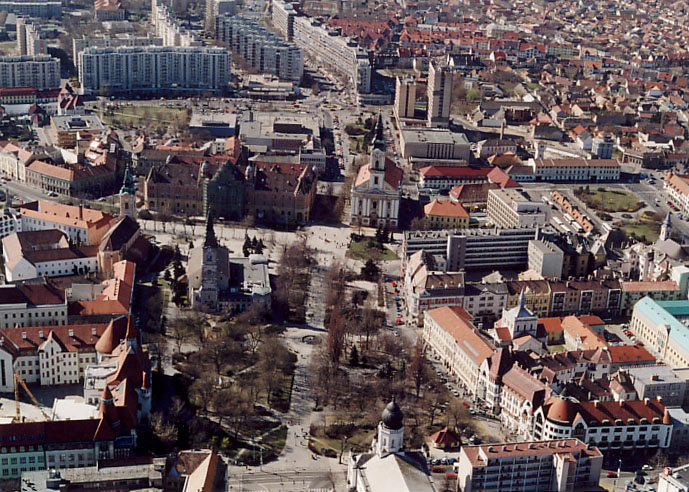
Aerial view of Kecskemét

== See also ==
- List of cities and towns of Hungary
