= Bács-Kiskun County 1st constituency =

Constituency in Hungary (2012-)

Bács-Kiskun County 1st constituency (Kecskemét)
- Constituency for the National Assembly
- Location of Bács-Kiskun county 01 within Bács-Kiskun county

- Location of Bács-Kiskun county within Hungary
- County: Bács-Kiskun
- Electorate: 68,999 (2018)
- Major settlements: Kecskemét

Current constituency
- Created: 2011
- Party: TISZA
- Member: Attila Csőszi
- Elected: 2026
- Coordinates: 46°54′27″N 19°41′30″E

The 1st constituency of Bács-Kiskun County (Hungarian: Bács-Kiskun megyei 01. számú országgyűlési egyéni választókerület) is one of the single member constituencies of the National Assembly, the national legislature of Hungary. The constituency standard abbreviation: Bács-Kiskun 01. OEVK.

Since 2026, it has been represented by Attila Csőszi of the Tisza Party.

== Geography ==
The 1st constituency is located in north-western part of Bács-Kiskun County.

=== List of municipalities ===
The constituency includes the following municipalities:

1. Felsőlajos
2. Fülöpháza
3. Kecskemét: Northwestern part of the city.
4. Kerekegyháza
5. Kunadacs
6. Kunbaracs
7. Kunpeszér
8. Kunszentmiklós
9. Ladánybene
10. Lajosmizse
11. Szabadszállás
12. Szalkszentmárton
13. Tass

== Members ==
The constituency was first represented by László Salacz of the Fidesz from 2014, and he was re-elected in 2018 and 2022.In the 2026 election, Attila Csőszi of the Tisza Party was elected representative.

| Election | Member | Party | % | Ref. |
|---|---|---|---|---|
| 2014 | László Salacz | Fidesz | 51.34 | |
| 2018 | László Salacz | Fidesz | 54.53 | |
| 2022 | László Salacz | Fidesz | 59.02 | |
| 2026 | Attila Csőszi | Tisza | 52.41 | |

== Elections ==
=== Elections in the 2020s ===
Parliamentary election 2022: Bács-Kiskun 01
| Party | Candidate | Votes | % | ±% |
|---|---|---|---|---|
| Fidesz-KDNP | László Salacz | 27,420 | 59.0 | ▲4.5 |
| United for Hungary | Kopping Rita Szőkéné (Note: Appeared on the ballot paper as the DK-Jobbik-Momentum-MSZP-LMP-Párbeszéd candidate) | 13,464 | 29.0 | ▼15.0 |
| Mi Hazánk | Erős Erzsébet | 3,425 | 7.4 | New |
| MKKP | Szabolcs Kordik | 1,691 | 3.64 | New |
| Normal Party | Attiláné Ábrahám | 462 | 1.0 | New |
| Majority | | 13,956 | 30.0 | N/A |
| Turnout | | 46,462 | 66.1 | ▲10.3 |
| Registered electors | | 69,101 | | |
| Fidesz-KDNP hold | | Swing | ▲9.8 | |

Parliamentary election 2026: Bács-Kiskun 01
| Party | Candidate | Votes | % | ±% |
|---|---|---|---|---|
| Tisza | Attila Csőszi | 27,753 | 52.4 | New |
| Fidesz–KDNP | László Salacz | 21,063 | 39.8 | ▼19.2 |
| Mi Hazánk | Károly András | 3611 | 6.8 | ▼0.6 |
| MKKP | Dávid Papp | 525 | 1.0 | ▼2.7 |
| Majority | | 6,690 | 12.6 | N/A |
| Turnout | | 53,286 | 78.5 | ▲12.4 |
| Registered electors | | 67,906 | | |
| Tisza gain from Fidesz-KDNP | | Swing | ▲21.3 (Note: The swing calculation used the result achieved by the United for Hungary alliance in the 2022 election.) | |
