= List of populated places in Hungary (F) =

This is a list of cities, towns and villages of Hungary

KEY: T = Town ; V = Village

Name	Rank	County	District	Population	Post code
Fábiánháza	V	Szabolcs-Szatmár-Bereg	Mátészalkai	1,919	4354
Fábiánsebestyén	V	Csongrád	Szentesi	2,317	6625
Fácánkert	V	Tolna	Szekszárdi	765	7136
Fadd	V	Tolna	Szekszárdi	4,499	7133
Fáj	V	Borsod-Abaúj-Zemplén	Encsi	289	3865
Fajsz	V	Bács-Kiskun	Kalocsai	1,901	6352
Fancsal	V	Borsod-Abaúj-Zemplén	Encsi	371	3855
Farád	V	Gyor-Moson-Sopron	Csornai	1,917	9321
Farkasgyepu	V	Veszprém	Pápai	441	8582
Farkaslyuk	V	Borsod-Abaúj-Zemplén	Ózdi	1,981	3608
Farmos	V	Pest	Nagykátai	3,653	2765
Fazekasboda	V	Baranya	Pécsváradi	210	7732
Fedémes	V	Heves	Pétervásárai	862	3255
Fegyvernek	V	Jász-Nagykun-Szolnok	Törökszentmiklósi	7,006	5231
Fehérgyarmat	T	Szabolcs-Szatmár-Bereg	Fehérgyarmati	8,932	4900
Fehértó	V	Gyor-Moson-Sopron	Csornai	468	9163
Fehérvárcsurgó	V	Fejér	Móri	1,860	8052
Feked	V	Baranya	Mohácsi	214	7724
Feketeerdo	V	Gyor-Moson-Sopron	Mosonmagyaróvári	404	9211
Felcsút	V	Fejér	Bicskei	1,669	8086
Feldebro	V	Heves	Füzesabonyi	2,652	3352
Felgyo	V	Csongrád	Csongrádi	1,472	6645
Felpéc	V	Gyor-Moson-Sopron	Téti	848	9122
Felsoberecki	V	Borsod-Abaúj-Zemplén	Bodrogközi	325	3985
Felsocsatár	V	Vas	Szombathelyi	474	9794
Felsodobsza	V	Borsod-Abaúj-Zemplén	Szikszói	983	3847
Felsoegerszeg	V	Baranya	Sásdi	159	7370
Felsogagy	V	Borsod-Abaúj-Zemplén	Encsi	165	3837
Felsojánosfa	V	Tolna	Oriszentpéteri	213	9934
Felsokelecsény	V	Borsod-Abaúj-Zemplén	Kazincbarcikai	398	3722
Felsolajos	V	Bács-Kiskun	Kecskeméti	981	6055
Felsomarác	V	Tolna	Oriszentpéteri	317	9918
Felsomocsolád	V	Somogy	Kaposvári	559	7456
Felsonána	V	Tolna	Szekszárdi	705	7175
Felsonyárád	V	Borsod-Abaúj-Zemplén	Kazincbarcikai	1,060	3721
Felsonyék	V	Tolna	Tamási	1,131	7099
Felsoörs	V	Veszprém	Balatonalmádi	1,249	8227
Felsopáhok	V	Zala	Keszthely–Hévízi	579	8380
Felsopakony	V	Pest	Gyáli	2,989	2363
Felsopetény	V	Nógrád	Rétsági	768	2611
Felsorajk	V	Zala	Nagykanizsai	803	8767
Felsoregmec	V	Borsod-Abaúj-Zemplén	Sátoraljaújhelyi	251	3989
Felsoszenterzsébet	V	Zala	Lenti	16	8973
Felsoszentiván	V	Bács-Kiskun	Bajai	2,028	6447
Felsoszentmárton	V	Baranya	Sellyei	1,094	7968
Felsoszölnök	V	Vas	Szentgotthárdi	659	9985
Felsotárkány	V	Heves	Egri	7,733	3324
Felsotelekes	V	Borsod-Abaúj-Zemplén	Kazincbarcikai	808	3735
Felsotold	V	Nógrád	Pásztói	175	3067
Felsovadász	V	Borsod-Abaúj-Zemplén	Szikszói	553	3814
Felsozsolca	T	Borsod-Abaúj-Zemplén	Miskolci	7,150	3561
Fényeslitke	V	Szabolcs-Szatmár-Bereg	Kisvárdai	2,468	4621
Fenyofo	V	Gyor-Moson-Sopron	Pannonhalmi	147	8432
Ferencszállás	V	Csongrád	Makói	638	6774
Fertoboz	V	Gyor-Moson-Sopron	Sopron–Fertodi	255	9493
Fertod	T	Gyor-Moson-Sopron	Sopron–Fertodi	3,406	9431
Fertoendréd	V	Gyor-Moson-Sopron	Sopron–Fertodi	635	9442
Fertohomok	V	Gyor-Moson-Sopron	Sopron–Fertodi	524	9492
Fertorákos	V	Gyor-Moson-Sopron	Sopron–Fertodi	2,182	9421
Fertőszentmiklós	V	Gyor-Moson-Sopron	Sopron–Fertodi	3,844	9444
Fertoszéplak	V	Gyor-Moson-Sopron	Sopron–Fertodi	1,180	9436
Fiad	V	Somogy	Tabi	187	7282
Filkeháza	V	Borsod-Abaúj-Zemplén	Sátoraljaújhelyi	104	3994
Fityeház	V	Zala	Nagykanizsai	737	8835
Fokto	V	Bács-Kiskun	Kalocsai	1,707	6331
Folyás	V	Hajdú-Bihar	Polgári	405	4090
Fonó	V	Somogy	Kaposvári	359	7271
Fony	V	Borsod-Abaúj-Zemplén	Abaúj–Hegyközi	421	3893
Fonyód	T	Somogy	Fonyódi	5,257	8640
Forráskút	V	Csongrád	Mórahalmi	2,321	6793
Forró	V	Borsod-Abaúj-Zemplén	Encsi	2,398	3849
Fót	V	Pest	Dunakeszi	16,559	2151
Földeák	V	Csongrád	Makói	3,324	6922
Földes	V	Hajdú-Bihar	Püspökladányi	4,350	4177
Fonyed	V	Somogy	Marcali	94	8732
Fulókércs	V	Borsod-Abaúj-Zemplén	Encsi	395	3864
Furta	V	Hajdú-Bihar	Berettyóújfalui	1,179	4141
Füle	V	Fejér	Székesfehérvári	873	8157
Fülesd	V	Szabolcs-Szatmár-Bereg	Fehérgyarmati	492	4964
Fülöp	V	Hajdú-Bihar	Hajdúhadházi	1,878	4266
Fülöpháza	V	Bács-Kiskun	Kecskeméti	952	6042
Fülöpjakab	V	Bács-Kiskun	Kiskunfélegyházi	1,151	6116
Fülöpszállás	V	Bács-Kiskun	Kiskorösi	2,525	6085
Fülpösdaróc	V	Szabolcs-Szatmár-Bereg	Mátészalkai	336	4754
Fürged	V	Tolna	Tamási	698	7087
Füzér	V	Borsod-Abaúj-Zemplén	Sátoraljaújhelyi	604	3996
Füzérkajata	V	Borsod-Abaúj-Zemplén	Sátoraljaújhelyi	145	3994
Füzérkomlós	V	Borsod-Abaúj-Zemplén	Sátoraljaújhelyi	386	3997
Füzérradvány	V	Borsod-Abaúj-Zemplén	Sátoraljaújhelyi	431	3993
Füzesabony	T	Heves	Füzesabonyi	4,634	3390
Füzesgyarmat	T	Békés	Szeghalmi	6,542	5525
Fuzvölgy	V	Zala	Nagykanizsai	143	8777

== Notes ==
- Cities marked with * have several different post codes, the one here is only the most general one.
