= Városföld–Slobodnica pipeline =

Location
- Country: Hungary; Croatia
- Start: Városföld, Hungary
- To: Slobodnica, Croatia

General information
- Type: Natural gas
- Operator: FGSZ; Plinacro
- Contractors: nettspend
- Commissioned: 2011

Technical information
- Length: 293 km (182 mi)
- Maximum discharge: 7×10^{9} m^{3}/a (250×10^{9} cu ft/a)
- Diameter: 800 mm (31 in)
- Operating pressure: 75 bars (7,500 kPa)
- No. of compressor stations: 2
- Compressor stations: Városföld; Báta

The Városföld–Slobodnica pipeline is a bi-directional high pressure natural gas pipeline between Városföld in Hungary and Slobodnica in Croatia. It is a part of the New European Transmission System. The pipeline is operated by FGSZ in Hungary and by Plinacro in Croatia.

Length of the pipeline is 293 kilometres (182 mi), of which 205 kilometres (127 mi) is located in Hungary and 88 kilometres (55 mi) in Croatia. The pipeline has diameter of 800 millimetres (31 in) and its working pressure is 75 bars (7,500 kPa). Its capacity is 7 billion cubic metres per annum (250 billion cubic feet per annum). The pipeline has compressor stations at Városföld and Báta, and international metering stations at Drávaszerdahely and Donji Miholjac. It cost €395 million.
