= Bács-Kiskun County 2nd constituency =

National Assembly constituency in Hungary (2014–)

Bács-Kiskun County 2nd constituency (Kecskemét)
- Constituency for the National Assembly
- Location of Bács-Kiskun county 02 within Bács-Kiskun county

- Location of Bács-Kiskun county within Hungary
- County: Bács-Kiskun
- Electorate: 72,826 (2018)
- Major settlements: Kecskemét

Current constituency
- Created: 2011
- Party: TISZA
- Member: János Molnár
- Elected: 2026
- Coordinates: 46°54′27″N 19°41′30″E

The 2nd constituency of Bács-Kiskun County (Hungarian: Bács-Kiskun megyei 02. számú országgyűlési egyéni választókerület) is one of the single member constituencies of the National Assembly, the national legislature of Hungary. The constituency standard abbreviation: Bács-Kiskun 02. OEVK.

Since 2026, it has been represented by János Molnár of the Tisza Party.

== Geography ==
The 2nd constituency is located in north-eastern part of Bács-Kiskun County.

=== List of municipalities ===
The constituency includes the following municipalities:

1. Ballószög
2. Helvécia
3. Kecskemét: Main (northeastern, southeastern and southwestern) part of the city.
4. Szentkirály
5. Tiszakécske
6. Városföld

== Members ==
The constituency was first represented by Gábor Zombor of the Fidesz from 2014 to 2022. He was succeeded by Gyula Szeberényi of the Fidesz in 2022. In the 2026 election, János Molnár of the Tisza Party was elected representative.

Election	Member	Party	%	Ref.
2014	Gábor Zombor	Fidesz	51.67	
2018	Gábor Zombor	Fidesz	52.74	
2022	Gyula Szeberényi	Fidesz	53.00	
2026	János Molnár	Tisza Party	56.76	
