= Ionian Adriatic Pipeline =

Albania-Croatia gas transporter

Location
- Country: Albania; Montenegro; Bosnia and Herzegovina; Croatia
- Direction: both directions
- Start: Fier, Albania
- Passes through: Montenegro, Bosnia and Herzegovina
- To: Split, Croatia

General information
- Type: Natural gas
- Expected: 2025/2026

Technical information
- Length: 511 km (318 mi)
- Maximum discharge: 5×10^{9} m^{3} (180×10^{9} cu ft) per year
- Diameter: 800 mm (31 in)
- Operating pressure: 75/85 bar (7.5/8.5 Mpa)

The Ionian Adriatic Pipeline (IAP) is a proposed natural gas pipeline in Southeast Europe. It would run from Fier in Albania through Montenegro, and Bosnia and Herzegovina, to Split in Croatia.

In Fier, IAP would be connected with the Trans Adriatic Pipeline. Trans Adriatic Pipeline AG has signed memorandums of understanding with developers of the IAP project, including Plinacro (Croatia), BH-Gas (Bosnia and Herzegovina), and governments of Montenegro and Albania.

In Split, the pipeline would be connected with the existing gas transmission system of Croatia. In addition, it may be connected with other new gas infrastructure, including the Krk LNG terminal in Krk.

The length of pipeline would be 516 kilometres (321 mi). The pipeline would be bi-directional and its capacity would be 5 billion cubic metres (180 billion cubic feet) of natural gas per year.

The gas pipeline nominal diameter is 800 mm, and the operating pressure is 85/75 bar.

The ministerial declaration on the IAP project was signed on 25 September 2007 in the framework of the Energy Community.

Feasibility Study is drawn up, Designing Phase is in progress, Commissioning is planned in 2025/2026. In August 2016 in Dubrovnik the Ministerial Memorandum of Understanding and Cooperation concerning the cooperation and implementation of IAP was signed among Albania, Croatia, Montenegro and Bosnia and Herzegovina. In accordance with the Memorandum the Project Management Unit (PMU) was established to carry out activities on the project. The members of PMU are representatives of the relevant Ministries and TSOs, and members of SOCAR In February 2018 at the meeting of the Ministerial Council of the Southern Gas Corridor a Letter of Intent was signed on establishing an IAP Project Company among TSOs of IAP relevant countries. The establishing of IAP company is in progress.

== See also ==
- New European Transmission System
- Adriatic–Ionian motorway
