= Ágasegyháza =

Village in Bács-Kiskun, Hungary

- Flag Coat of arms

- Location within Bács-Kiskun County Location within Hungary Location within Europe
- Coordinates: 46°50′N 19°27′E
- Country: Hungary
- County: Bács-Kiskun
- District: Kecskemét

Area
  - Total: 55.87 km^{2} (21.57 sq mi)

Population (2001)
  - Total: 1,920
  - Density: 34.47/km^{2} (89.3/sq mi)
- Time zone: UTC+1 (CET)
  - Summer (DST): UTC+2 (CEST)
- Postal code: 6076
- Area code: 76

Ágasegyháza is a village and municipality in Bács-Kiskun county, in the Southern Great Plain region of southern Hungary.

== Name ==
The village's name originates from the old Hungarian personal name Agus. This may came from the noun ág ('branch'), or was more likely a variation of Ákos. This way it would mean 'the temple of Ákos'. In 1353, 1353 and 1429, the village was recorded as Agaseghaz.

== Geography ==
It covers an area of 55.87 km^{2} (22 sq mi) and has a population of 1920 people as of 2002. The village has a population density of 34.47 km (21 mi).

The village's post code is 6076 and the area code is 76.
