= Reformed Church, Felsőregmec =

Reformed Church of Felsőregmec
- Felsőregmeci református templom (Hungarian)
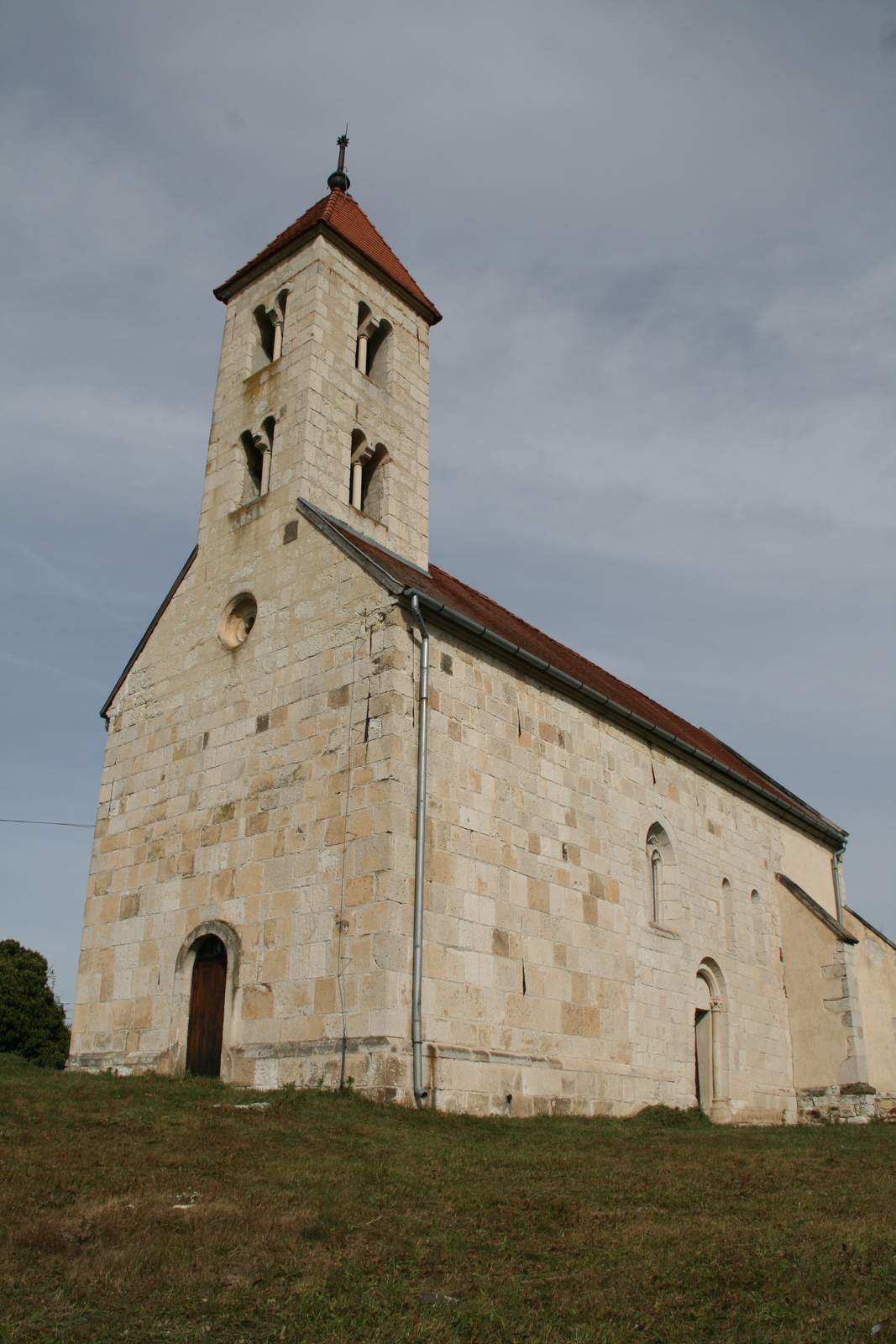

- Location within Hungary
- Location: Felsőregmec
- Country: Hungary
- Denomination: Reformed Christianity
- Previous denomination: Catholicism

Architecture
- Heritage designation: Protected National Monument
- Designated: 1953, 1958
- Style: Romanesque
- Years built: 13th century

Administration
- District: Cistibiscan Church District
- Parish: Reformed Congregation of Pálháza

The Reformed Church of Felsőregmec (Hungarian: Felsőregmeci református templom) is a 13th-century Protestant church in Felsőregmec, Hungary.

== Description ==
The church located not far from the center of the village, has a single nave, a straight-ended sanctuary, and a tower on its western facade. The sanctuary is flanked by a buttress on each of its northeast, southeast, and south sides. Its south facade is adorned with an Árpád-era arched gateway; to the west of this, a Gothic tracery window is visible in the nave wall, while to the east, two Romanesque windows can be seen. On the lower level of the tower, there are three simply designed twin windows on each side, and on the upper level, there are four on each side.

== History ==
The nave was built in the 13th century by the Paulines, who had a monastery in the village. Around the turn of the 14th and 15th centuries, the Romanesque sanctuary was demolished, and in its place, a sanctuary with a cross vault and buttresses was built. Since the Reformation reached Hungary, the Reformed congregation has been using the church. It gained its current appearance during renovations between 1880 and 1885, when its gallery and interior furnishings were made.

== Gallery ==
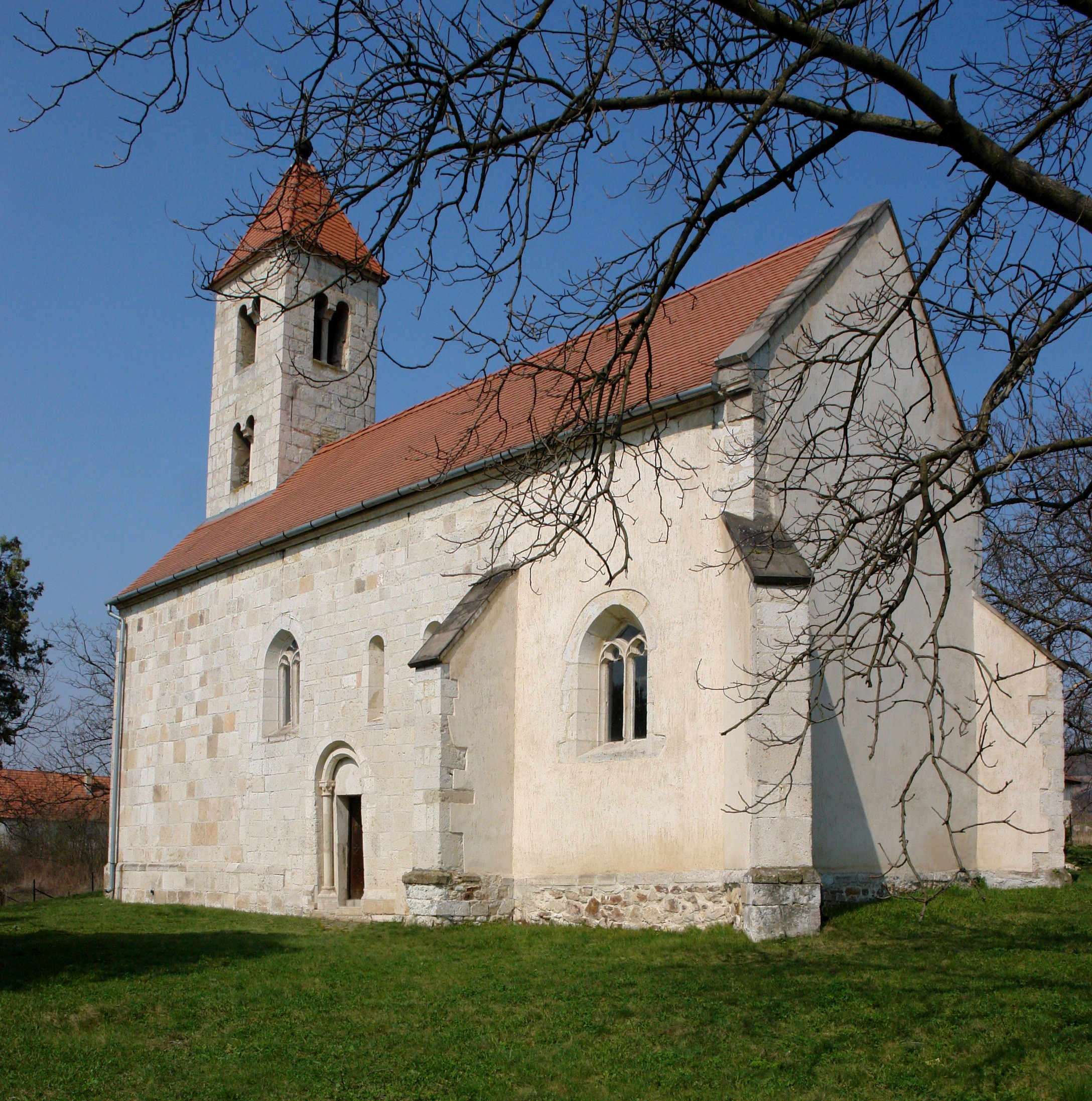

== See also ==
- Reformed Church in Hungary
- Romanesque architecture
- Felsőregmec
