= Petőfiszállás =

Coordinates: 46°37′N 19°50′E

- Interactive map of Petőfiszállás
- Country: Hungary
- County: Bács-Kiskun

Area
  - Total: 67.78 km^{2} (26.17 sq mi)

Population (2015)
  - Total: 1,453
  - Density: 21.4/km^{2} (55/sq mi)
- Time zone: UTC+1 (CET)
  - Summer (DST): UTC+2 (CEST)
- Postal code: 6113
- Area code: 76

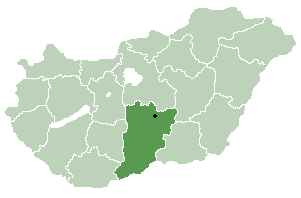
Location of Bács-Kiskun county in Hungary

Petőfiszállás is a village in Bács-Kiskun county, in the Southern Great Plain region of southern Hungary.

== Geography ==
It covers an area of 67.78 km^{2} (26 sq mi) and has a population of 1453 people (2015).
