= Nyárlőrinc =

- Village
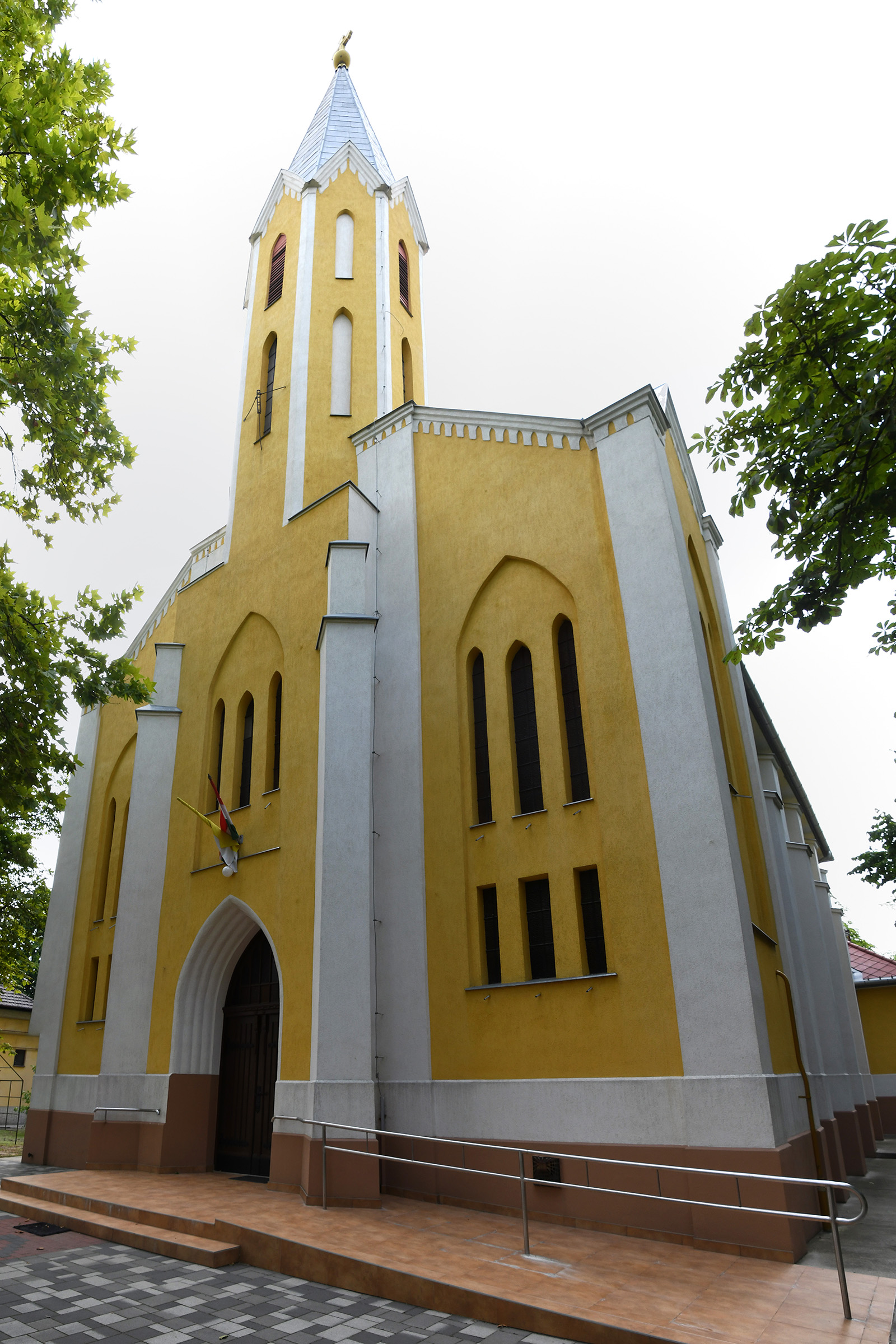
- Saint Lőrinc Catholic Church in Nyárlőrinc

- Flag Coat of arms

- Location of Nyárlőrinc Nyárlőrinc (Hungary) Nyárlőrinc (Europe)
- Coordinates: 46°52′N 19°52′E
- Country: Hungary
- County: Bács-Kiskun
- District: Kecskemét
- Named for: Saint Lawrence

Area
  - Total: 66.36 km^{2} (25.62 sq mi)

Population (2015)
  - Total: 2,336
  - Density: 35.2/km^{2} (91/sq mi)
- Time zone: UTC+1 (CET)
  - Summer (DST): UTC+2 (CEST)
- Postal code: 6032
- Area code: 76

Nyárlőrinc (formerly Koháryszentlőrinc) is a village in Bács-Kiskun county, in the Southern Great Plain region of southern Hungary.

== Geography ==
It covers an area of 66.36 km^{2} (26 sq mi) and had a population of 2336 people in 2015.

== History ==
The centre of the village is home to the ruins of a church dating back to the early Kingdom of Hungary. The village was named after Saint Lawrence, to whom the village's 13th century church was dedicated. Under Turkish rule, the village was entirely depopulated, and its lands became incorporated into the town of Kecskemét as open pastureland. In 1899, an independent settlement was reformed, going by the name of Koháryszentlőrinc, but in 1913 the village was again subsumed under the jusdisction of Kecskemét. The settlement became independent again in 1950, at which point it was given its current name, Nyárlőrinc.

== Demographics ==
As of 2023, the village has a total population of 2289, living in a total of 1009 homes. As of 2022, the town was 89.4% Hungarian, 0.4% German, and 0.3% Gypsy. The population was 42.9% Roman Catholic, and 8.7% Reformed.
