= Helvécia =

Village in Hungary

- Flag Coat of arms

- Location of Helvécia Helvécia (Hungary) Helvécia (Europe)
- Coordinates: 46°50′N 19°37′E
- Country: Hungary
- County: Bács-Kiskun
- District: Kecskemét

Area
  - Total: 56.47 km^{2} (21.80 sq mi)

Population (2015)
  - Total: 4,522
  - Density: 80.1/km^{2} (207/sq mi)
- Time zone: UTC+1 (CET)
  - Summer (DST): UTC+2 (CEST)
- Postal code: 6034
- Area code: 76

Helvécia is a village in Bács-Kiskun county, in the Southern Great Plain region of southern Hungary.

== History ==
Helvécia was founded in 1892 by Swiss-born teacher Heinrich Eduard Weber. After the great phylloxera epidemic that had destroyed much of the historical vineyard plantings in the 1870s, sandy soils of the Great Plains became much more valuable for grape cultivation than before. Helvécia was settled by 501 vineyard workers, most of them from the Balaton wine country. It gained independence of nearby Kecskemét in 1952.

== Geography ==
It covers an area of 73.66 km^{2} (28 sq mi) and has a population of 4,522 people (2015). Most of its inhabitants work in agriculture. Approximately half of the population lives in hamlets. The rest is distributed between two centres approximately 3 km apart from each other: the older Helvécia-Ótelep, and the Szabó-Sándor-telep or Újtelep, originally a housing area for the former collective farm.

== Twin towns – sister cities ==
Helvécia is twinned with:

- Cârța, Romania
- Sirnach, Switzerland
- Vršac, Serbia
- Zatín, Slovakia

== Accident ==
In 1973, a severe level crossing accident took place here with 37 people at least killed.
