= Attila Csőszi =

Hungarian politician

Member of the National Assembly
- Assuming office 9 May 2026
- Succeeding: László Salacz
- Constituency: Bács-Kiskun 1st

Personal details
- Party: Tisza

Attila Csőszi is a Hungarian politician who was elected member of the National Assembly in 2026 representing the Bács-Kiskun County 1st constituency. He previously ran his own business.
