= Lajosmizse =

- Town
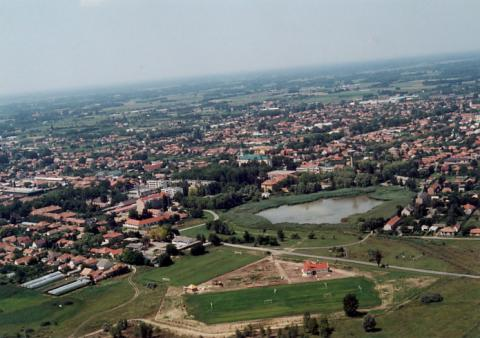
- Aerial photography of Lajosmizse

- Flag Coat of arms

- Location of Lajosmizse
- Coordinates: 47.02643°N 19.55776°E
- Country: Hungary
- County: Bács-Kiskun
- District: Kecskemét

Area
  - Total: 164.66 km^{2} (63.58 sq mi)

Population (2009)
  - Total: 11,053
  - Density: 67.126/km^{2} (173.86/sq mi)
- Time zone: UTC+1 (CET)
  - Summer (DST): UTC+2 (CEST)
- Postal code: 6050
- Area code: (+36) 76
- Website: www.lajosmizse.hu

Lajosmizse is a town in Bács-Kiskun county, Hungary. It is located at the end of a railway line from Budapest.

== History ==
Lajosmizse is situated at the meeting point of north-south and east-west routes. Once the area was covered with groves, then with wind-blown sand. The town stretches over a large area, and is still considered to be a settlement with many outlying parts. People lived here as early as the Bronze Age, and after the Magyar conquest the area became the dwelling place of the chief's clan. Later it was a Crown possession, so that the inhabitants could freely graze their livestock on the king's pastures. Around 1246, King Béla IV resettled Cumans whom he called back from Bulgaria, in this area destroyed during the Mongol invasion. Later, in 1596 during Turkish times, the Tartar hordes devastated the land, during the 15-year war, and the wasteland was leased by the inhabitants of Kecskemét, Nagykőrös and Jászberény for grazing. In 1702 the monarch sold the area to the Teutonic Knights, but the dwellers took joint action and redeemed the lands which had previously been obtained by the Invalides from Pest. This is the origin of the locals' pride in the act of redemption.

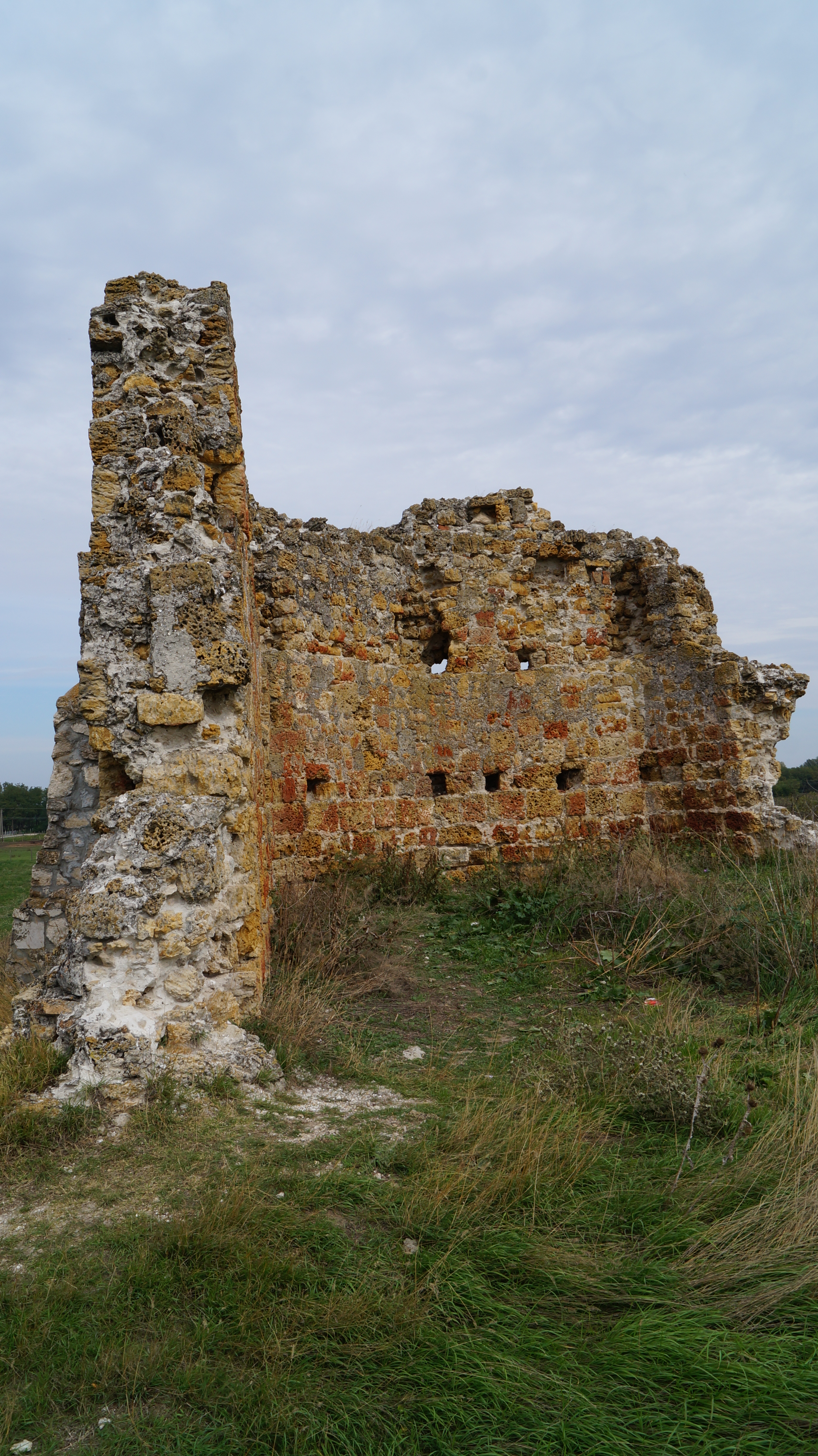
Ruin of Church

The blue in the coat of arms is the colour of transcendence, and signifies that the mediaeval settlement of Mizse already had a stone church, where Franciscan friars were also engaged in converting the reluctant Cumans to Christianity. As soon as the settlement gained independence, its Catholic church was completed by 1896 and, by 1903 the Calvinist church had also been built. The only remaining ruins of the one-time puszta churches are still to be seen here.

The green in the coat of arms recalls the former grovy pastures, on which in the period of the Magyar conquest, and in the Cuman and Turkish times, the breeding of sheep and cattle was dominant; there were also horse herds. As long as 1876, Jász-Lajos-Mizse was considered as the undivided pasture of the town of Jászberény. Having gained the rank of municipality in 1876, the settlement began to grow, but on the outer fields the isolated farmsteads kept on flourishing. The forced organization of co-operative farms in the 1950s brought about changes, but in the new political circumstances in 1989, there were nearly 4000 privately owned farms. The settlement's industry used to be based on agricultural production (mills, oil presses, etc.), but in the past fifty years various kinds of metallurgical, timber, light, domestic, printing, chemical and meat industry have also appeared.

The two combatant lions record that the town once consisted of two settlements. Mizse may have been named after the palatine of King László IV (the Cuman). In the 14th century, one of the two Cuman headquarters called Mizseszék was established here, performing both military and administrative functions. By the end of the 15th century, the feudalisation of the Cumans had shown remarkable progress. There were (mostly unsuccessful) attempts to deprive them of their privileges. The Turkish tax collectors still referred to both Mizse and Lajos as inhabited areas, but they were depopulated after 1596. In nearby Bene-puszta, the grave of a horseman from the time of the Magyar conquest was unearthed and scientifically documented. The findings are believed to be "the remains of the warrior Bene and the ornaments of his garment".

The Jazygian horn, held by the lions, decorated seals as early as the 16th century, serving as the symbol of the Jazygians. It was even related to the well-known legend of the chief Lehel, which is based on two factors. One is that the horn is an artefact from the 9th–10th centuries. The other is that the edge is chipped. This damage may have happened when Lehel struck the German emperor dead. The historical validity of the story is disputed, but its credibility as a legend has remained intact in local tradition. The horn is a symbol of the inhabitants' ethnic coherence, independence and desire for freedom.

The two stars refer to the two main denominations, the Roman Catholics and the Calvinists. It may again be related to one-time valour and tradition that the town's Catholic church was offered to be patronised by Saint Louis IX of France, the holy knight king, commander of the 7th and 8th crusader armies. It cannot be excluded either that the 14th century church was already consecrated to his honour, and the nearby place of dwelling (descensus) was named Lajos from that.

Lajosmizse gained its current name in 1902, and in 1970 the settlement was given back the rank of municipality. In 1993, the President of the Republic of Hungary raised it to the rank of town.

The crest is a memento of the victims and heroes of the past millennium and of the world wars (World War I and World War II), while the crown is the expressive symbol of independence and local autonomy.

=== The Jewish community in Lajosmizse ===
Jews settled in the town in the second half of the 19th century. the community was officially organized in 1898 and joined the Orthodox stream. A synagogue was built in the city in 1925. In the summer of 1941, Jewish forced laborers were sent from Laiuszmija to the Ukrainian front, where the Hungarians fought alongside the Germans, some of whom were captured by the Russians. At the end of April 1944, after the entry of the German army into Hungary, Jews were concentrated in Lajosmizse ghetto which was surrounded by several houses. At the end of June, they were transferred with the Jews of the nearby settlements to the ghetto established in a factory in Monor, and a short time later they were sent to the Auschwitz extermination camp.

== Demographics ==
As of 2023, the town has a total population of 11,653. As of 2022, the town was 86.2% Hungarian, 3.6% Gypsy, and 2.2% of non-European origin. The population was 34.7% Roman Catholic, and 7.1% Reformed.

== Twin towns – sister cities ==
Lajosmizse is twinned with:

- Felsőlajos, Hungary
- Jászberény, Hungary
- Palić (Subotica), Serbia
- Remetea, Romania

== Gallery ==
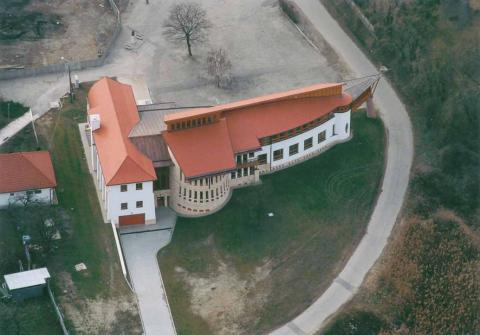

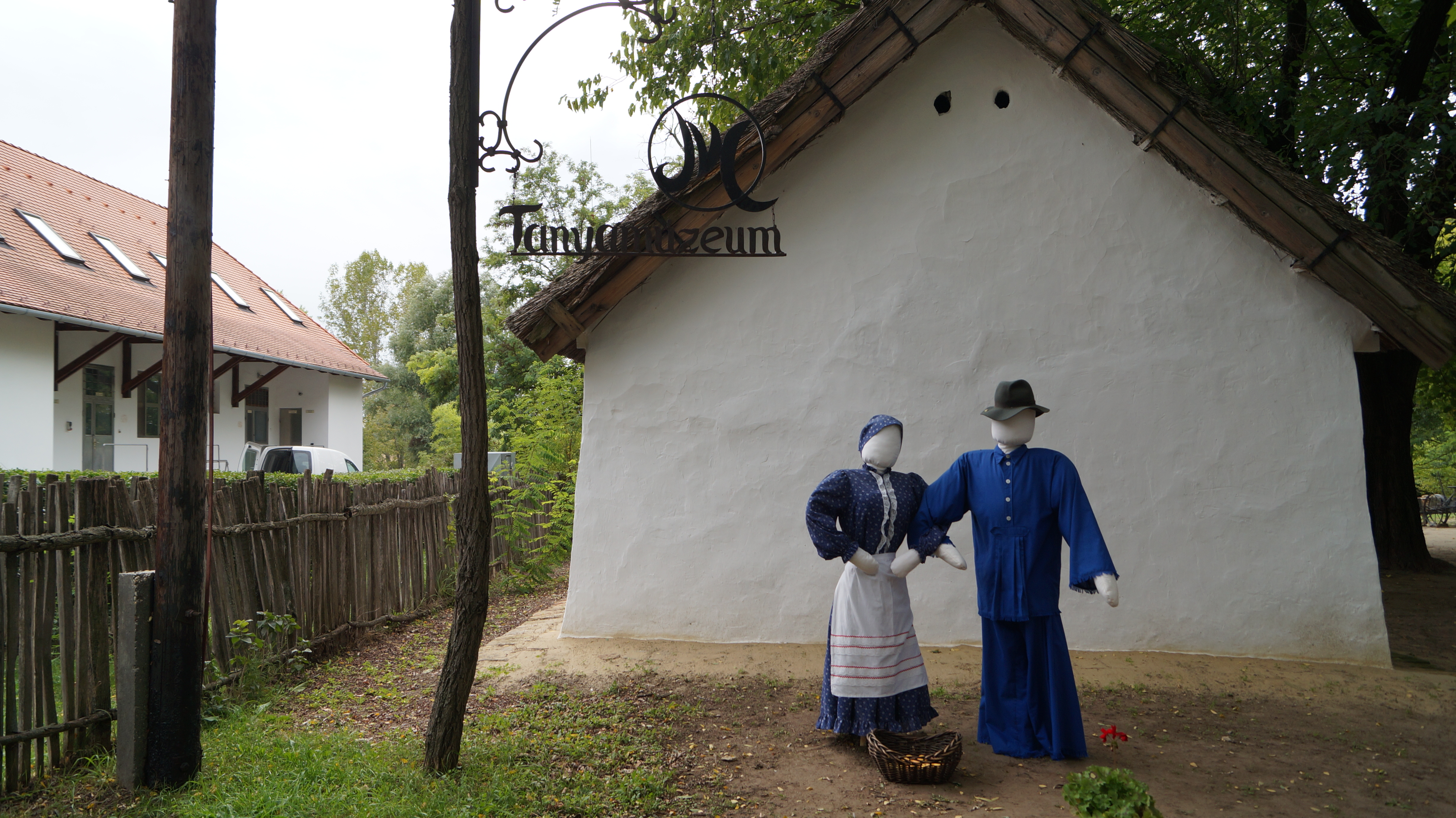

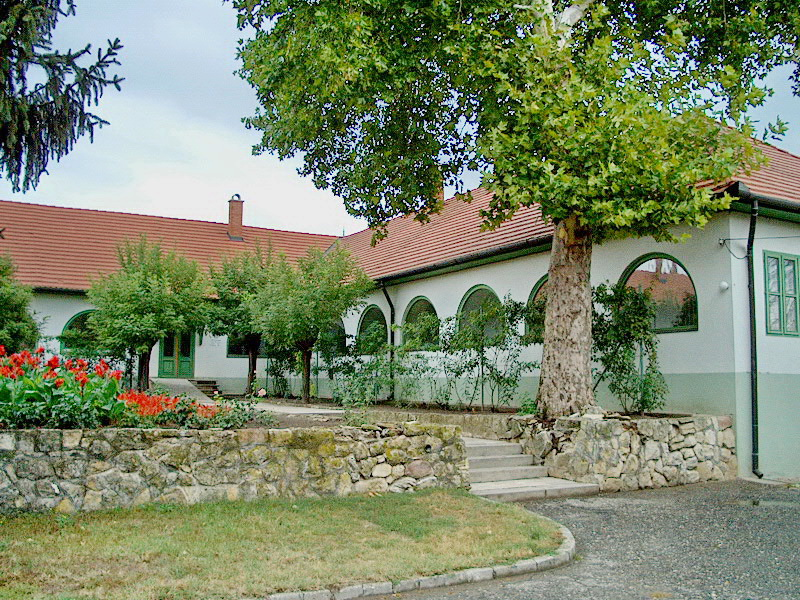
