= János Molnár (politician) =

Hungarian politician

Member of the National Assembly
- Assuming office 9 May 2026
- Succeeding: Gyula Tamás Szeberényi
- Constituency: Bács-Kiskun 2nd

Personal details
- Born: 1973 or 1974 (age 51–52)
- Party: Tisza

János Molnár (born 1973 or 1974) is a Hungarian politician who was elected member of the National Assembly in 2026 representing the Bács-Kiskun County 2nd constituency. He previously worked as an agricultural engineer.
