= New European Transmission System =

The New European Transmission System (NETS) is a project to unite Central and South Eastern Europe's natural gas transmission networks by creating a common gas transmission system operator (TSO). The project is foreseen to create a sizable and efficient regional gas market that significantly enhances gas supply security in the participating countries.

== History ==
The NETS project was proposed by the Hungarian energy company MOL in December 2007. The original invitation to join this project was sent to gas TSOs in Austria, Bosnia-Herzegovina, Bulgaria, Croatia, Romania, Serbia, and Slovenia, with possible extension to other gas TSOs in Central and South Eastern Europe. The proposal was welcomed by the European Commission.

On 13–14 March 2008, seven of the region's gas TSOs (Transgaz of Romania, FGSZ of Hungary (subsidiary of MOL), BH-Gas of Bosnia and Herzegovina, Geoplin of Slovenia, OMV of Austria, Plinacro of Croatia, and Srbijagas of Serbia)) met in Bucharest, Romania, in order to discuss various strategic and business aspects of the initiative. Bulgartransgaz (Bulgaria) decided not to participateint the meeting. The participating companies agreed to start a feasibility study of creating NETS and established four joint working groups to explore the realization of the project.

Second meeting was held in Novi Sad, Serbia, on 21–22 May 2008. Compared with the first meeting, Geoplin and OMV were not represented at the meeting. OMV officially declared that it is not interested in participating in the NETS project for the time being but welcomes to be informed about the progress.
On 26 September 2008, the third meeting of the Transmission System Operators took place in Budapest. During the meeting FGSZ, Transgaz and Plinacro signed a Memorandum of Understanding (MoU) to create a study company of the NETS.

BH-Gas co-signed the document as an observer. The Bulgarian, Slovenian and Serbian TSOs also attended the meeting and stated they would consider working together with the other participants in subject to relevant governmental decisions. Support and co-operation for the NETS project has been offered by the Energy Regulators Regional Association on 21 October 2008. Assistance will be provided through the establishment of a working group by ERRA aimed to addressing the regulatory issues of potential regional gas markets, primarily focusing on the NETS project.

Signatories of the MoU (FGSZ, Plinacro, Transgaz and BH-Gas) met on 21 November 2008 to commence preparations to establish the NETS study company. RA representative from the Energy Regulators Regional Association (ERRA) also attended.

== Rationale ==
Central and Eastern Europe is characterized by inadequate gas infrastructure. For historical reasons, most gas pipelines in Central and South-East Europe run east–west only, without the level of inter-connectivity found in the West of the European Union. These characteristics result in a fragmented and inefficient gas market and greater concerns over security of supply. Improving inter-connectivity, and allowing gas to be moved more easily to wherever it is needed, will make a major contribution towards improving security of supply.

To realize NETS, the harmonization of energy policies and regulatory frameworks are required which is a sizable task for the energy policy makers of the participating countries. The states involved will provide the required regulatory framework to enable the NETS projects to be implemented. Implementation of the NETS project would create an unbundled regional transmission systems according to the EU gas market directive, pool transmission system operators into a single corporate framework, and establish a unified code and tariff system for the resulting network.

In its Green Paper - Towards a secure, sustainable and competitive European energy network (SEC(2008)2869), the European Commission describes the project as "a highly promising initiative to integrate gas transmission operators across Central and South Eastern Europe. NETS has the possibility to create the framework for a regional gas market. Such a market would have sufficient size to attract new investments, which is not the case for the individual national markets, and could significantly reduce operating and investment costs."

The Hungarian Government also expressed its strong support for the NETS initiative. State Secretary for Energy in the Hungarian Ministry of Transport, Telecommunication and Energy Mr Péter Gordos has been appointed to be in charge of NETS at state level communications.

== Study company ==
The project company shall consist of FGSZ/MOL Group, Transgaz and Plinacro and BH-Gas for the time being as an observer with possible participation of other companies. The company is to be established in 2009.

== See also ==
- Energy Community
- Nabucco Pipeline
- Ionian Adriatic Pipeline
- Trans Adriatic Pipeline
