= LNG Hrvatska =

Croatian gas company

- Company type: Public
- Industry: Oil and gas industry
- Founded: 8 June 2010
- Headquarters: Zagreb, Croatia
- Key people: Ivan Fugaš, Managing director
- Services: Gas transportation
- Revenue: ▲42.420 million EUR (2023)
- Net income: ▲1.132 million EUR (2023)
- Owner: Republic of Croatia
- Number of employees: 33 (2023)
- Parent: Hrvatska elektroprivreda d.d. Plinacro d.o.o.
- Website: https://lng.hr/en/home/

LNG Hrvatska d.o.o. (known in English as LNG Croatia) is Croatian energy company that operates a floating liquefied natural gas (LNG) regasification terminal in Omišalj on the island of Krk, Croatia. Since the 2010s, the overall capacity and output of LNG Hrvatska has increased steadily.

== History ==
The project was first considered in 1995 when initial exploratory work was undertaken. A feasibility study was completed by 2008 and the location permit was issued in 2010 after environmental impact assessment was carried out. The project was developed by Adria LNG, which shareholders were E.ON Ruhrgas, Total S.A., OMV, RWE, and Geoplin. The consortium slated a 25% stake for Croatian partners, expecting to include oil company INA (14%), power company HEP and gas pipeline operator Plinacro (together 11%). In October 2009, one of the project partners RWE withdrew from the project. In December 2010 the consortium closed its office in Croatia, which marked the end of the project. In April 2016 First Deputy prime minister Tomislav Karamarko announced the restart of the project.

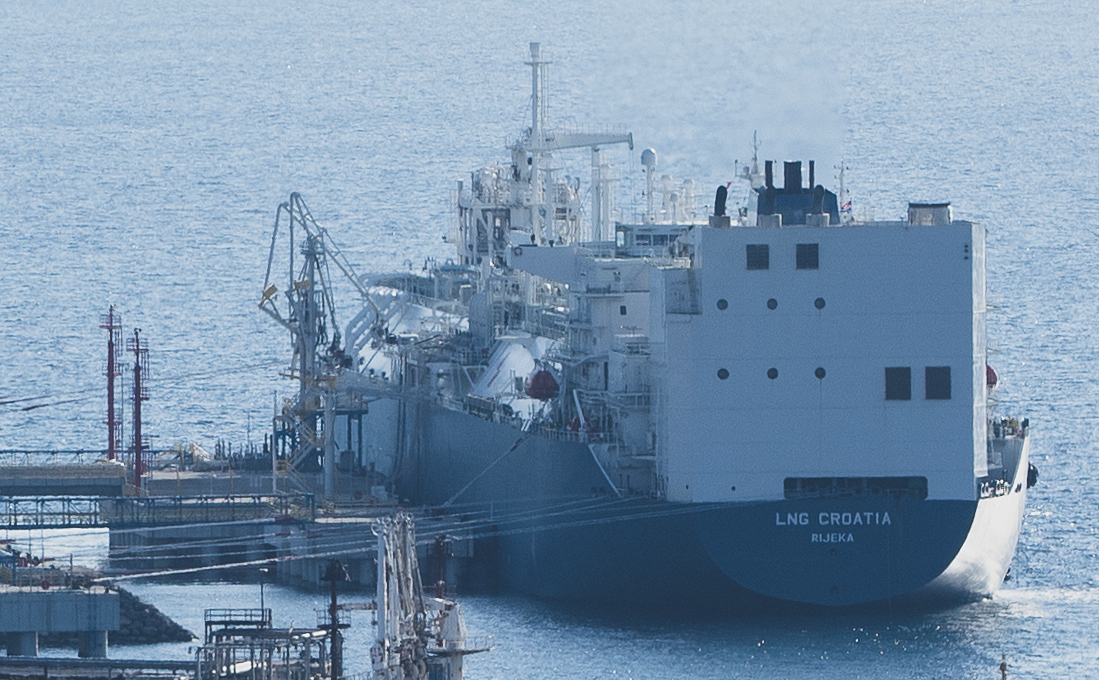
A large LNG Croatia terminal on the coast of Krk island, 2005

On 30 November 2017 front-end engineering and design (FEED) was developed by Belgian company Tractebel. FEED is like a basic variant of floating construction LNG terminal on the island of Krk predicted the "most complex" scenario, which involves the FSRU ship of larger dimensions and the construction of the foundations of the concrete shore system reinforced concrete caissons. The project was officially inaugurated in January 2021. In April 2022, due to the outbreak of the crisis caused by the Russian invasion of Ukraine, it was decided to increase the LNG gasification capacity to 338,000 cubic metres per hour, whi ch is about 2.9 billion cubic meters annually.

Due to the global energy crisis that started in 2021, the Government of Croatia made a strategic decision on August 18, 2022, to increase the capacity of the LNG terminal and the Zlobin–Bosiljevo gas pipeline. The capacity of the terminal will be increased to 6.1 billion cubic meters, and the investment will cost a total of 180 million euros, of which 25 million relate to the terminal and 155 million to the gas pipeline.

On April 14, 2023, Wartsila Gas Solutions from Norway and LNG Croatia concluded a contract worth 22.97 million euros for the delivery of an additional gasification module that will be installed at the terminal, with a maximum capacity of 250 thousand cubic meters of natural gas per hour, which will increase the terminal's capacity to almost doubled, to 6.1 billion cubic meters of natural gas per year. Production will last 22 months, and it will be installed on the ship LNG Croatia in the summer of 2025.

== Geopolitical impact ==
The development of Croatia's liquefied natural gas (LNG) capacity and LNG Croatia has materially enhanced energy independence for Croatia and Southeast Europe. It diversified the region's energy market and supply chain securtity for the European Union and neighbors in the region. Croatia relies on natural gas for 48% of its energy demand. LNG Croatia received renewed attention during the 2022 Russian invasion of Ukraine for its ability to diversify European energy away from Russia. Croatia itself has not been dependent on Russian gas since 2010.

== Technical features ==
The annual handling capacity of the vessel is 2.6 billion cubic meters. The terminal can accommodate all ship sizes from 3,500 to 265,000 cubic meters.

=== Floating storage and regasification unit ===
The floating storage and regasification unit (FSRU) vessel consists of LNG storage tanks, equipment for LNG loading and unloading and LNG regasification equipment. All processes on board are monitored by the operator from the central control room while autonomous safety systems are in operation in case of fire and gas occurrence. The FSRU vessel is equipped with four LNG storage tanks with a total capacity of 140,206 m3, three LNG regasification units with a maximum regasification rate of 451,840 m3/h and with power plant which generates electricity for the purpose of operating the terminal.

Regasification of LNG is performed by exchanging the heat of seawater and LNG over glycol as an intermediate fluid. Seawater transfers its heat to glycol and is afterwards discharged back to the sea without any treatment. The glycol afterwards transfers heat to the LNG which is regasified during this process. Natural gas is then through high-pressure offloading arms, delivered to the gas transmission system of the Republic of Croatia.

=== Onshore part of the terminal ===
The onshore part of the LNG terminal consists of the jetty head, breasting dolphins for FSRU berthing, mooring dolphins for FSRU and LNG carrier berthing, quick release hooks, the access bridge, the high-pressure offloading arms with connecting pipeline, pig launching station, firefighting system, terminal control building, and associated facilities. The FSRU vessel is moored to the jetty and connected to the high-pressure offloading arms through which natural gas enters the connecting pipeline. In addition to the mooring of the FSRU, the jetty is also designed for the indirect acceptance of the LNG carrier, which is moored side by side to the FSRU vessel during transfer of the LNG.

Jetty head is the main part of the jetty, constructed as a platform on concrete piles. High pressure offloading arms with a connection to the connecting pipeline are located on the top part of the jetty head. The natural gas is transported through the connecting pipeline to the Omišalj gas node where the connecting pipeline is connected to transmission system of the Republic of Croatia. Breasting dolphins for FSRU vessel berthing are constructed on concrete piles, equipped with fenders for safe berthing of the FSRU vessel.

The mooring dolphins for FSRU vessel and LNG carrier mooring are constructed on concrete piles, equipped with quick release hook mooring system to carry out unmooring of FSRU vessel in a safe and fast way in case of emergency. The jetty head, breasting dolphins and mooring dolphins for FSRU and LNG carrier berthing are connected by catwalks. A 90 m-long (300 ft) access bridge, with access pavement and sidewalk, connects the jetty head with onshore part of the jetty.

The connecting gas pipeline, with nominal diameter 1.000 mm and operating pressure of 100 bar is 4.2 km long. Starting point of the connecting pipeline is located at the jetty head and the end point is located on the Omišalj gas node. Main function of the connecting pipeline is send-out of the natural gas from terminal and its delivery to transmission system of the Republic of Croatia.

The connecting water supply line, with nominal diameter 90 mm and with a total length of 2.5 km is connected to the public water supply system at manhole near the state road D102. Main function of the water supply system is to provide water on the LNG facility for sanitary purposes, as well as for the filling of terminal firefighting water tank.

== Project company ==
The project is developed by LNG Hrvatska. The shareholders of the company are:

- Hrvatska elektroprivreda (HEP) d.d. 75%
- Plinacro d.o.o. 25%

Both of the shareholders are in 100% ownership of the Republic of Croatia. The managing director of the company is Ivan Fugaš, since 1 June 2023.

== See also ==
- Energy in Croatia
- Industry in Croatia
