= Sibinj =

- Municipality
- Interactive map of Sibinj
- Location within Croatia
- Coordinates: 45.19°N 17.91°E
- Country: Croatia
- County: Brod-Posavina County

Government
  - Mayor: Josip Pavić (HS)

Area
  - Municipality: 103.6 km^{2} (40.0 sq mi)
  - Urban: 23.9 km^{2} (9.2 sq mi)

Population (2021)
  - Municipality: 5,730
  - Density: 55.3/km^{2} (143/sq mi)
  - Urban: 2,088
  - Urban density: 87.4/km^{2} (226/sq mi)
- Postal code: 35252 Sibinj
- Website: sibinj.hr

Sibinj is a village and municipality in Brod-Posavina County, Croatia. It is part of the Slavonski Brod build-up area.

== Demographics ==
In 2021, the municipality had 5,730 residents in the following 12 settlements:

- Bartolovci, population 637
- Brčino, population 137
- Čelikovići, population 57
- Gornji Andrijevci, population 377
- Grgurevići, population 98
- Grižići, population 93
- Gromačnik, population 442
- Jakačina Mala, population 114
- Ravan, population 102
- Sibinj, population 2,088
- Slobodnica, population 1,314
- Završje, population 271
Sibinj: Population trends 1857–2021
v

population	3455	3561	3240	3793	4074	4688	4478	5160	5663	6005	6549	6683	6572	6886	7549	6895	5730
	1857	1869	1880	1890	1900	1910	1921	1931	1948	1953	1961	1971	1981	1991	2001	2011	2021

Sources: Croatian Bureau of Statistics publications

The majority of population are Croats, according to the 2011 census.

== See also ==
- Sibinj railway station
