= Genevation GenPro =

GenPro

General information
- Type: Aerobatic aircraft
- National origin: Hungary
- Manufacturer: Genevation
- Designer: Csaba Farkas

History
- First flight: May 2018

The Genevation GenPro is an aerobatic aircraft manufactured in Jakabszállás, Hungary by Genevation. It was first flown in May 2018.

It is the world's first full carbon/steel hybrid truss construction aerobatic aircraft, using a unique construction process. It is very light and has a low stall speed of 49 knots. It can handle forces up to +/-10g. It is a single-seater aircraft, powered by a Lycoming IO-580.

It was developed with a grant from the Hungarian government. Knowledge gained from developing the GenPro was later used to develop a prototype hydrogen-powered rotorcraft.
