= László Salacz =

Hungarian lawyer and politician

Member of the National Assembly
- In office 6 May 2014 – 8 May 2026
- Constituency: Bács-Kiskun 1

Personal details
- Born: 21 May 1971 (age 55) Kalocsa, Hungary
- Party: Fidesz
- Education: University of Szeged

László Salacz (born in Kalocsa, Hungary on 21 May 1971) is a Hungarian lawyer and politician. He was a member of parliament in the National Assembly of Hungary (Országgyűlés) from May 2014 to May 2026 and is also a member of the Hungarian Bar Association.

== Political career ==
Since 2004, Salacz has been a member of Fidesz. In the 2014 election, Salacz was elected to represent the constituency of Bács-Kiskun 1 with 51.34% of the vote. Salacz was re-elected in 2018 and 2022 with 54.53% and 59.02% of the vote respectively. Throughout his parliamentary career, Salacz was a member of the Legislative Committee from 2014 to 2026. He served as a vice-chairman of the aforementioned committee since 2017. Salacz was defeated by Tisza candidate Attila Csőszi in the 2026 Hungarian parliamentary election, thus he did not secure a mandate after 12 years.
