= Jakabszállás =

- Flag Coat of arms

- Location of Jakabszállás Jakabszállás (Hungary) Jakabszállás (Europe)
- Coordinates: 46°45′42″N 19°36′04″E
- Country: Hungary
- County: Bács-Kiskun

Area
  - Total: 70.86 km^{2} (27.36 sq mi)

Population (2005)
  - Total: 2,634
  - Density: 37/km^{2} (96/sq mi)
- Time zone: UTC+1 (CET)
  - Summer (DST): UTC+2 (CEST)
- Postal code: 6078
- Area code: 76

Jakabszállás is a village in Bács-Kiskun county, in the Southern Great Plain region of Hungary.

== Geography ==
It covers an area of 70.86 km^{2} (27 sq mi) and had a population of 2634 people in 2005.

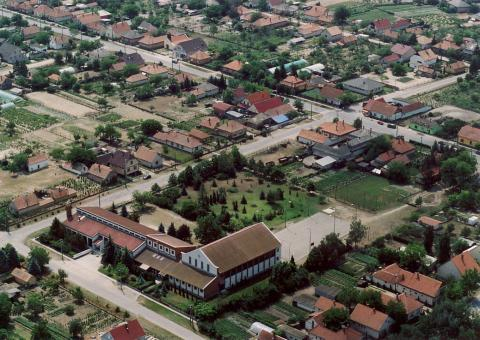
Aerial photography of Jakabszállás

It has an airport, Jakabszállás Airport (ICAO: LHJK), with tarmac and grass runways. It is home to Genevation Aircraft.
