= Fülöpjakab =

Village in Bács-Kiskun, Hungary

- Flag Coat of arms

- Location of Fülöpjakab Fülöpjakab (Hungary) Fülöpjakab (Europe)
- Coordinates: 46°44′31″N 19°43′19″E
- Country: Hungary
- County: Bács-Kiskun
- District: Kecskemét

Area
  - Total: 2,830.16 km^{2} (1,092.73 sq mi)

Population (2025)
  - Total: 1,173
- Time zone: UTC+1 (CET)
  - Summer (DST): UTC+2 (CEST)
- Postal code: 6116
- Area code: 76

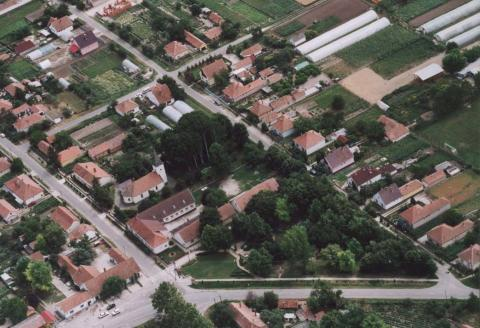
Aerial photography of Fülöpjakab

Fülöpjakab is a village in Bács-Kiskun county, in the Southern Great Plain region of Hungary.

== Geography ==
It covers an area of 2,830.16 km^{2} (1,093 sq mi) and had a population of 1131 people in 2005.
