= Kunbaracs =

Coordinates: 46°59′N 19°25′E

- Interactive map of Kunbaracs
- Country: Hungary
- County: Bács-Kiskun

Area
  - Total: 55.12 km^{2} (21.28 sq mi)

Population (2015)
  - Total: 618
  - Density: 11.2/km^{2} (29/sq mi)
- Time zone: UTC+1 (CET)
  - Summer (DST): UTC+2 (CEST)
- Postal code: 6043
- Area code: 76

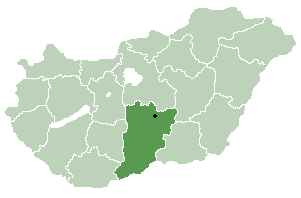
Location of Bács-Kiskun county in Hungary

Kunbaracs is a village in Bács-Kiskun county, in the district of Kecskemét city, in the Southern Great Plain region of southern Hungary. As of 2015, its population was 618, which makes it the smallest settlement in this area.

== Geography ==
It covers an area of 55.12 km^{2} (21 sq mi). The village is 25 km from Kecskemét. The nearest towns are Lajosmizse and Kerekegyháza. The settlement is surrounded by woods, which mostly belong to the Kiskunság National Park.

== Sights of the village ==
Northwest of the village is the "Red" manor-house, which is protected as an art memorial. It was named after its red-tiled roof. The oldest part of the building is the arched hall at the first ground, probably built around 1780. Its original function was possibly a cattle or sheep barn.

Its first owner was the Teleky family, and later the Zeyk family.

In the 1990s the building was totally destroyed. The restoration was completed in 2000. However, the style is different from the original.
