= Plinacro =

- Company type: State-owned company
- Industry: Oil and gas industry
- Founded: February 1, 2001
- Headquarters: Zagreb, Croatia
- Key people: Ivica Arar (President of the Board)
- Services: Natural gas transmission
- Owner: Republic of Croatia 100%
- Subsidiaries: Podzemno skladište plina d.o.o.
- Website: www.plinacro.hr

Plinacro is a natural gas transmission system operator in Croatia.

== History ==
Plinacro was founded on 1 February 2001 as a subsidiary of INA. Since March 2002, Plinacro is a fully state-owned company.

== Operations ==
Plinacro operates 2,548.66 kilometres (1,583.66 mi) of high pressure gas pipelines. On 3 March 2009, Plinacro signed an agreement with FGSZ Zrt, a subsidiary of MOL Group, to build a 294-kilometre-long (183 mi) 6.5 billion cubic metres (230 billion cubic feet) natural gas interconnector between Croatia and Hungary, which would allow two-way shipments after the Adria LNG terminal is built on the island of Krk. Plinacro was also invited to the consortium building Adria LNG terminal. After failure of Adria LNG terminal, Plinacro participated in LNG Hrvatska project where they own 16% of stocks.

Plinacro is participating in the work of creation of the New European Transmission System, a project to unite Central and South Eastern Europe's natural gas transmission networks.

In January 2009, it was decided that Plinacro will buy the Okoli gas storage facility from INA as a result of the INA's takeover by MOL.
