= Fülöpháza =

Village in Hungary

- Flag Coat of arms

- Location of Fülöpháza Fülöpháza (Hungary) Fülöpháza (Europe)
- Coordinates: 46°53′N 19°25′E
- Country: Hungary
- County: Bács-Kiskun
- District: Kecskemét

Area
  - Total: 47.06 km^{2} (18.17 sq mi)

Population (2015)
  - Total: 841
  - Density: 17.9/km^{2} (46/sq mi)
- Time zone: UTC+1 (CET)
  - Summer (DST): UTC+2 (CEST)
- Postal code: 6042
- Area code: 76

Fülöpháza is a village in Bács-Kiskun county, in the Southern Great Plain region of Hungary.

== Geography ==
It covers an area of 47.06 km^{2} (18 sq mi) and has a population of 841 people as of 2015.
