= Zatín =

Zatín Zétény
- Municipality
- Flag

- Location of Zatín in the Košice Region Location of Zatín in Slovakia
- Coordinates: 48.48°N 21.90°E
- Country: Slovakia
- Region: Košice Region
- District: Trebišov District
- First mentioned: 1233

Government
  - Mayor: Mikuláš Kukó (Hungarian Alliance)

Area
  - Total: 21.77 km^{2} (8.41 sq mi)
- Elevation: 100 m (330 ft)

Population (2025)
  - Total: 708
- Time zone: UTC+1 (CET)
  - Summer (DST): UTC+2 (CEST)
- Postal code: 765 3
- Area code: +421 56
- Vehicle registration plate (until 2022): TV
- Website: www.obeczatin.sk

Zatín (Hungarian: Zétény) is a village and municipality in the Trebišov District in the Košice Region of eastern Slovakia.

== Geography ==
The municipality lies at an altitude of 100 metres (330 ft) and covers an area of 21.77 km^{2} (8.41 sq mi) (2025).

== Population ==
Population statistic (10 years)
Year	1995	2005	2015	2025
Count	789	777	816	708
Difference		−1.52%	+5.01%	−13.23%

Population statistic
Year	2024	2025
Count	727	708
Difference		−2.61%

It has a population of 708 people (31 December 2025).

=== Ethnicity ===
Census 2021 (1+ %)
Ethnicity	Number	Fraction
Hungarian	593	78.96%
Slovak	195	25.96%
Not found out	24	3.19%
Romani	13	1.73%
Total	751	

In year 2021 was 751 people by ethnicity 593 as Hungarian, 195 as Slovak, 24 as Not found out, 13 as Romani, 4 as Czech, 3 as Ukrainian, 3 as Rusyn and 1 as German.

Note on population: The difference values of population numbers in the table "Population statistic" and in the sections "Ethnicity" & "Religion" is caused by the use of various statistical methods.

=== Religion ===
Census 2021 (1+ %)
Religion	Number	Fraction
Roman Catholic Church	490	65.25%
Calvinist Church	80	10.65%
None	69	9.19%
Greek Catholic Church	56	7.46%
Jehovah's Witnesses	25	3.33%
Not found out	19	2.53%
Total	751	

In year 2021 was 751 people by religion 490 from Roman Catholic Church, 80 from Calvinist Church, 69 from None, 56 from Greek Catholic Church, 25 from Jehovah's Witnesses, 19 from Not found out, 6 from Evangelical Church, 3 from Old Catholic Church, 1 from Eastern Orthodox Church, 1 from United Methodist Church and 1 from Ad hoc movements.
