= Kerekegyháza =

- Town
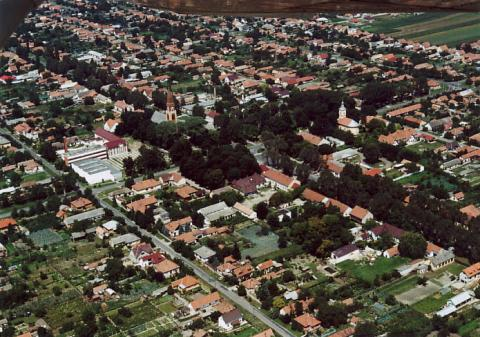
- Aerial view

- Flag Coat of arms

- Location within Hungary
- Coordinates: 46.56°N 19.29°E
- Country: Hungary
- County: Bács-Kiskun
- District: Kecskemét

Area
  - Total: 81.28 km^{2} (31.38 sq mi)

Population (2008)
  - Total: 6,180
  - Density: 76.6/km^{2} (198/sq mi)
- Time zone: UTC+1 (CET)
  - Summer (DST): UTC+2 (CEST)
- Postal code: 6041
- Area code: (+36) 76
- Website: kerekegyhaza.hu

Kerekegyháza is a town in Bács-Kiskun county, in southern Hungary.
