= Ballószög =

Coordinates: 46°52′N 19°35′E

- Interactive map of Ballószög
- Country: Hungary
- County: Bács-Kiskun

Area
  - Total: 35 km^{2} (14 sq mi)

Population (2015)
  - Total: 3,459
  - Density: 99/km^{2} (260/sq mi)
- Time zone: UTC+1 (CET)
  - Summer (DST): UTC+2 (CEST)
- Postal code: 6035
- Area code: 76

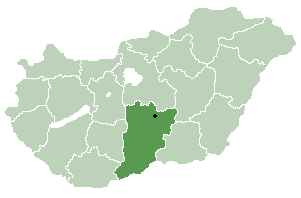
Location of Bács-Kiskun county in Hungary

Ballószög is a village and municipality in Bács-Kiskun county, in the Southern Great Plain region of southern Hungary.

== Geography ==
It covers an area of 35 km^{2} (14 sq mi) and has a population of 3459 people (2015).
