= Slobodnica =

- village
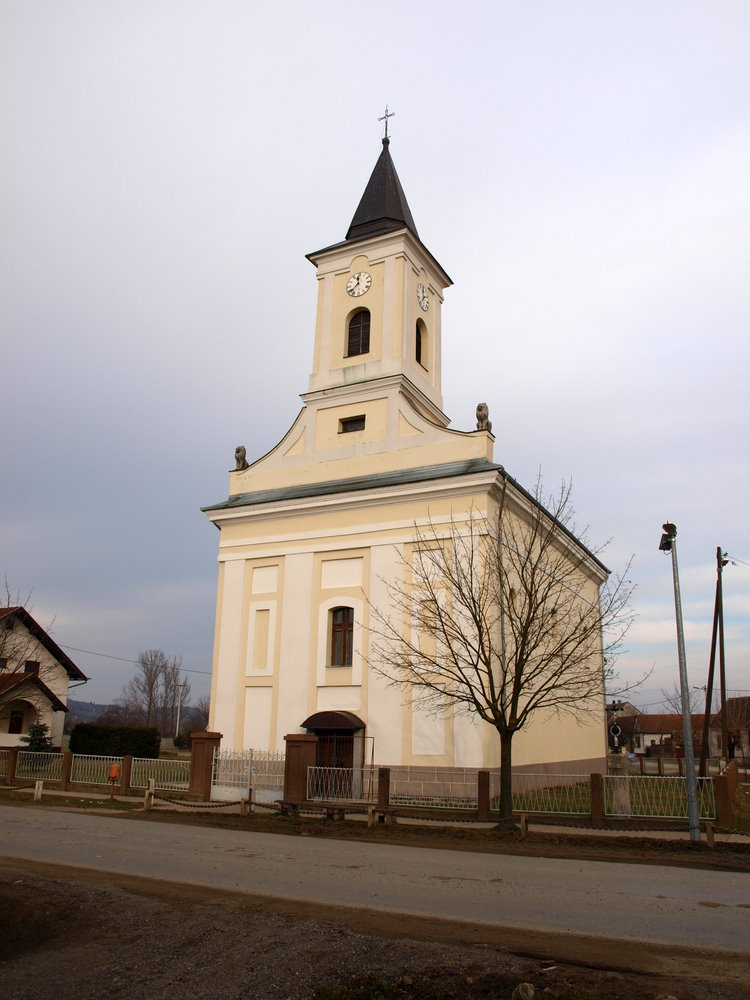
- Church of St. Mark the Evangelist in Slobodnica was first mentioned in 1730

- Location within Croatia
- Coordinates: 45°09′N 17°55′E
- Country: Croatia
- County: Brod-Posavina
- Municipality: Sibinj

Area
  - Total: 15.6 km^{2} (6.0 sq mi)

Population (2021)
  - Total: 1,314
  - Density: 84.2/km^{2} (218/sq mi)
- Time zone: UTC+1 (CET)
  - Summer (DST): UTC+2 (CEST)
- Postal code: 35252 Sibinj
- Area code: 35

Slobodnica is a village in the municipality of Sibinj of the Brod-Posavina County. The village is adjacent to the western borders of the city of Slavonski Brod, Croatia.

== Demographics ==
According to the 2001 national census, Slobodnica has a total population of 1,592 and a density of 87 inhabitants per square kilometer. The largest age group are young people aged 5-44.

The village is predominantly Roman Catholic and 97% of its population are Croats.

== Infrastructure and Economy ==
Slobodnica has an advantageous geographical position.

Traffic-wise the most significant part of Slobodnica is the Pan-European_Corridor_X on which highway A3 Zagreb - Lipovac is located. The Slavonski Brod zapad traffic junction is located in Slobodnica.

The two-tracked Zagreb-Tovarnik railway is located on the route as well.

Slobodnica is also the location of The Police Station of Slavonski Brod.

The tertiary sector of the economy is the most immanent source of income for the inhabitants of Slobodnica, including catering, trade, transportation and tourism. Agriculture (Primary sector has also some importance.

The completion of the Industrial Zone Slobodnica is expected by the end of 2010.
