= Felsőregmec =

- Seal

- Location of Borsod-Abaúj-Zemplén county in Hungary

- Location of Felsőregmec
- Coordinates: 48.49171°N 21.60432°E
- Country: Hungary
- County: Borsod-Abaúj-Zemplén

Area
  - Total: 10.75 km^{2} (4.15 sq mi)

Population (2004)
  - Total: 271
  - Density: 25.2/km^{2} (65/sq mi)
- Time zone: UTC+1 (CET)
  - Summer (DST): UTC+2 (CEST)
- Postal code: 3989
- Area code: 47

Felsőregmec (Slovak: Vyšný Redmec) is a village in the Borsod-Abaúj-Zemplén county in northeastern Hungary.
