= Geoplin =

Slovenian gas company

Geoplin is a natural gas company in Slovenia. The biggest shareholder of the company is Petrol d.d. Ljubljana.

== About the company ==
Geoplin is Slovenia’s largest natural gas trader and one of the most important companies in the Slovenian energy sector, with many years of tradition. Its aim is to remain the leader and continue developing. Geoplin trades and acts as an agent and intermediary on the natural gas market in Slovenia and neighbouring countries.

== Controversy ==
Despite the 2022 Russian invasion of Ukraine, Geoplin continued to purchase natural gas from Gazprom, a Russian state-owned energy company. Critics argue that by continuing to facilitate Russian gas exports, Geoplin indirectly supports Russia's war efforts.
