= Városföld =

Coordinates: 46°49′N 19°46′E

- Interactive map of Városföld
- Country: Hungary
- County: Bács-Kiskun

Area
  - Total: 62.87 km^{2} (24.27 sq mi)

Population (2015)
  - Total: 2,127
  - Density: 34.5/km^{2} (89/sq mi)
- Time zone: UTC+1 (CET)
  - Summer (DST): UTC+2 (CEST)
- Postal code: 6033
- Area code: 76

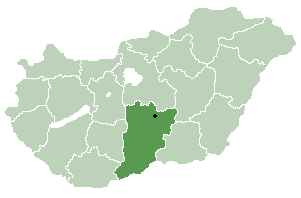
Location of Bács-Kiskun county in Hungary

Városföld is a village in Bács-Kiskun county, in the Southern Great Plain region of southern Hungary.

== Geography ==
It covers an area of 62.87 km^{2} (24 sq mi) and has a population of 2127 people (2015).

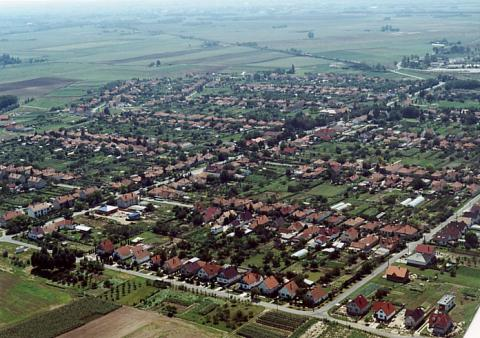
Aerial photography of Városföld
