= Ladánybene =

Coordinates: 47°02′N 19°27′E

- Coat of arms
- Interactive map of Ladánybene
- Country: Hungary
- County: Bács-Kiskun

Area
  - Total: 40.74 km^{2} (15.73 sq mi)

Population (2015)
  - Total: 1,564
  - Density: 38.4/km^{2} (99/sq mi)
- Time zone: UTC+1 (CET)
  - Summer (DST): UTC+2 (CEST)
- Postal code: 6045
- Area code: 76

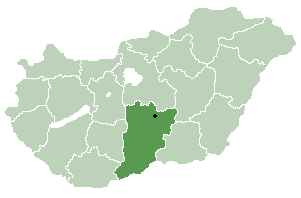
Location of Bács-Kiskun county in Hungary

Ladánybene is a village in Bács-Kiskun county, in the Southern Great Plain region of southern Hungary. Few Jews lived in the village until they were murdered in the Holocaust in 1944.

== Geography ==
It covers an area of 40.74 km^{2} (16 sq mi) and has a population of 1564 people (2015).
