= Felsőlajos =

- Location in Hungary
- Coordinates: 47°03′56″N 19°29′46″E
- Country: Hungary
- County: Bács-Kiskun

Area
  - Total: 11.41 km^{2} (4.41 sq mi)

Population (2015)
  - Total: 864
  - Density: 75.7/km^{2} (196/sq mi)
- Time zone: UTC+1 (CET)
  - Summer (DST): UTC+2 (CEST)
- Postal code: 6055
- Area code: 76

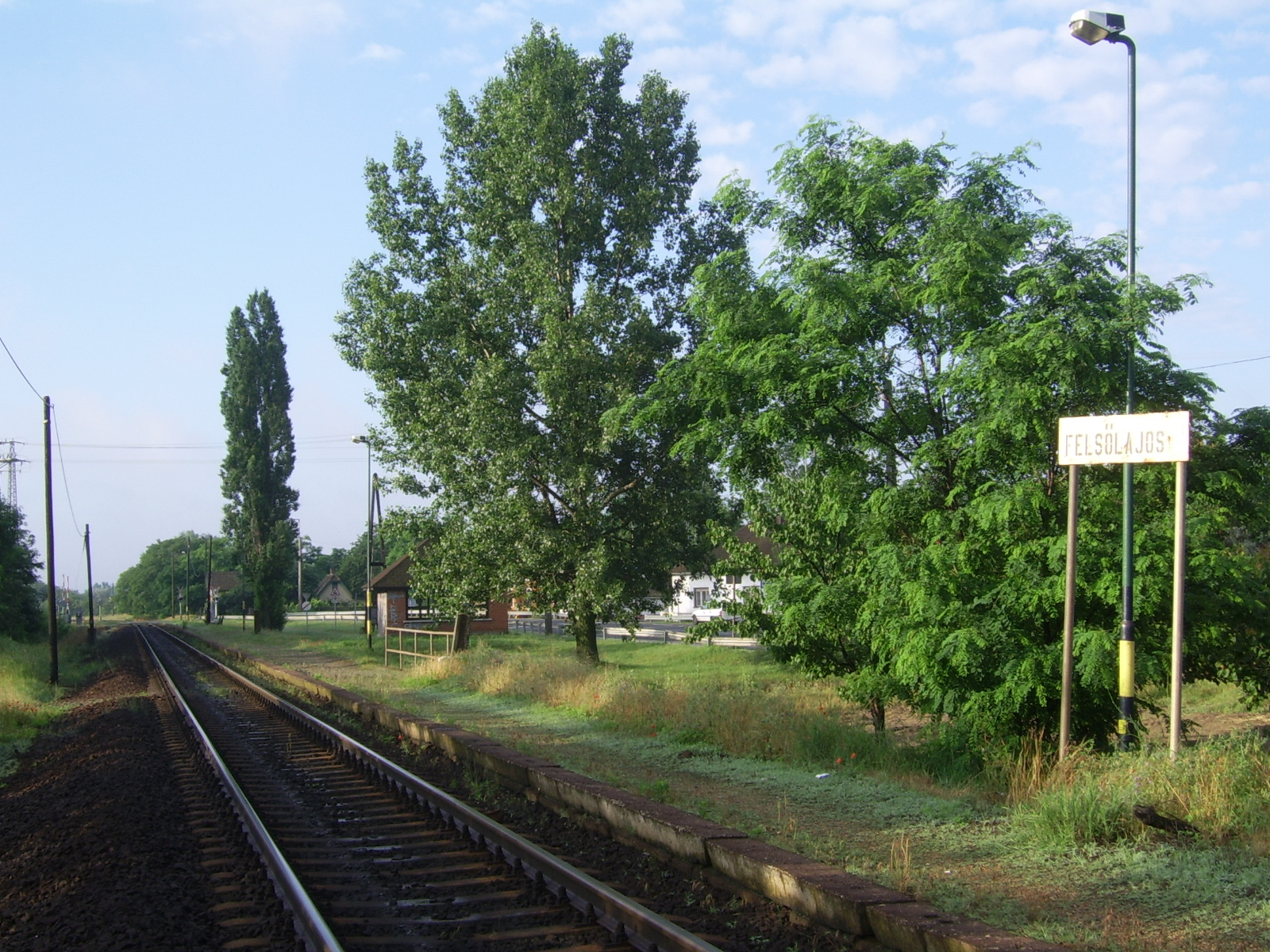
Felsőlajos train stop, Felsőlajos, Hungary

Felsőlajos is a village in Bács-Kiskun county, in the Southern Great Plain region of Hungary.

== Geography ==
It covers an area of 11.41 km^{2} (4 sq mi) and has a population of 864 people (2015).
