= Southern Great Plain =

Southern Great Plain Dél-Alföld
- Region
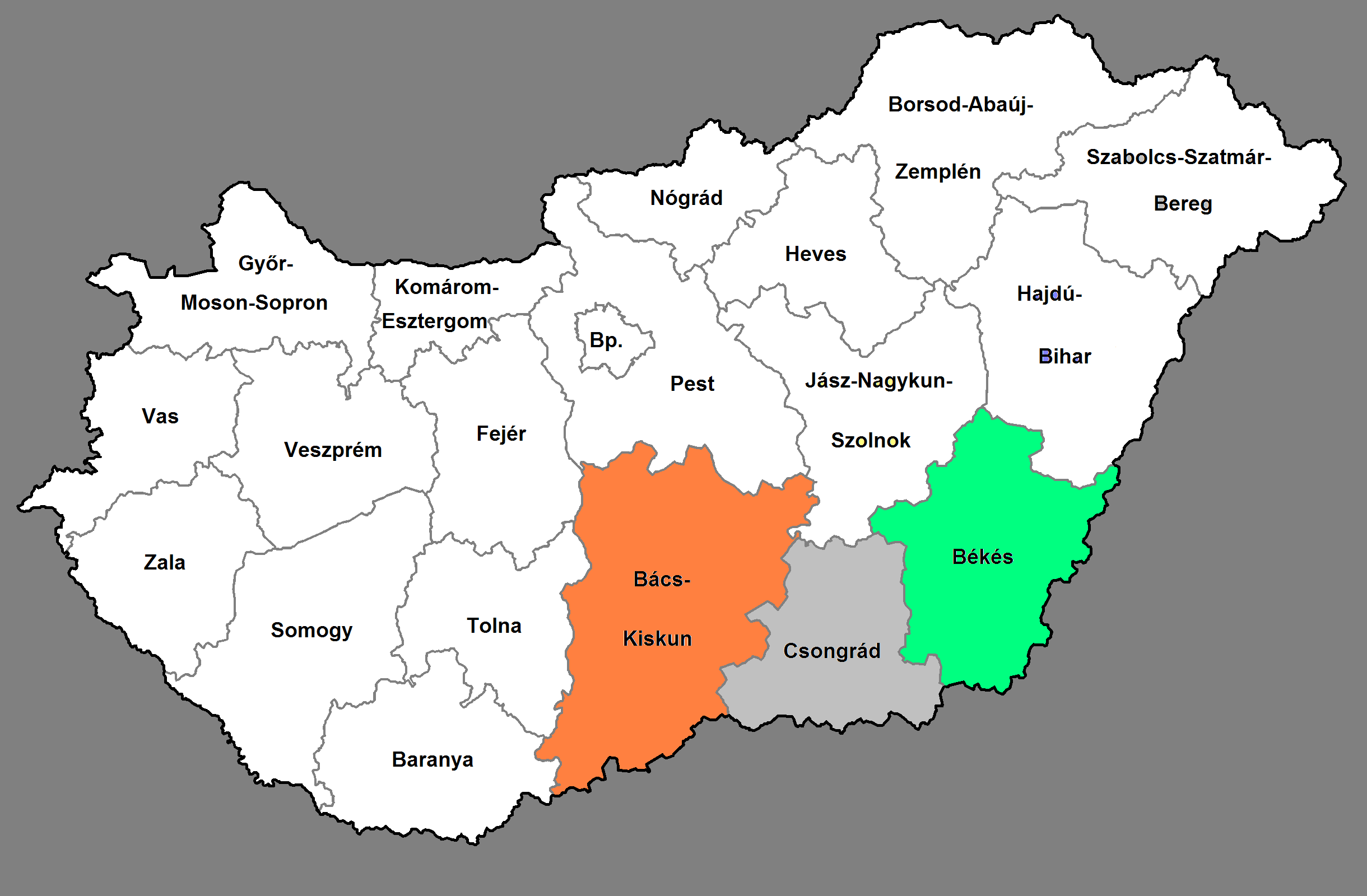
- Country: Hungary
- Capital city: Szeged

Area
  - Total: 18,339 km^{2} (7,081 sq mi)

Population
  - Total: 1,334,506
  - Density: 73/km^{2} (190/sq mi)
- Time zone: UTC+1 (CET)
  - Summer (DST): UTC+2 (CEST)
- NUTS code: HU33
- GDP per capita (PPS): €14,500 (2017)
- HDI (2019): 0.849 very high · 3rd

The Southern Great Plain (Hungarian: Dél-Alföld ['deːl 'ɒlføld]) is a statistical (NUTS 2) region of Hungary. It is part of Great Plain and North (NUTS 1) region. The Southern Great Plain includes the counties of Bács-Kiskun, Békés, and Csongrád-Csanád. The region is in the southern part of Hungary. It borders Central Hungary and the Northern Great Plain regions to the north, Romania to the east, Serbia to the south, and the Southern Transdanubia and Central Transdanubia regions to the west. The regional centre, and capital city is Szeged, the third largest city of Hungary.

== See also ==
- List of regions of Hungary
