= Csongrád-Csanád County 2nd constituency =

Constituency in Hungary (2012-)

Csongrád-Csanád County 2nd constituency (Szeged)
- Constituency for the National Assembly
- Location of Csongrád-Csanád county 02 within Csongrád-Csanád county

- Location of Csongrád-Csanád county within Hungary
- County: Csongrád-Csanád
- Electorate: 86,558 (2018)
- Major settlements: Szeged

Current constituency
- Created: 2011 (modified 2024)
- Party: Tisza Party
- Member: Attila Gajda
- Elected: 2026

The 2nd constituency of Csongrád-Csanád County (Hungarian: Csongrád-Csanád megyei 02. számú országgyűlési egyéni választókerület) is one of the single member constituencies of the National Assembly, the national legislature of Hungary. The constituency standard abbreviation: Csongrád-Csanád 02. OEVK.

Since 2026, it has been represented by Attila Gajda of the Tisza Party.

== Geography ==
The 2nd constituency is located in south-western part of Csongrád-Csanád County.

=== List of municipalities ===
The constituency includes the following municipalities:

1. Ásotthalom
2. Bordány
3. Deszk
4. Domaszék
5. Forráskút
6. Kübekháza
7. Mórahalom
8. Öttömös
9. Pusztamérges
10. Röszke
11. Ruzsa
12. Szeged: Southern part of the city.
13. Tiszasziget
14. Újszentiván
15. Üllés
16. Zsombó
17. Zákányszék

== Members ==
The constituency was first represented by László B. Nagy of the Fidesz from 2014 to 2022. He was succeeded by Béla Mihálffy of the KDNP in 2022. In the 2026 election, Attila Gajda of the Tisza Party was elected representative.

Election	Member	Party	%	Ref.
2014	László B. Nagy	Fidesz	43.85	
2018	László B. Nagy	Fidesz	44.62	
2022	Béla Mihálffy	KDNP	45.29	
2026	Attila Gajda	Tisza Party	56.64	

== Results ==
2026 parliamentary election: Csongrád-Csanád - 2nd constituency
Party	Candidate	Votes	%	±%
Tisza	Attila Gajda	33,069	55.55	New
Fidesz–KDNP	Béla Mihálffy	19,372	32.54	−12.79
Mi Hazánk	László Toroczkai	5,999	10.08	+0.26
MKKP	Ivett Sipos	576	0.97	−4.09
DK	István Óhidy	516	0.87	As EM
Majority		13,697	23.01	
Turnout		59,532	81.74	▲10.06
Registered electors		72,828		
Tisza gain from Fidesz–KDNP		Swing	+68.34	
