= Mórahalom District =

Coordinates: 46.2167°N 19.8833°E

Mórahalom District Mórahalmi járás
- Districts of Hungary
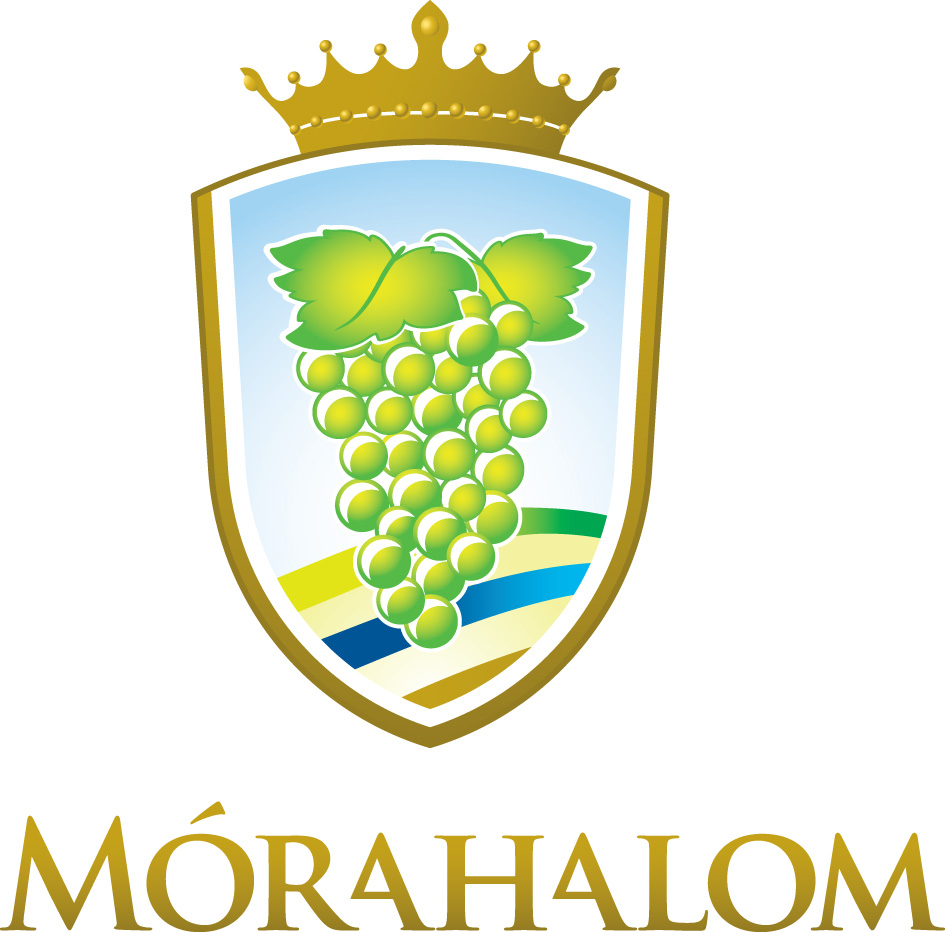
- Coat of arms

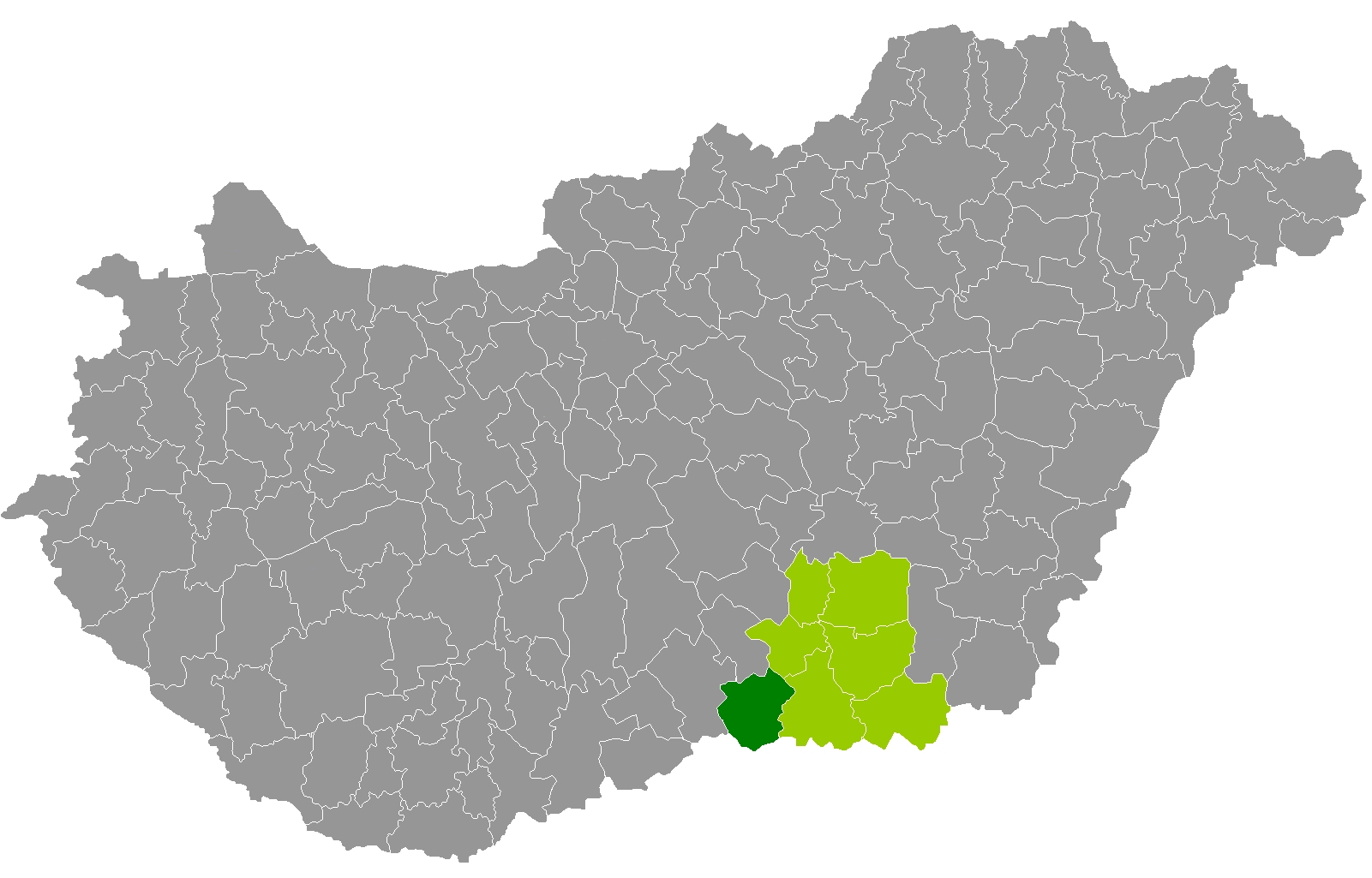
- Mórahalom District within Hungary and Csongrád County.
- Country: Hungary
- County: Csongrád
- District seat: Mórahalom

Area
  - Total: 561.71 km^{2} (216.88 sq mi)
  - Rank: 5th in Csongrád

Population (2011 census)
  - Total: 28,986
  - Rank: 5th in Csongrád
  - Density: 52/km^{2} (130/sq mi)

Mórahalom (Hungarian: Mórahalmi járás) is a district in south-western part of Csongrád County. Mórahalom is also the name of the town where the district seat is found. The district is located in the Southern Great Plain Statistical Region.

== Geography ==
Mórahalom District borders with Kiskunmajsa District (Bács-Kiskun County) and Kistelek District to the north, Szeged District to the east, the Serbian district of North Bačka to the south, Kiskunhalas District (Bács-Kiskun County) to the west. The number of the inhabited places in Mórahalom District is 10.

== Municipalities ==
The district has 1 town and 9 villages. (ordered by population, as of 1 January 2012)

- Ásotthalom (3,986)
- Bordány (3,262)
- Forráskút (2,366)
- **Mórahalom** (6,067) – district seat
- Öttömös (698)
- Pusztamérges (1,227)
- Ruzsa (2,522)
- Üllés (3,142)
- Zákányszék (2,743)
- Zsombó (3,552)

The bolded municipality is the city.

== Demographics ==
Religion in Mórahalom District (2011 census)
1. Catholic Church (65.3%)
2. Greek Catholicism (0.20%)
3. Calvinism (2.30%)
4. Lutheranism (0.30%)
5. Orthodoxy (0.10%)
6. Other religions (1.50%)
7. Non-religious (9.50%)
8. Atheists (0.80%)
9. Undeclared (20.0%)

In 2011, it had a population of 28,986 and the population density was 52/km^{2}.

Year	County population	Change
2011	28,986	n/a

=== Ethnicity ===
Besides the Hungarian majority, the main minorities are the Romanian (approx. 200), German (150) and Serb (100).

Total population (2011 census): 28,986
Ethnic groups (2011 census): Identified themselves: 26,831 persons:

- Hungarians: 26,127 (97.38%)
- Others and indefinable: 704 (2.62%)

Approx. 2,000 persons in Mórahalom District did not declare their ethnic group at the 2011 census.

=== Religion ===
Religious adherence in the county according to 2011 census:

- Catholic – 18,988 (Roman Catholic – 18,942; Greek Catholic – 44);
- Reformed – 666;
- Evangelical – 75;
- Orthodox – 42;
- other religions – 425;
- Non-religious – 2,762;
- Atheism – 228;
- Undeclared – 5,800.

== Gallery ==
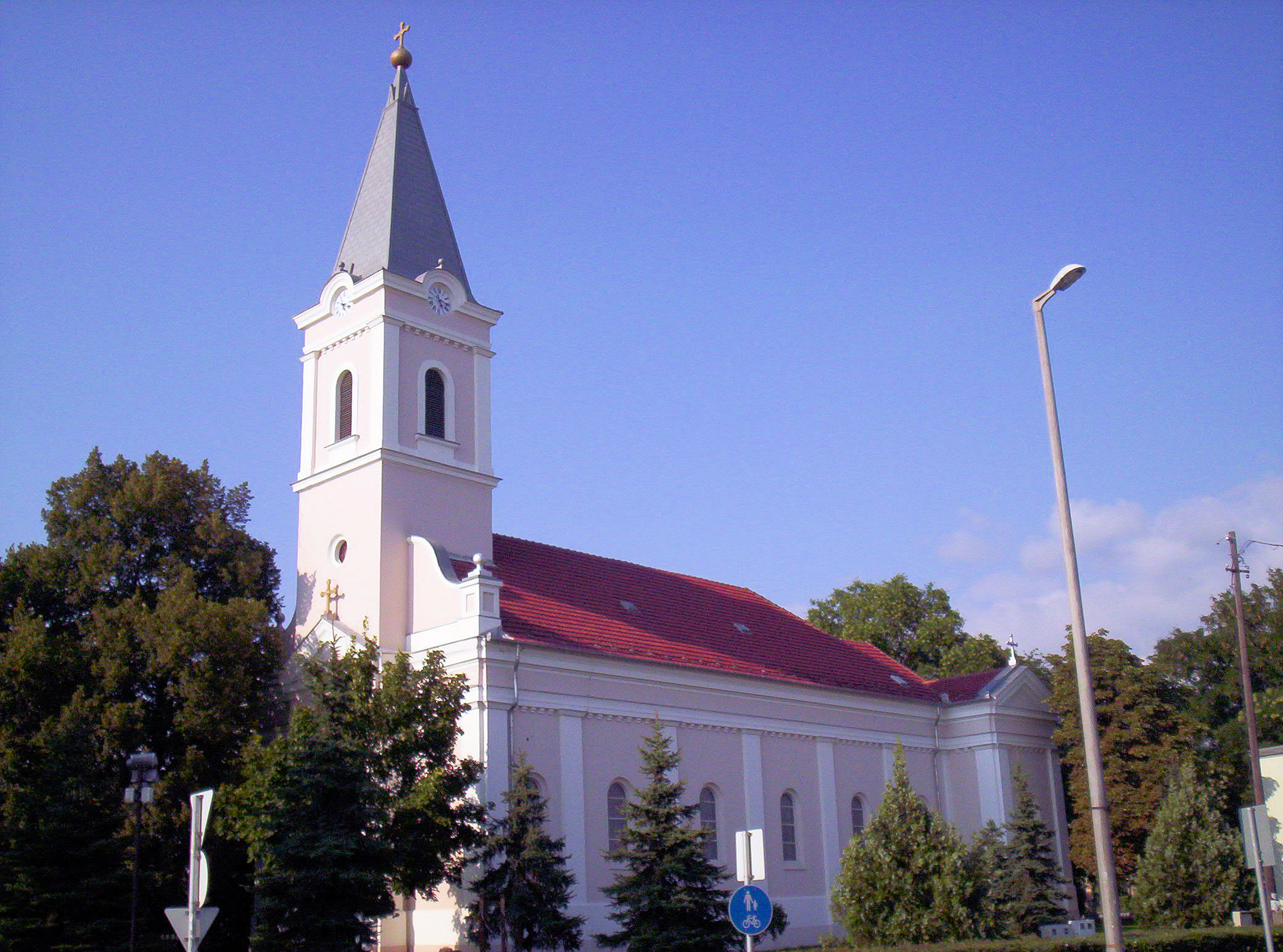
Mórahalom, the district seat

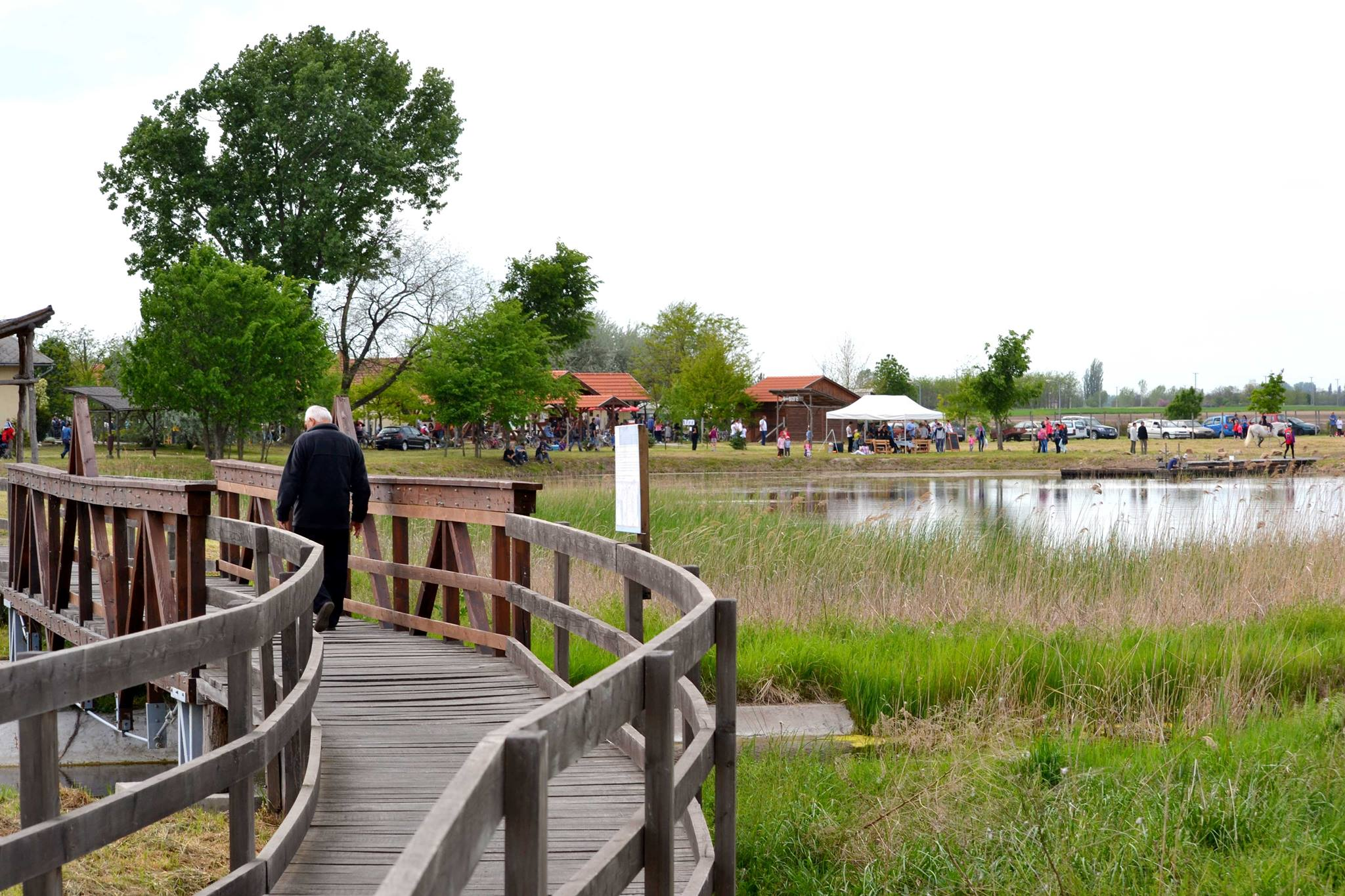
Nagyszéksós-tó near Mórahalom

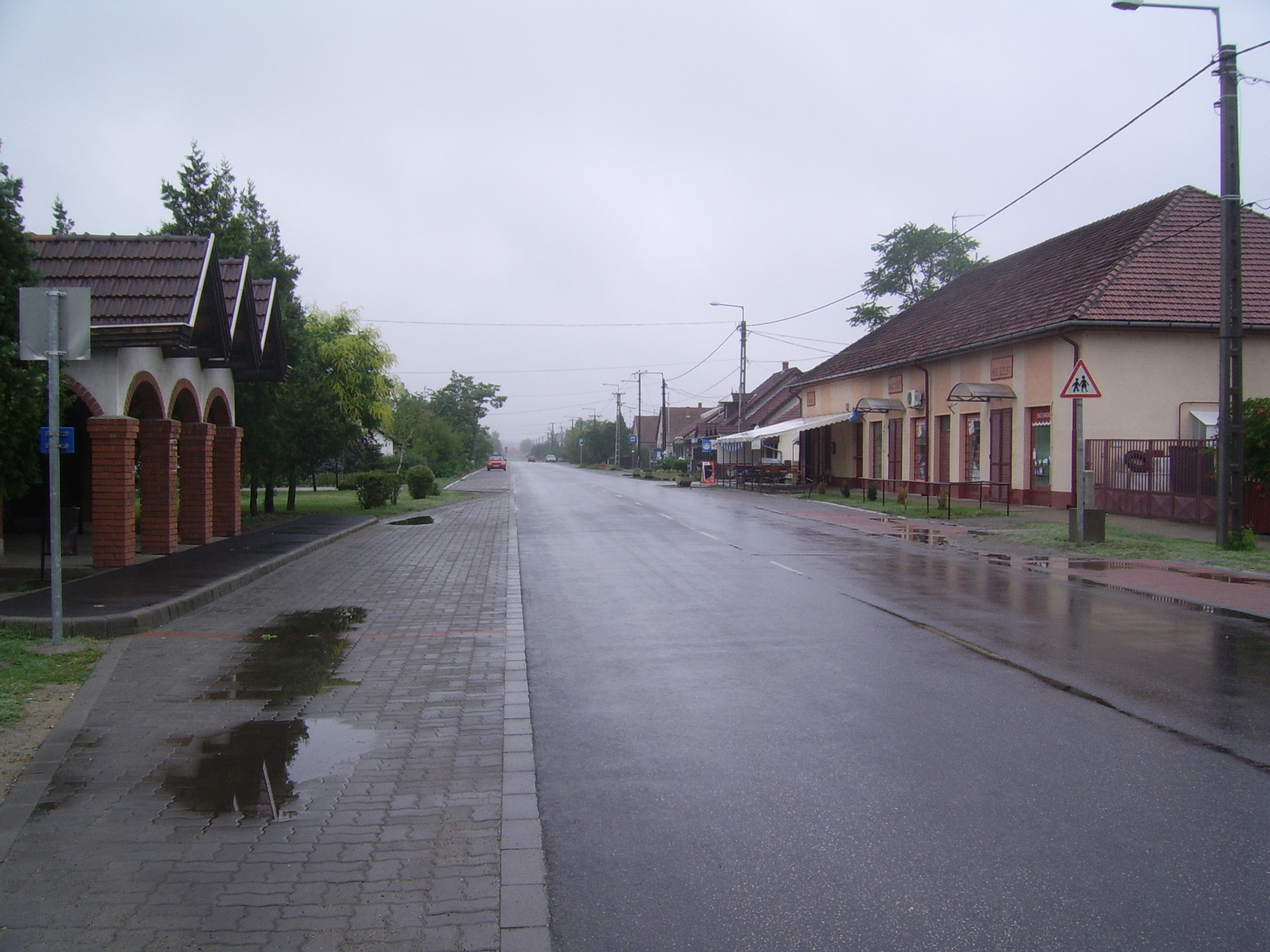
View of Ruzsa

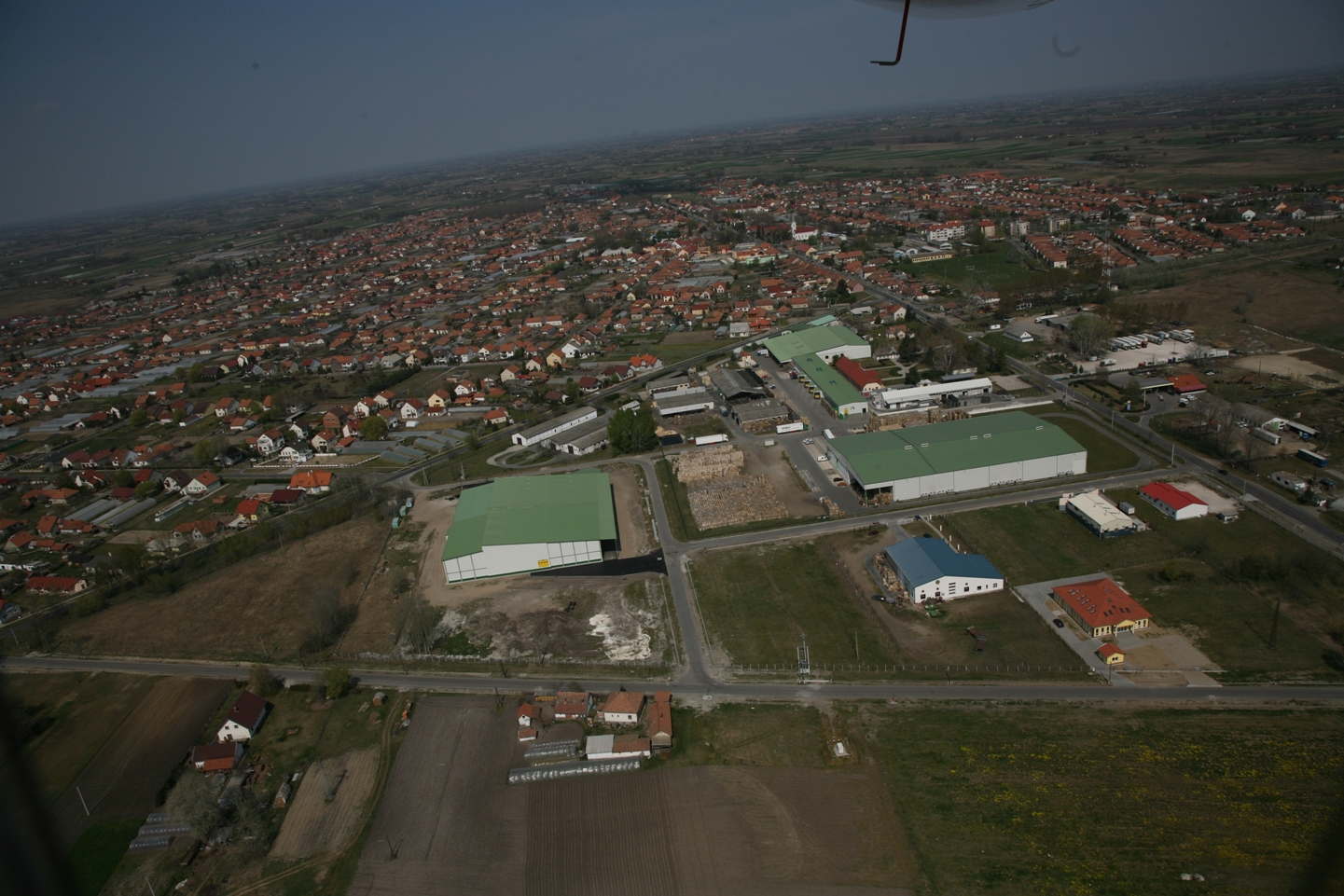
Aerial view of Mórahalom

== See also ==
- List of cities and towns of Hungary
