= Pál Gyömbér =

Executed Hungarian serial killer

- Born: November 7, 1859; Csanytelek, Kingdom of Hungary
- Died: April 2, 1890 (aged 30); Csillag Prison, Szeged, Kingdom of Hungary
- Cause of death: Execution by hanging
- Convictions: Murder x5 Attempted murder x3
- Penalty: Death

Details
- Victims: 5
- Span of crimes: February – November 1888
- Country: Hungary
- State: Csongrád-Csanád
- Date apprehended: April 17, 1889

Pál Gyömbér (November 7, 1859 – April 2, 1890) was a Hungarian serial killer who killed five people and attempted to kill three others in the Great Plains area from 1888 to 1889, in order to steal money and give it to his sweetheart. He would later be convicted, sentenced to death and hanged for his crimes.

== Early life ==
Pál Gyömbér was born on November 7, 1859, to a poor family in Csanytelek, the illegitimate child of an unmarried woman named Ágnes Gyömbér. His early life is poorly documented, but according to court records, he never attended school, was illiterate and jobless. Gyömbér himself would later claim that he grew up in an unloving environment, moving from homestead to homestead, and had lived in Kunszentmárton for four years. Despite these circumstances, his friends described him as a hard worker who refused to drink and gamble.

For approximately five years, Gyömbér had been courting a girl from Mindszent named Erzsébet Pap. While she reciprocated his feelings, he found it difficult to make a living from normal work, and so Gyömbér started committing minor crimes, for which he would be arrested and sent to prison. During one of his prison stints, he was "educated" by Pál Besenyei, a member of Sándor Rózsa's outlaw gang, who told him that no witnesses should be left for his crimes and that he should not use any accomplices. Utilizing this knowledge, he set out to commit much more serious crimes after his release.

=== Murders ===
On February 19, 1888, Gyömbér knocked on the door of the elderly Förgeteg couple, who were living in Öregszőlő, near Csongrád. They allowed him to stay for the night, but at dawn the following morning, he attacked the man with a stick, then beat his blind wife with a chair. Bálint Förgeteg later succumbed to his injuries, but his wife survived. On February 29, he went to Szentes, as he had heard that an old woman named Borbála Bálasz had a stash of 300 forints with which she planned to open a pub. He was let in to stay for the night, but after the woman went to sleep, Gyömbér took a dilapidated axe and killed her. He then ransacked the apartment, finding 280 forints, but being illiterate, he was unable to understand what it said and threw them away. He only took jewelry, which he later gave to his future bride as a gift. Meanwhile, authorities had arrested a local named István Pethő for Bálasz's murder, who remained in prison for a month before being released.

On the night of November 10–11, the drunken Gyömbér was returning home to Kiskunhalas, but on the way stopped at a pub in Kistelek, operated by the Tisóczky couple. Guessing that he could find loot amounting to 300-500 forints, he entered the pub only to find István Tisóczky drunk himself. He requested accommodation at the pub, and while the elderly man was preparing his bed, Gyömbér took an axe and killed him, before turning towards his wife Rozalia to demand money. She refused, so he proceeded to kill her as well. In order to cover his tracks, Gyömbér rearranged the scene, taking out plates and pots to make it look like there had been multiple perpetrators, before looting the pub. He later gave some of the stolen garments to his fiancée and mother-in-law.

On the afternoon of November 27, Gyömbér and Pap were set to be married on the following day. On the way, however, he went to the farm of Vincze Rókus, which was on the outskirts of Szentes, and attacked the woman with his axe. Before he could kill her, the axe's head broke off the handle and became unusable, prompting Gyömbér to grab a manger hanging from the wall and finish off Rókus. He then put the woman's body back in the bed and covered it, before stealing 25 forints, a pair of boots and a suit, before closing the door and leaving. The deceased's body was later found by family members who were returning from field work. During the investigation, the gendarmes suspected her husband and a neighboring farmer had been the killers, from whom they forcibly extracted confessions. Gyömbér quickly washed himself, and on the day of his wedding, he went with the stolen clothes and boots, and the honorarium for the ceremony with the 25 forints he had taken from the farm.

After his marriage, Gyömbér singled out Lénit Lévi, who ran a pub in Szentes, as a potential victim. On December 17, he entered the pub and then hit her with the axe. However, Lévi retaliated and bit him on the finger. Frightened off by the bite and the appearance of the woman's husband, Gyömbér fled the scene and hid in a dark ditch, where he stayed for the night. His next two offenses were thefts, committed on December 23, 1888, and March 3, 1889, respectively.

The last known attempted robbery occurred on the night of April 17, 1889. Gyömbér, who had weaved a jug out of black locust, attacked a grandmother named Istvánne Fazekas at her homestead in Szegvár. He knocked the old woman down and cut her face with a knife, demanding food and money from her. After being told where to find, he ransacked the homestead and fled the village. Fazekas was found alive, and the granddaughter, who had seen in which direction the perpetrator had fled, told her male relatives, who went after him. They went to the outskirts of Szegvár, where they caught Gyömbér while he was trying to throw himself down a well, holding him down until authorities had arrived. Upon doing so, he was arrested and transported to the Csillag Prison in Szeged.

=== Trial, sentence and execution ===
Gyömbér's trial took place at a court in Szeged in August 1889, with the royal prosecutor's office charging him with fivefold murder, three attempted murders and thefts. At the beginning, believing that he could get away with a light sentence of one or two years imprisonment, Gyömbér cockily admitted and detailed each and every single one of the crimes, and much to the shock of the audience and the court, emphasized that he had gone in with the sole intent of killing his victims. He only showed emotion when his wife arrived, explaining that he had hidden his criminal ways from her to make it appear that his gallant gifts were the result of his hard work.

His only apparent show of remose was when the judge told him that his wife denounced his actions and was angry at him. Due to his boastful attitude of committing crimes that would result in a death sentence as per contemporary law, his defense counsel had no choice but to ask for life imprisonment, citing their client's supposed mental illness. However, this notion was rejected because of Gyömbér's detailed confessions and attitude during the trial, and on August 13, 1889, he was found guilty on all charges and sentenced to hang in March 1890, but his execution would later be delayed. He unsuccessfully attempted to appeal his sentence, and on April 2, 1890, he was hanged at the Csillag Prison. His body was later buried in the prison cemetery next to the road in Dorozsma, near Szeged. Following his execution, according to contemporary customs, the court auctioned off the murder weapons.

== In culture ==
The contradiction stemming from the acts of a cold-blooded murderer and the romantic love Gyömbér showed towards his wife piqued the interest of Hungarian society at the time. In the surrounding towns, his picture was sold on the street, and poetic tarpaulin booklets describing his deeds were handed out. Writer Géza Gárdonyi published poems about him, and peasants from the countryside included him in songs and murder ballads.

== See also ==
- List of serial killers by country
