= Gyömbér =

Gyömbér is a Hungarian surname meaning "ginger". Notable people with the name include:

- Gábor Gyömbér (born 1988), Hungarian footballer
- Norbert Gyömbér (born 1992), Slovak footballer
- Pál Gyömbér (1859–1890), Hungarian serial killer
