= Ferencszállás =

Coordinates: 46°13′N 20°21′E

- Village
- Coat of arms
- Interactive map of Ferencszállás
- Country: Hungary
- County: Csongrád

Area
  - Total: 5.79 km^{2} (2.24 sq mi)

Population (2015)
  - Total: 605
  - Density: 104.5/km^{2} (271/sq mi)
- Time zone: UTC+1 (CET)
  - Summer (DST): UTC+2 (CEST)
- Postal code: 6774
- Area code: 62

Ferencszállás is a village in the Szeged District of Csongrád county, in the Southern Great Plain region of southern Hungary.

== Geography ==
It covers an area of 5.79 km^{2} (2 sq mi) and has a population of 605 people (2015). The village is accessible via Hungary's Highway 43. The town lies along the river Maros, 10.5 kilometers west of Makó.

== History ==
The village of Ferencszállás was founded in 1828 by the Hungarian baron Gerliczy Ferenc (1748-1833), from whom its name derives. Ferencszállás is located on a plain once known as "Kukutyin puszta", which was the site of tobacco drying barns between 1810 and 1814.
