= Szeged District =

Coordinates: 46.2500°N 20.1667°E

Szeged District Szegedi járás
- Districts of Hungary
- Coat of arms

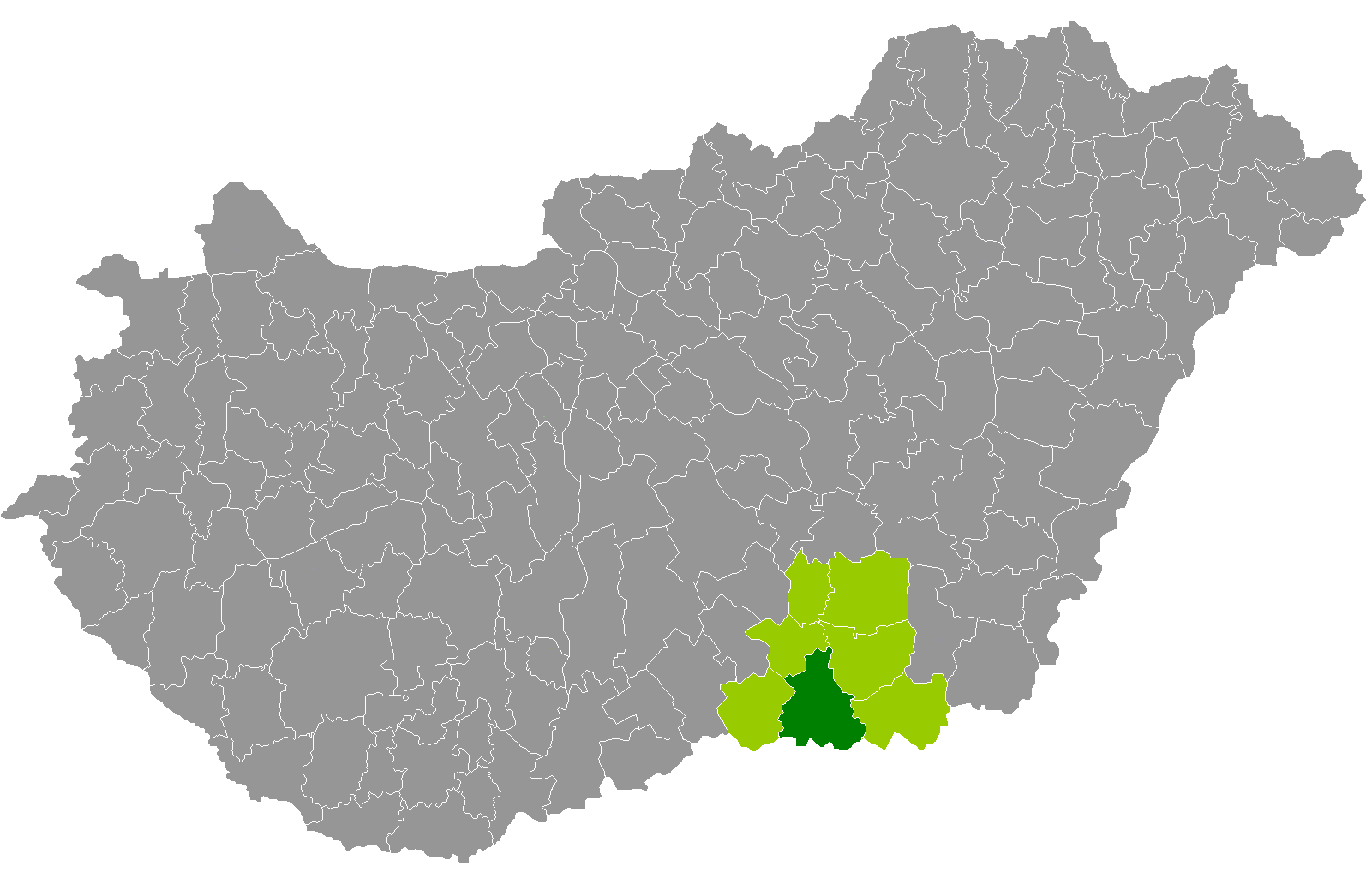
- Szeged District within Hungary and Csongrád County.
- Country: Hungary
- County: Csongrád
- District seat: Szeged

Area
  - Total: 741.10 km^{2} (286.14 sq mi)
  - Rank: 2nd in Csongrád

Population (2019 census)
  - Total: 197,615
  - Rank: 1st in Csongrád
  - Density: 276/km^{2} (710/sq mi)

Szeged (Hungarian: Szegedi járás; Serbian: Сегедински округ, romanized: Segedinski okrug; German: Kreis Szegedin) is a district in southern part of Csongrád County. Szeged is also the name of the town where the district seat is found. The district is located in the Southern Great Plain Statistical Region.

== Geography ==
Szeged District borders with Kistelek District to the northwest, Hódmezővásárhely District to the northeast, Makó District to the east, the Serbian districts of North Banat to the east and North Bačka to the south, Mórahalom District to the west. The number of the inhabited places in Szeged District is 13.

== Municipalities ==
The district has 1 urban county, 1 town, 1 large village and 10 villages. (ordered by population, as of 1 January 2012)

- Algyő (5,251)
- Deszk (3,644)
- Dóc (765)
- Domaszék (4,974)
- Ferencszállás (615)
- Klárafalva (476)
- Kübekháza (1,488)
- Röszke (3,176)
- **Sándorfalva** (7,953)
- Szatymaz (4,674)
- **Szeged** (170,052) – district and county seat
- Tiszasziget (1,751)
- Újszentiván (1,786)

The bolded municipalities are cities, italics municipality is large village.

== Demographics ==
Religion in Szeged District (2011 census)
1. Catholic Church (38.6%)
2. Greek Catholicism (0.40%)
3. Calvinism (4.60%)
4. Lutheranism (1.00%)
5. Orthodoxy (0.20%)
6. Other religions (2.20%)
7. Non-religious (20.8%)
8. Atheists (2.10%)
9. Undeclared (30.1%)

In 2011, it had a population of 204,263 and the population density was 276/km².

Year	County population	Change
2011	204,263	n/a

=== Ethnicity ===
Besides the Hungarian majority, the main minorities are the Roma (approx. 2,000), Serb and German (1,700), Romanian (750), Slovak (400), Croat (300), Russian and Arab (200), Polish (150), Chinese, Bulgarian, Ukrainian, Greek and Armenian (100).

Total population (2011 census): 204,263
Ethnic groups (2011 census): Identified themselves: 183,577 persons:

- Hungarians: 172,834 (94.15%)
- Gypsies: 1,932 (1.05%)
- Others and indefinable: 8,811 (4.80%)

Approx. 21,000 persons in Szeged District did not declare their ethnic group at the 2011 census.

=== Religion ===
Religious adherence in the county according to 2011 census:

- Catholic – 79,614 (Roman Catholic – 78,826; Greek Catholic – 762);
- Reformed – 9,328;
- Evangelical – 2,105;
- Orthodox – 457;
- other religions – 4,533;
- Non-religious – 42,459;
- Atheism – 4,187;
- Undeclared – 61,580.

== Gallery ==
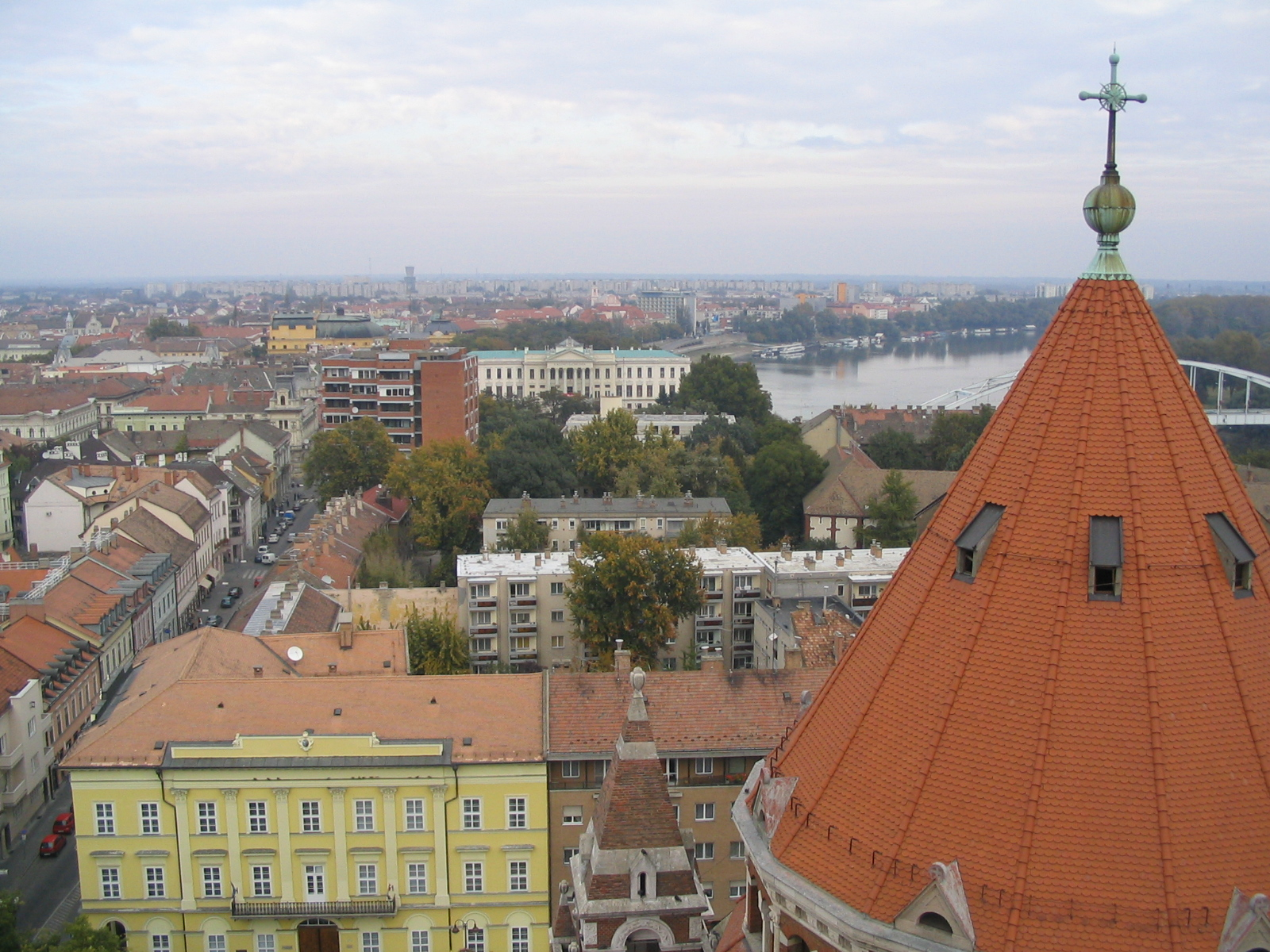
Szeged, the Sunniest city in Hungary

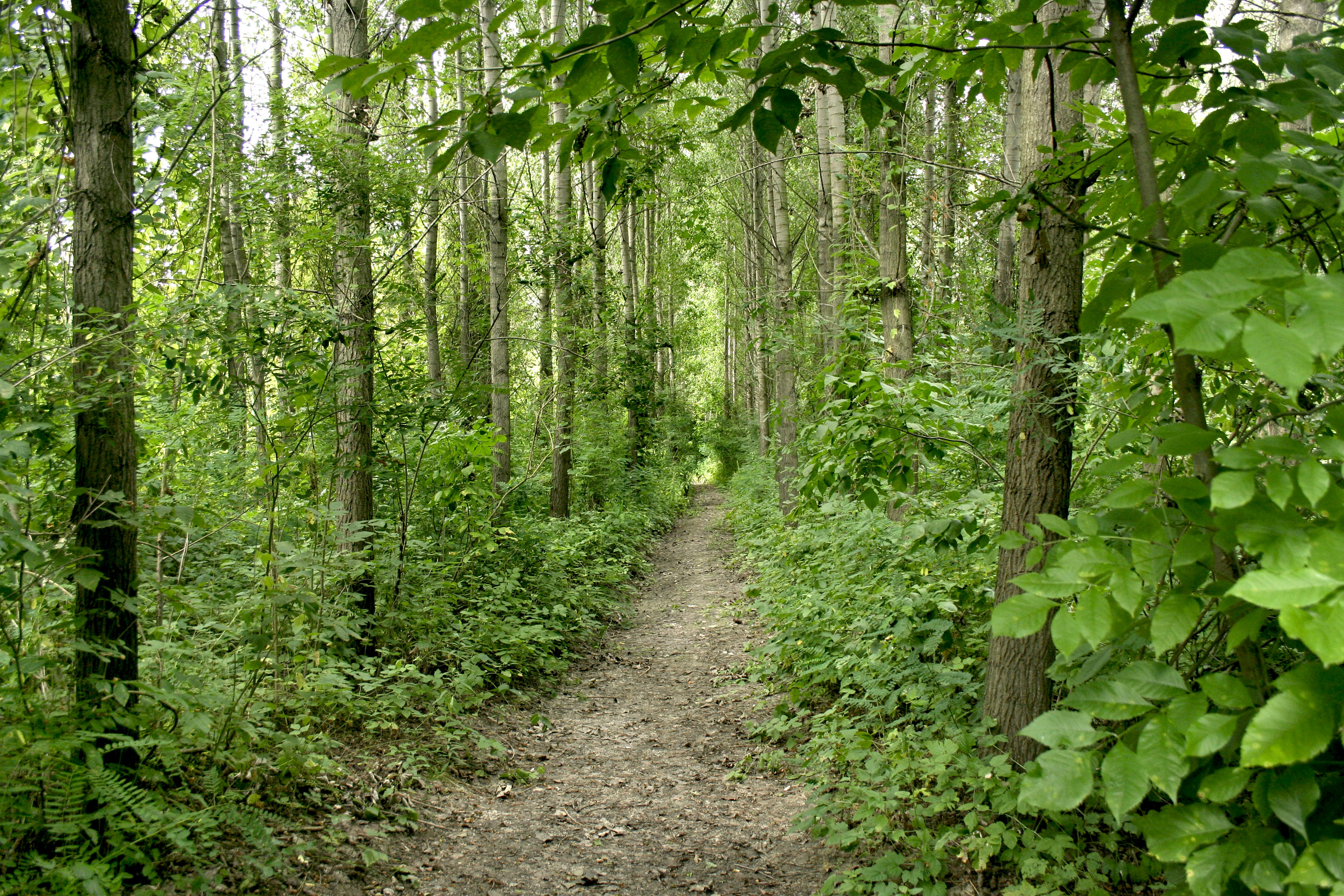
Artificially planted forest near Algyő (Tisza river)

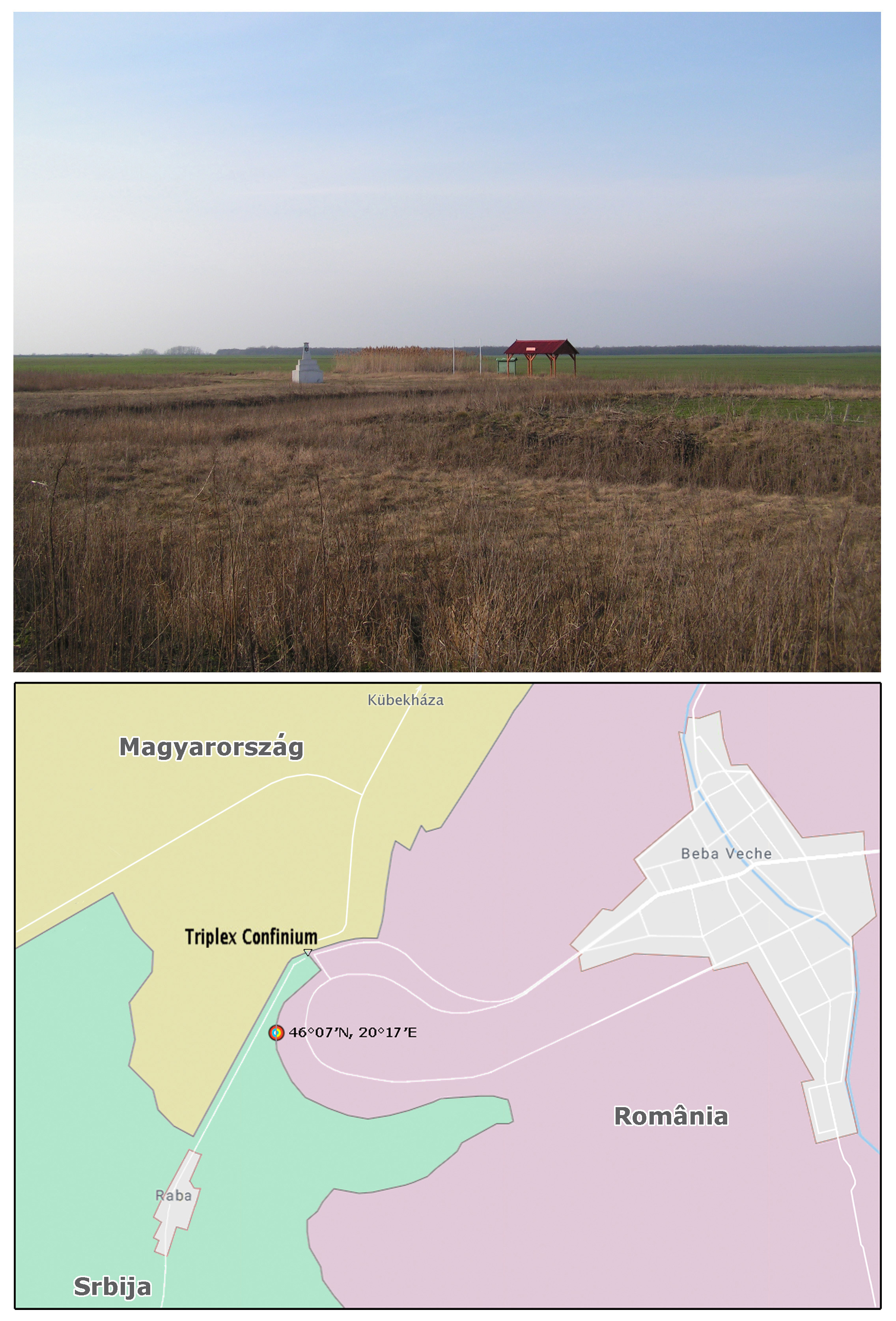
Triplex Confinium near Kübekháza

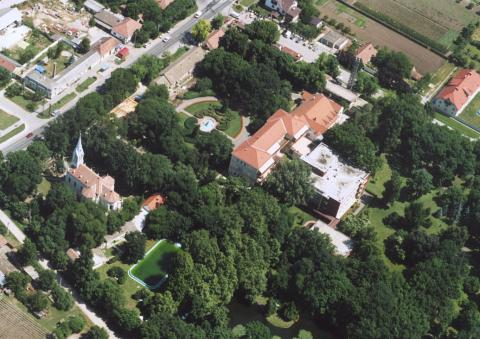
Gerliczy Mansion in Deszk

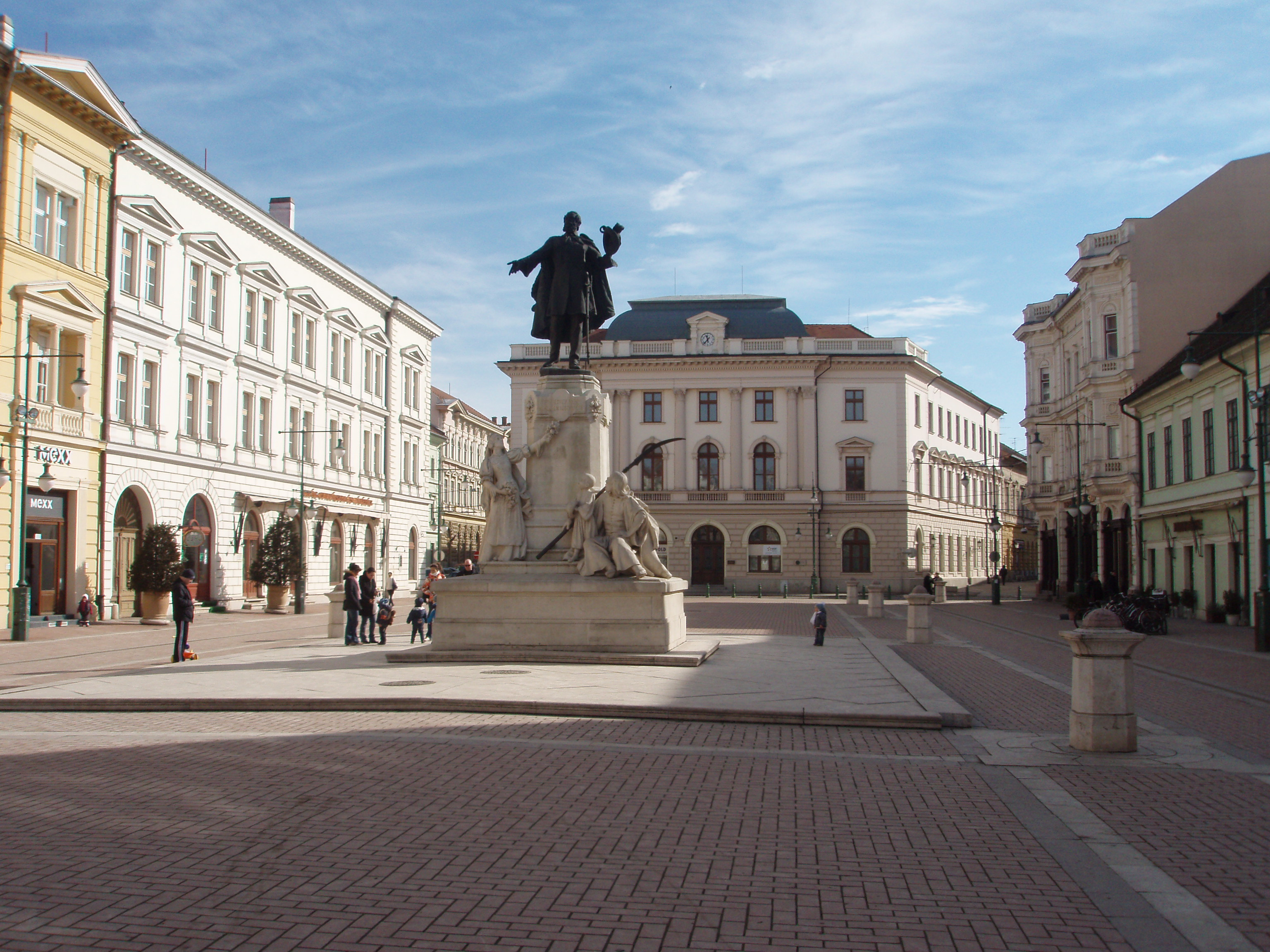
Downtown of Szeged

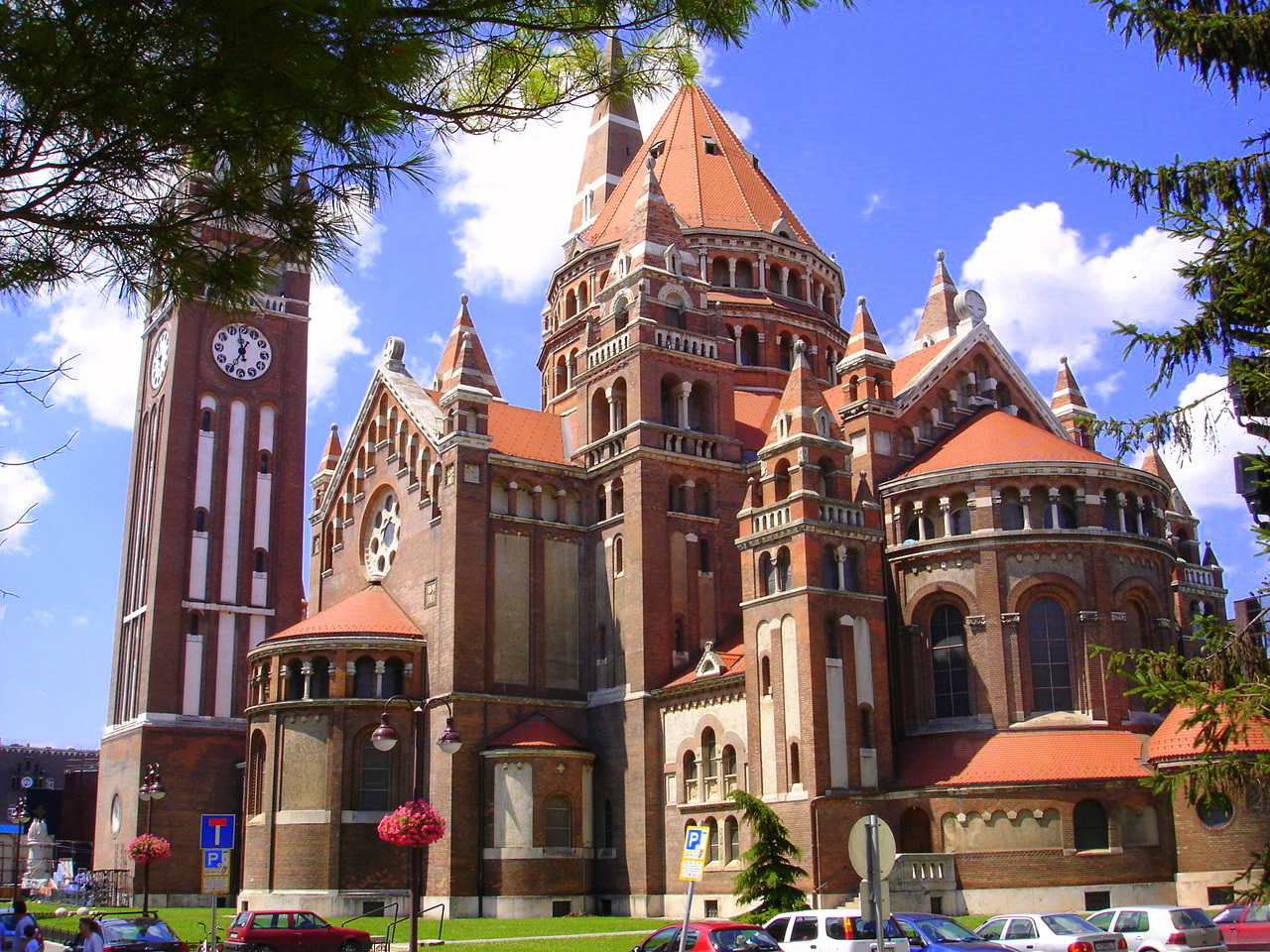
Szeged Cathedral

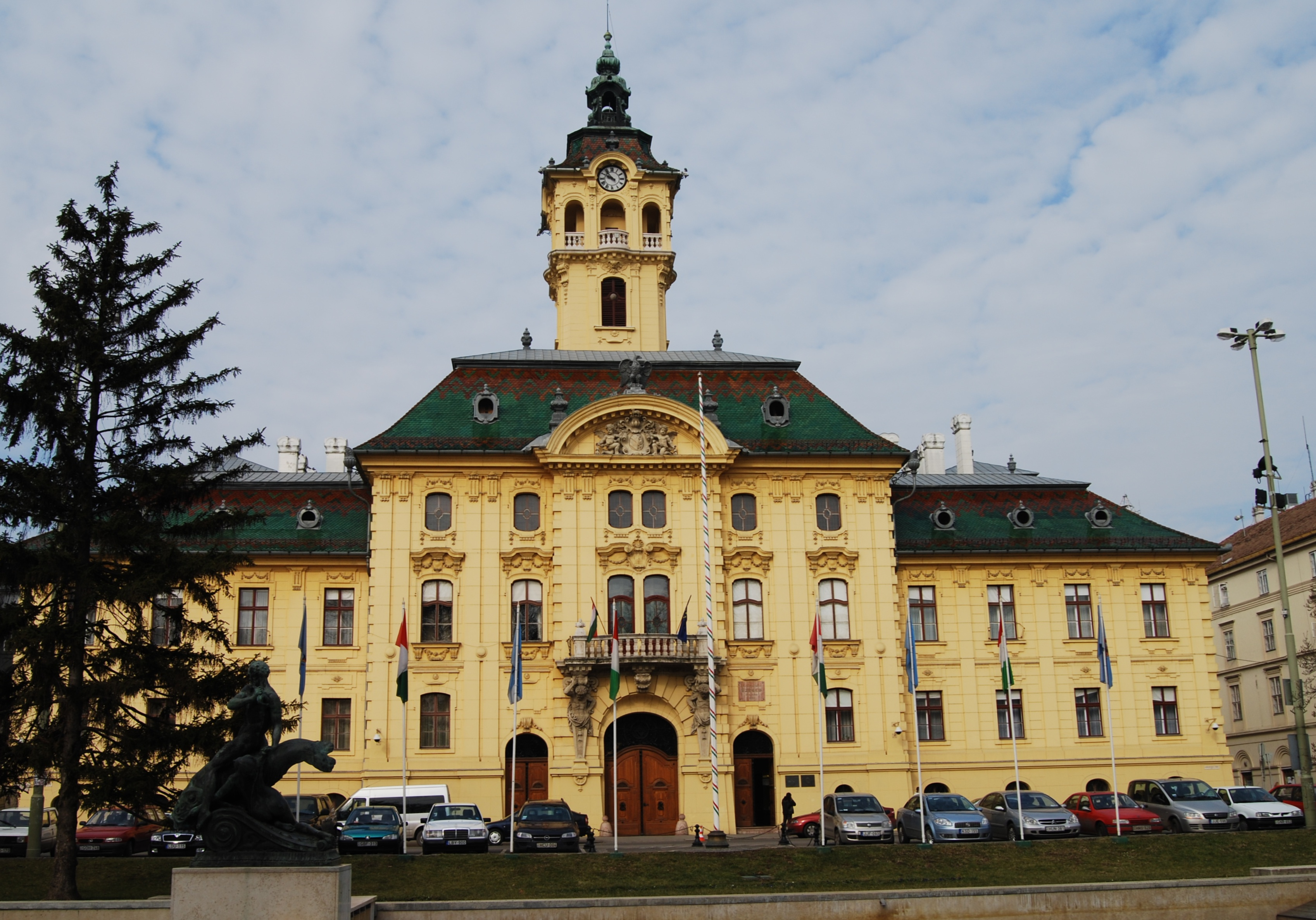
Town Hall in Szeged

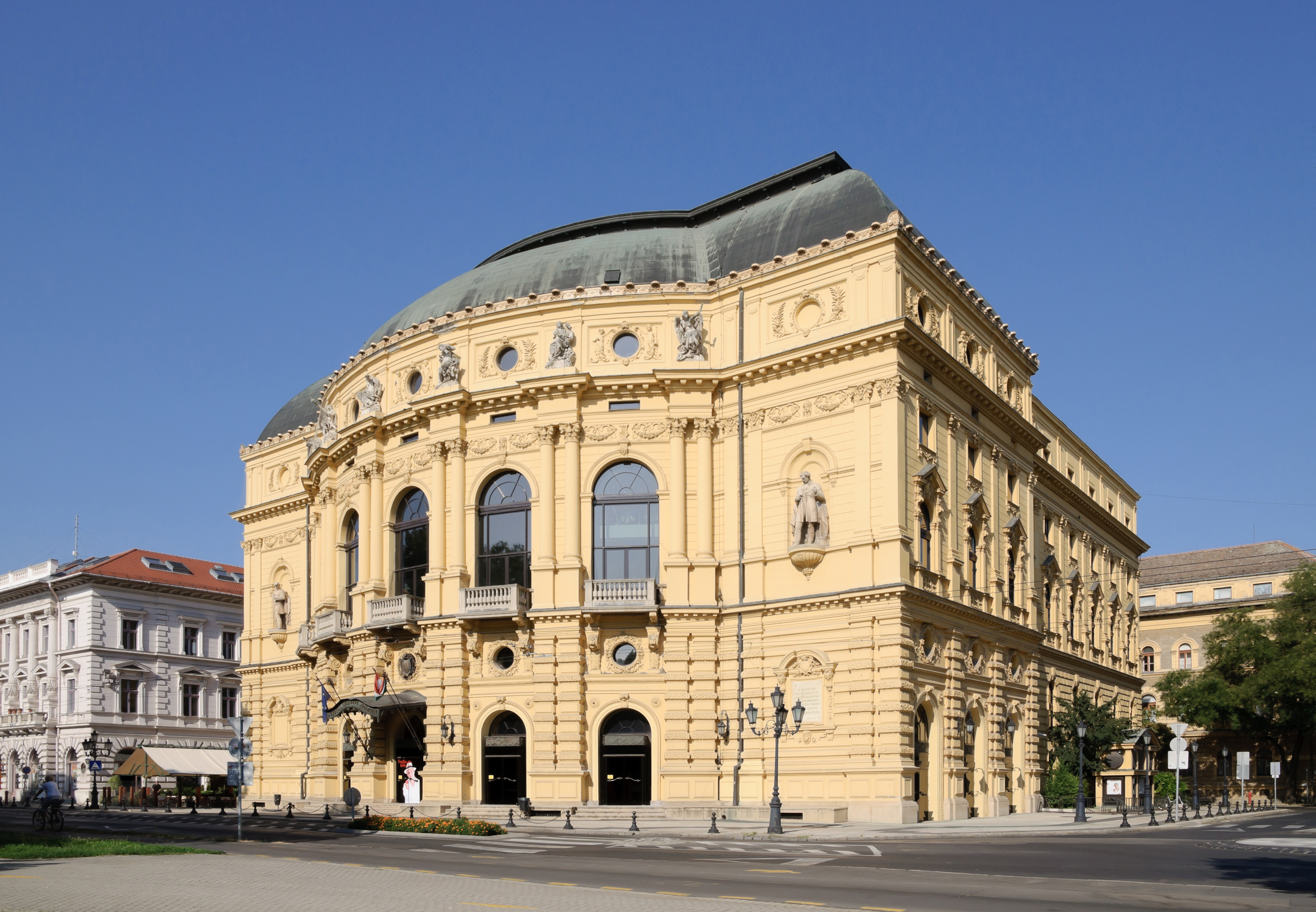
National Theatre (Szeged)

== See also ==
- List of cities and towns of Hungary
