= Attila Gajda =

Hungarian politician

Member of the National Assembly
- Assuming office 9 May 2026
- Succeeding: Béla Mihálffy
- Constituency: Csongrád-Csanád 2nd

Personal details
- Party: Tisza

Attila Gajda is a Hungarian politician who was elected member of the National Assembly in 2026 representing the Csongrád-Csanád County 2nd constituency. He previously worked as a physical education teacher and trainer.
