= Algyő =

Coordinates: 46°20′N 20°12′E

- Large village
- Coat of arms
- Interactive map of Algyő
- Country: Hungary
- County: Csongrád
- District: Szeged

Area
  - Total: 75.77 km^{2} (29.25 sq mi)

Population (2015)
  - Total: 5,088
  - Density: 67.15/km^{2} (173.9/sq mi)
- Time zone: UTC+1 (CET)
  - Summer (DST): UTC+2 (CEST)
- Postal code: 6750
- Area code: (+36) 62

Algyő [ˈɒlɟøː] (Croatian: Đeva) is a large village in Csongrád County, in the Southern Great Plain region of southern Hungary.

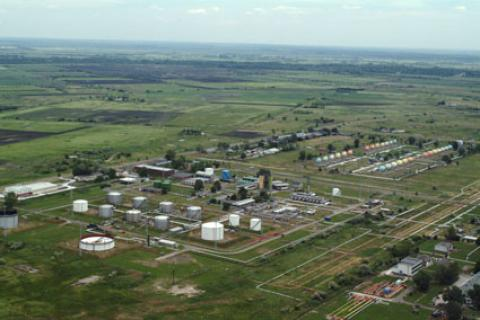
Aerial photography of Algyő oil field

== Geography ==
It covers an area of 75.77 km^{2} (29 sq mi) and has a population of 5088 people (2015).
