= Hódmezővásárhely District =

Coordinates: 46.4167°N 20.3333°E

Hódmezővásárhely District Hódmezővásárhelyi járás
- Districts of Hungary
- Coat of arms

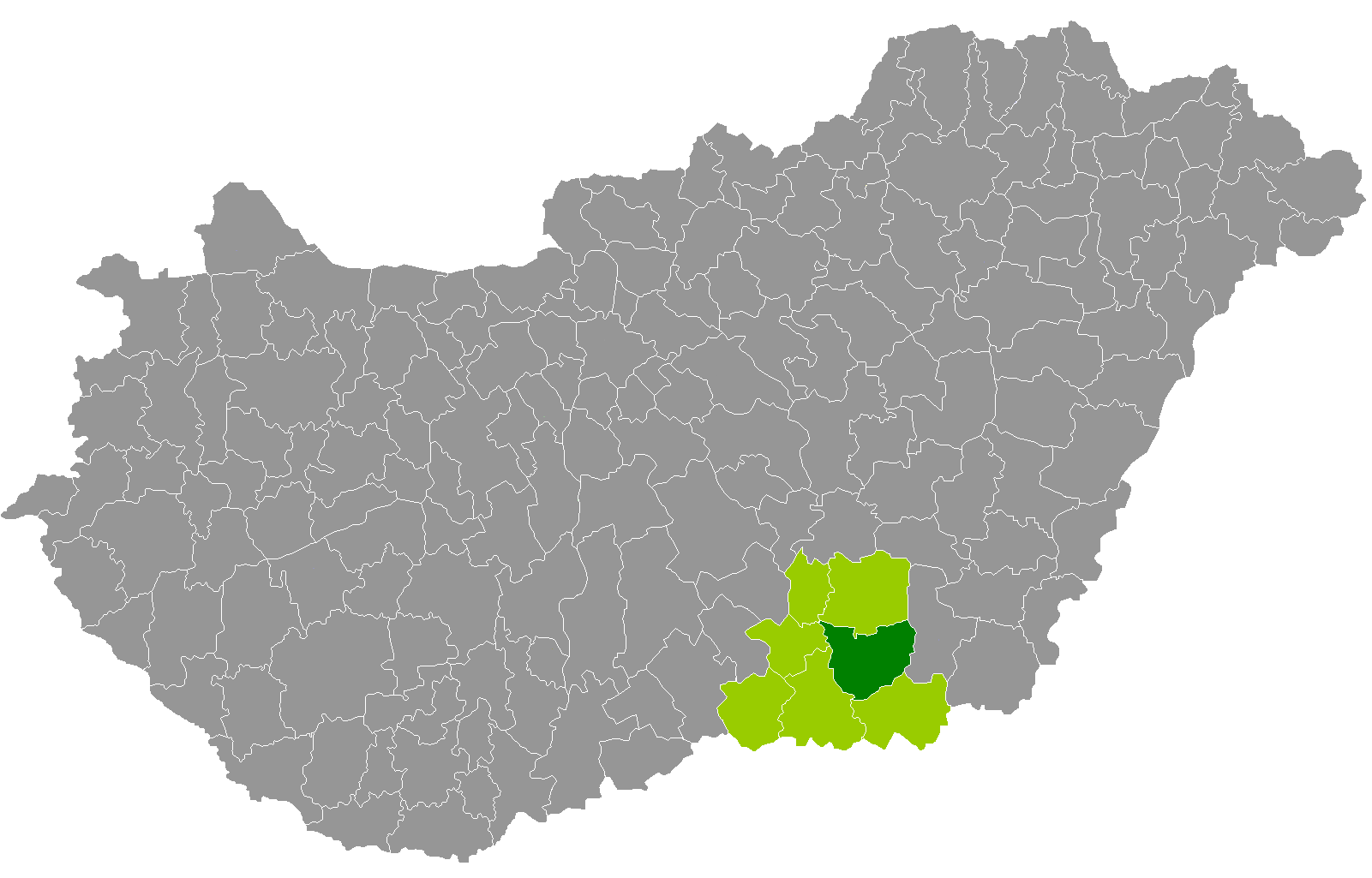
- Hódmezővásárhely District within Hungary and Csongrád County.
- Country: Hungary
- County: Csongrád
- District seat: Hódmezővásárhely

Area
  - Total: 707.77 km^{2} (273.27 sq mi)
  - Rank: 3rd in Csongrád

Population (2011 census)
  - Total: 56,560
  - Rank: 2nd in Csongrád
  - Density: 80/km^{2} (210/sq mi)

Hódmezővásárhely (Hungarian: Hódmezővásárhelyi járás) is a district in eastern part of Csongrád County. Hódmezővásárhely is also the name of the town where the district seat is found. The district is located in the Southern Great Plain Statistical Region.

== Geography ==
Hódmezővásárhely District borders with Szentes District to the north, Orosháza District (Békés County) to the east, Makó District to the south, Szeged District and Kistelek District to the west. The number of the inhabited places in Hódmezővásárhely District is 4.

== Municipalities ==
The district has 1 urban county, 1 town and 2 villages. (ordered by population, as of 1 January 2012)

- **Hódmezővásárhely** (46,522) – district seat
- Mártély (1,359)
- **Mindszent** (6,685)
- Székkutas (2,336)

The bolded municipalities are cities.

== Demographics ==
Religion in Hódmezővásárhely District (2011 census)
1. Catholic Church (24.2%)
2. Greek Catholicism (0.20%)
3. Calvinism (14.2%)
4. Lutheranism (0.60%)
5. Other religions (2.30%)
6. Non-religious (29.4%)
7. Atheists (1.40%)
8. Undeclared (27.7%)

In 2011, it had a population of 56,560 and the population density was 80/km^{2}.

Year	County population	Change
2011	56,560	n/a

=== Ethnicity ===
Besides the Hungarian majority, the main minorities are the Roma (approx. 600) and German (250).

Total population (2011 census): 56,560
Ethnic groups (2011 census): Identified themselves: 50,015 persons:

- Hungarians: 48,444 (96.86%)
- Gypsies: 571 (1.41%)
- Others and indefinable: 1,000 (2.00%)

Approx. 6,500 persons in Hódmezővásárhely District did not declare their ethnic group at the 2011 census.

=== Religion ===
Religious adherence in the county according to 2011 census:

- Catholic – 13,789 (Roman Catholic – 13,699; Greek Catholic – 88);
- Reformed – 8,059;
- Evangelical – 369;
- other religions – 1,277;
- Non-religious – 16,606;
- Atheism – 771;
- Undeclared – 15,689.

== Gallery ==
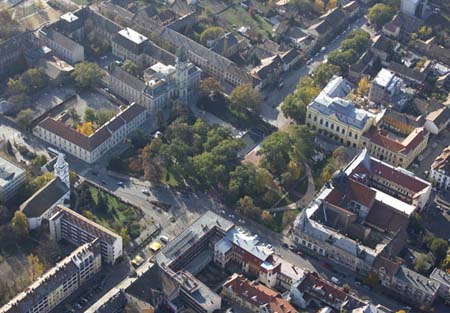
Hódmezővásárhely, the Peasant Paris

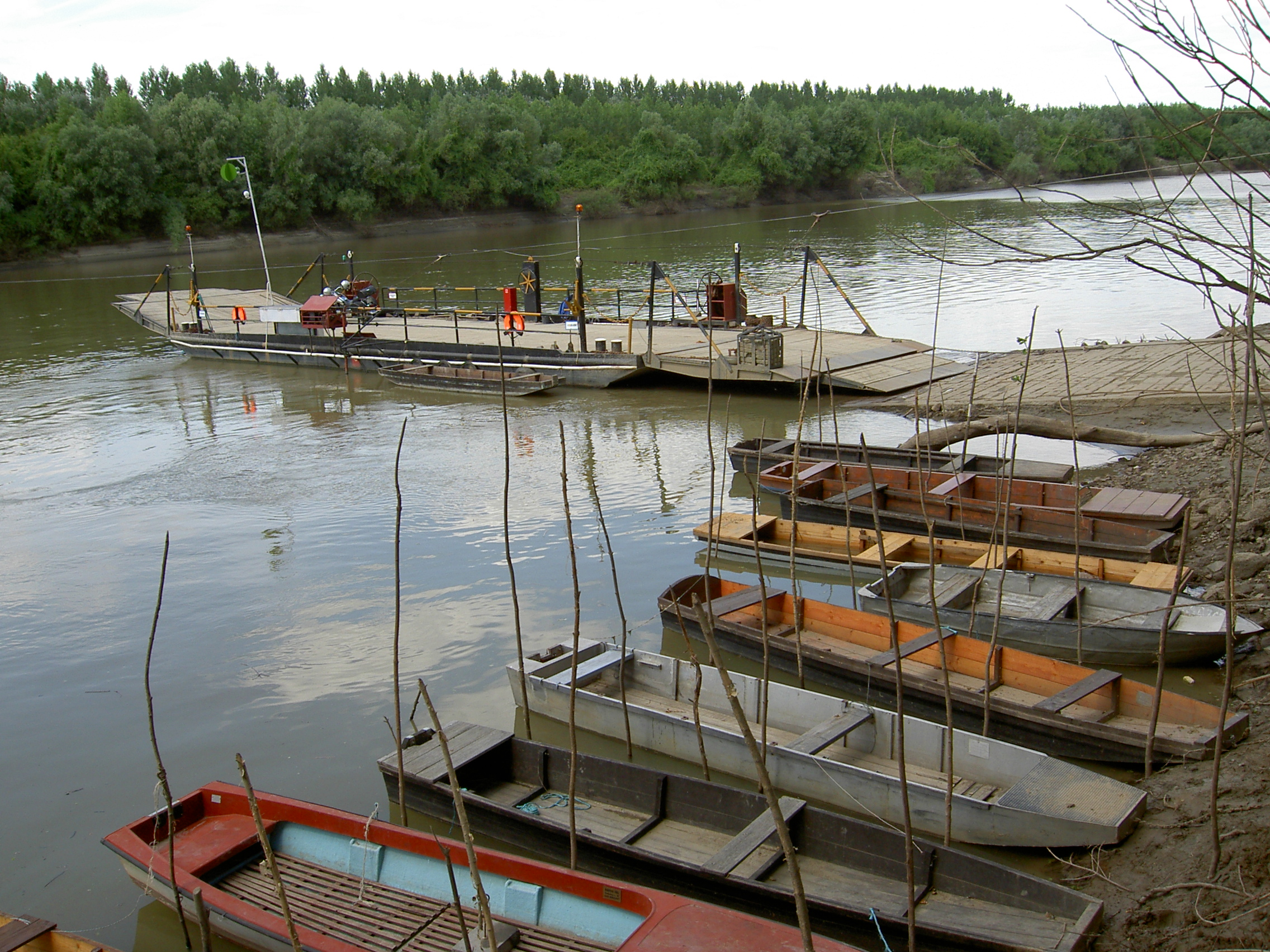
The ferry at Mindszent (Tisza river)

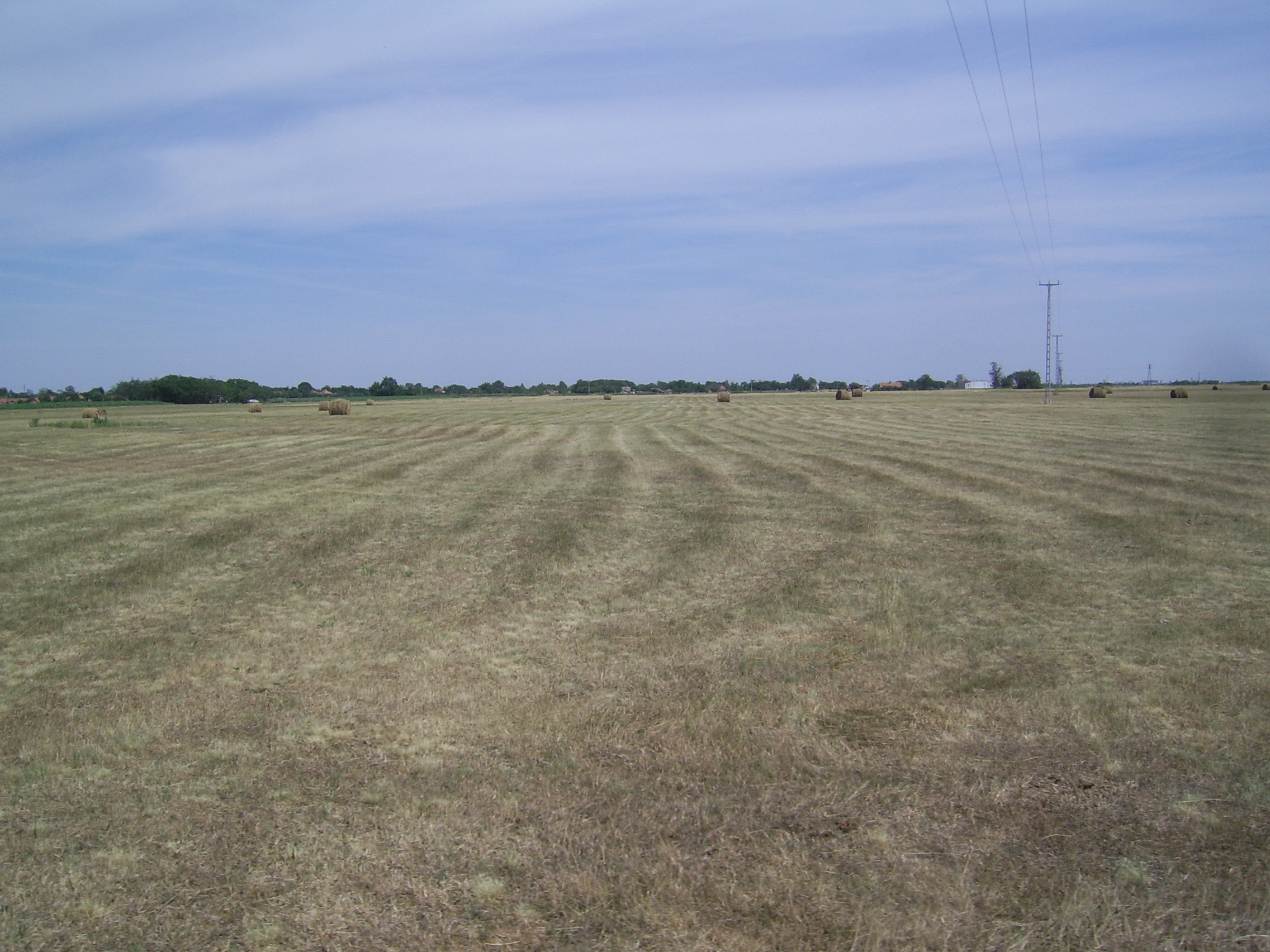
Plain near Mártély

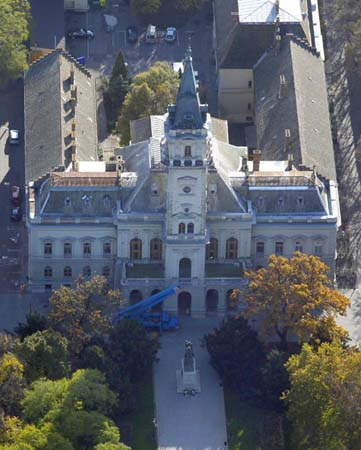
Town Hall in Hódmezővásárhely

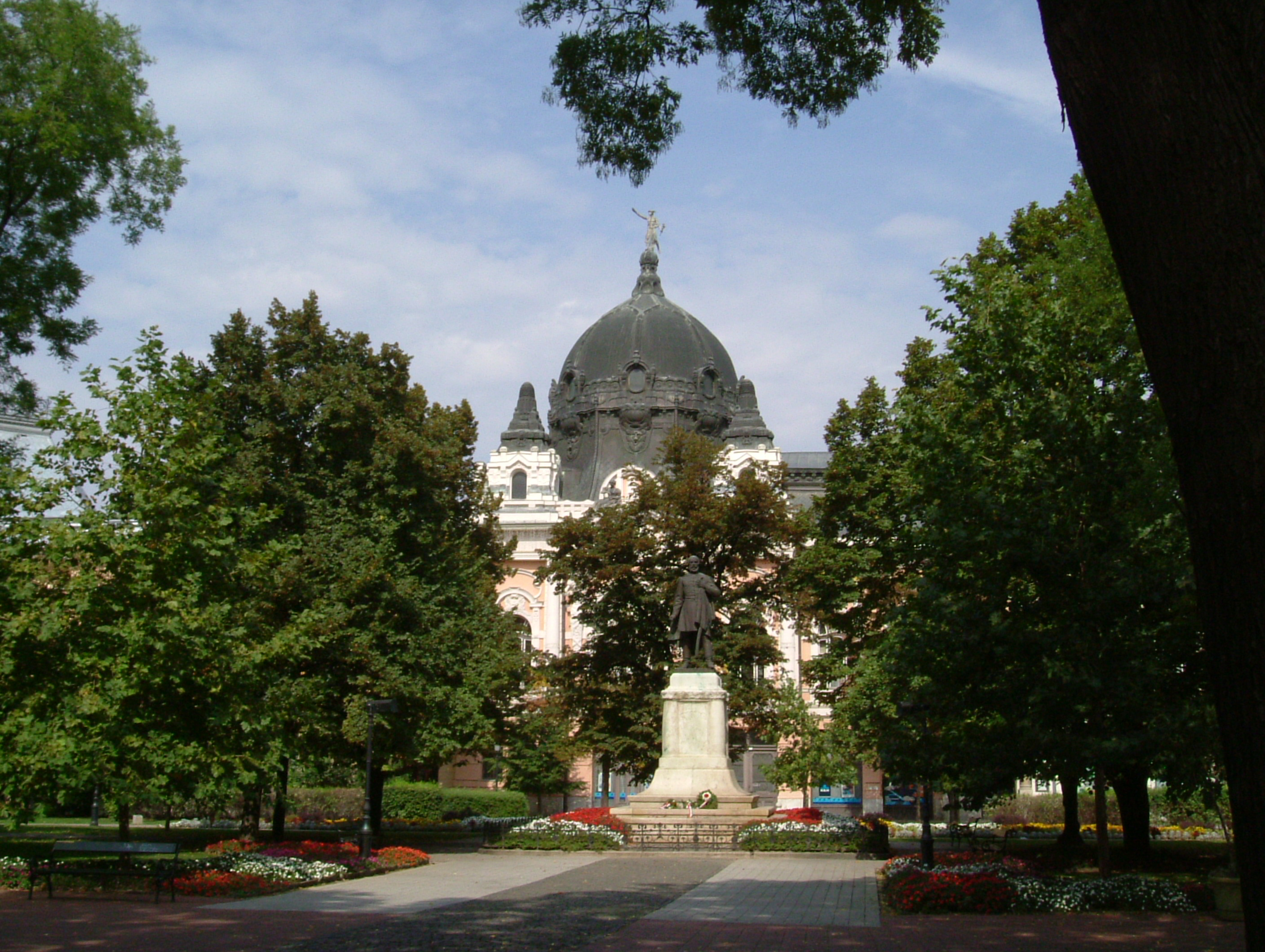
Park in Hódmezővásárhely

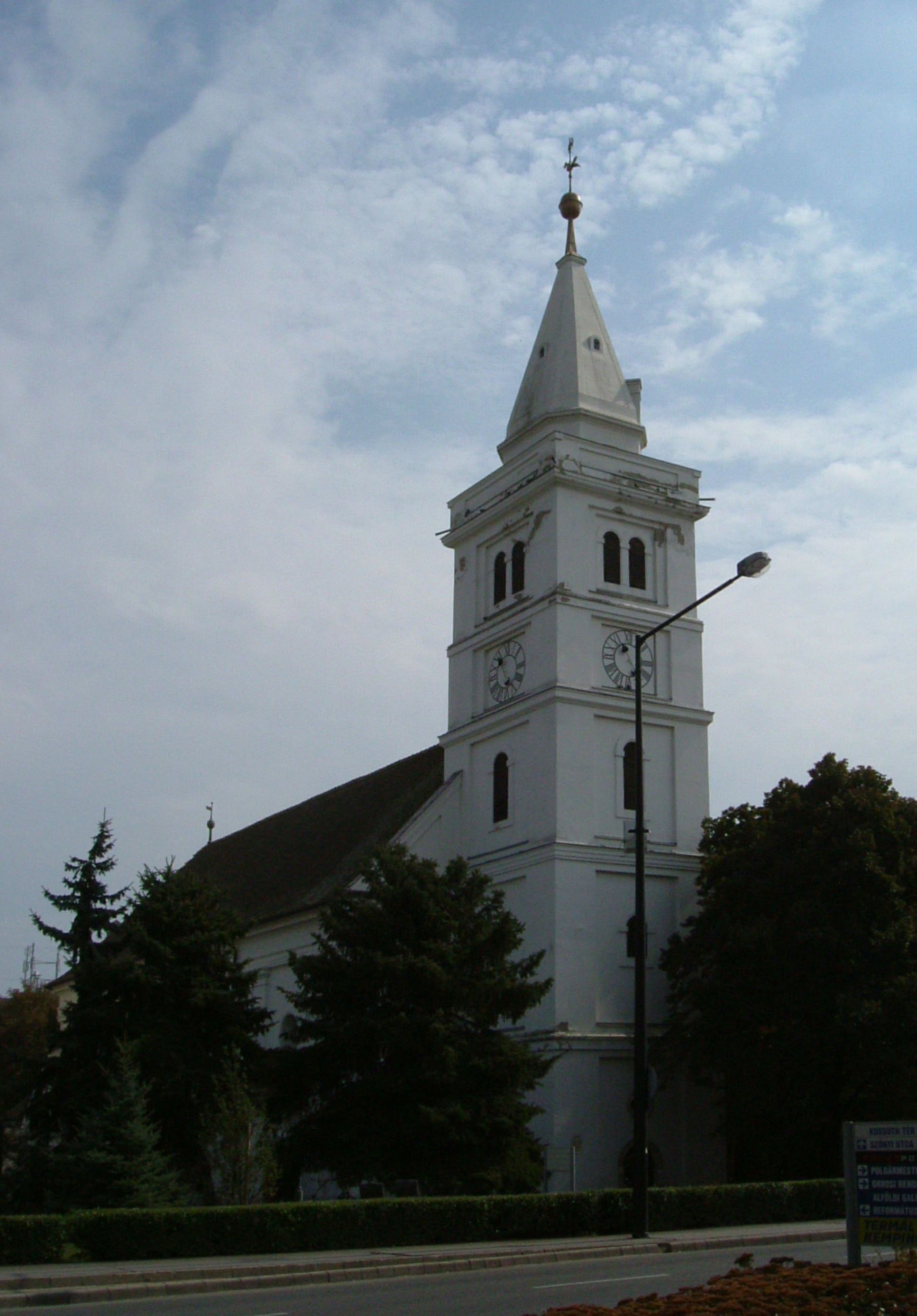
Reformed Church in Hódmezővásárhely

== See also ==
- List of cities and towns of Hungary
