= Algyő oil field =

Oil field in Hungary

Coordinates: 46.316495456852564°N 20.18695855940302°E

Algyő
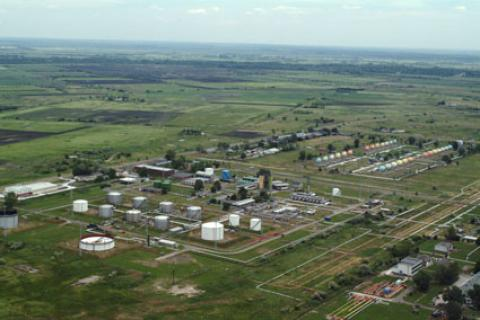
- Oil reservoirs in Algyő
- Country: Hungary
- Region: Csongrád County
- Offshore/onshore: onshore
- Operator: MOL Group

Field history
- Discovery: 1965
- Start of development: 1965
- Start of production: 1965

Production
- Current production of oil: 8,500 barrels per day (~4.2×10^{5} t/a)
- Estimated oil in place: 84 million tonnes (~ 100×10^{6} m^{3} or 629 million bbl)
- Estimated gas in place: 114×10^{9} m^{3} 4×10^{12} cu ft

The Algyő oil field is an oil field located in Algyő, Csongrád County, in Hungary. It was discovered in 1965 and developed by MOL Group. It began production in 1965 and produces oil. The total proven reserves of the Algyő oil field are approximately 629 million barrels (84 million tonnes). It provides nearly half of Hungary's crude oil.
