= Mindszent =

- Town
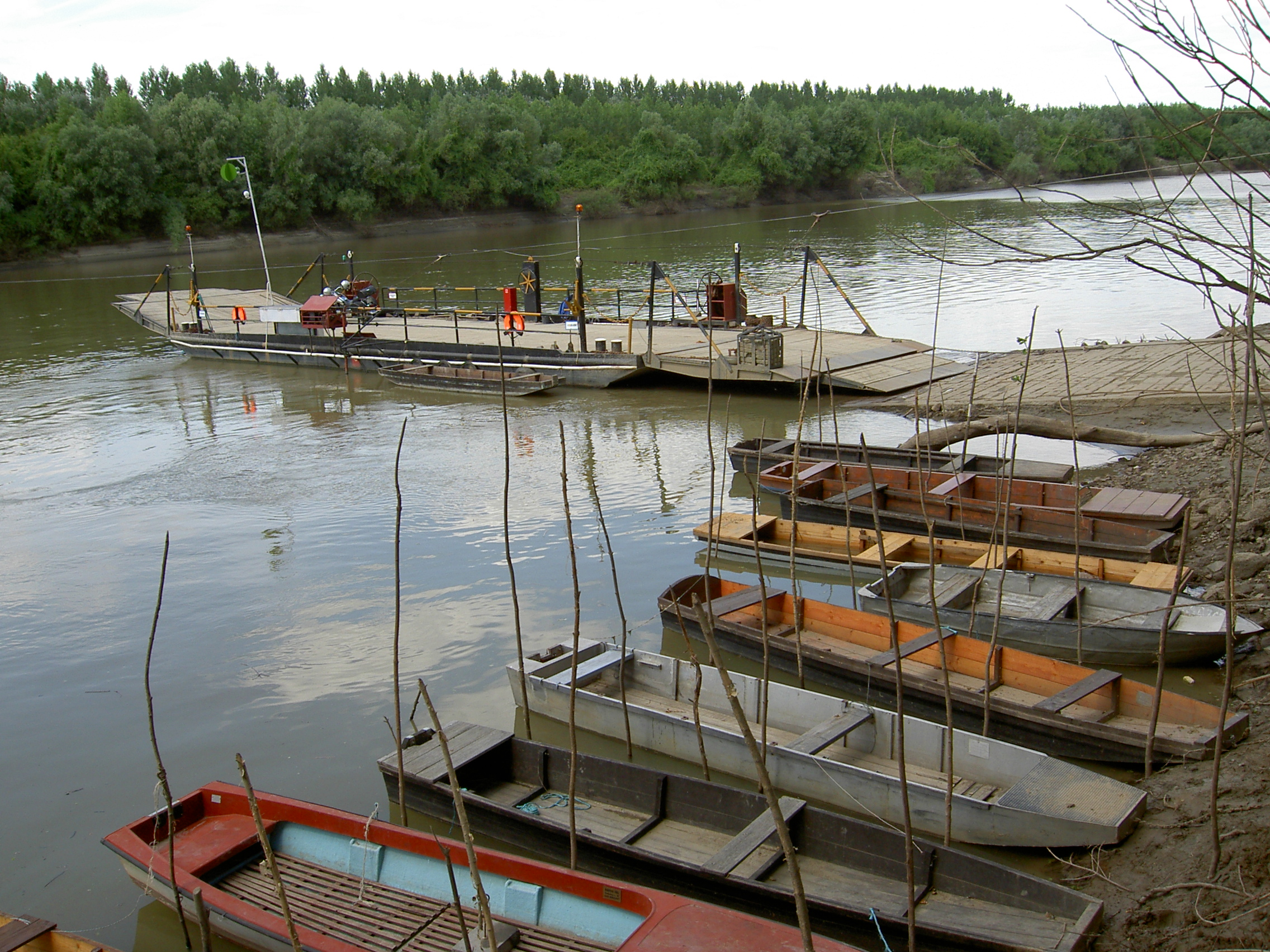
- Ferry at Mindszent

- Flag Coat of arms

- Mindszent
- Coordinates: 46.525°N 20.185°E
- Country: Hungary
- County: Csongrád-Csanád
- District: Hódmezővásárhely

Area
  - Total: 59.39 km^{2} (22.93 sq mi)

Population (2008)
  - Total: 7,031
  - Density: 124/km^{2} (320/sq mi)
- Time zone: UTC+1 (CET)
  - Summer (DST): UTC+2 (CEST)
- Postal code: 6630
- Area code: (+36) 62
- Website: mindszent.hu

Mindszent is a town in Csongrád-Csanád County, in the Southern Great Plain region of southern Hungary.

== Geography ==
It covers an area of 59.39 km^{2} (23 sq mi) and has a population of 7,031 people (2008).
