= Csanytelek =

Coordinates: 46°36′22″N 20°06′17″E

- Village
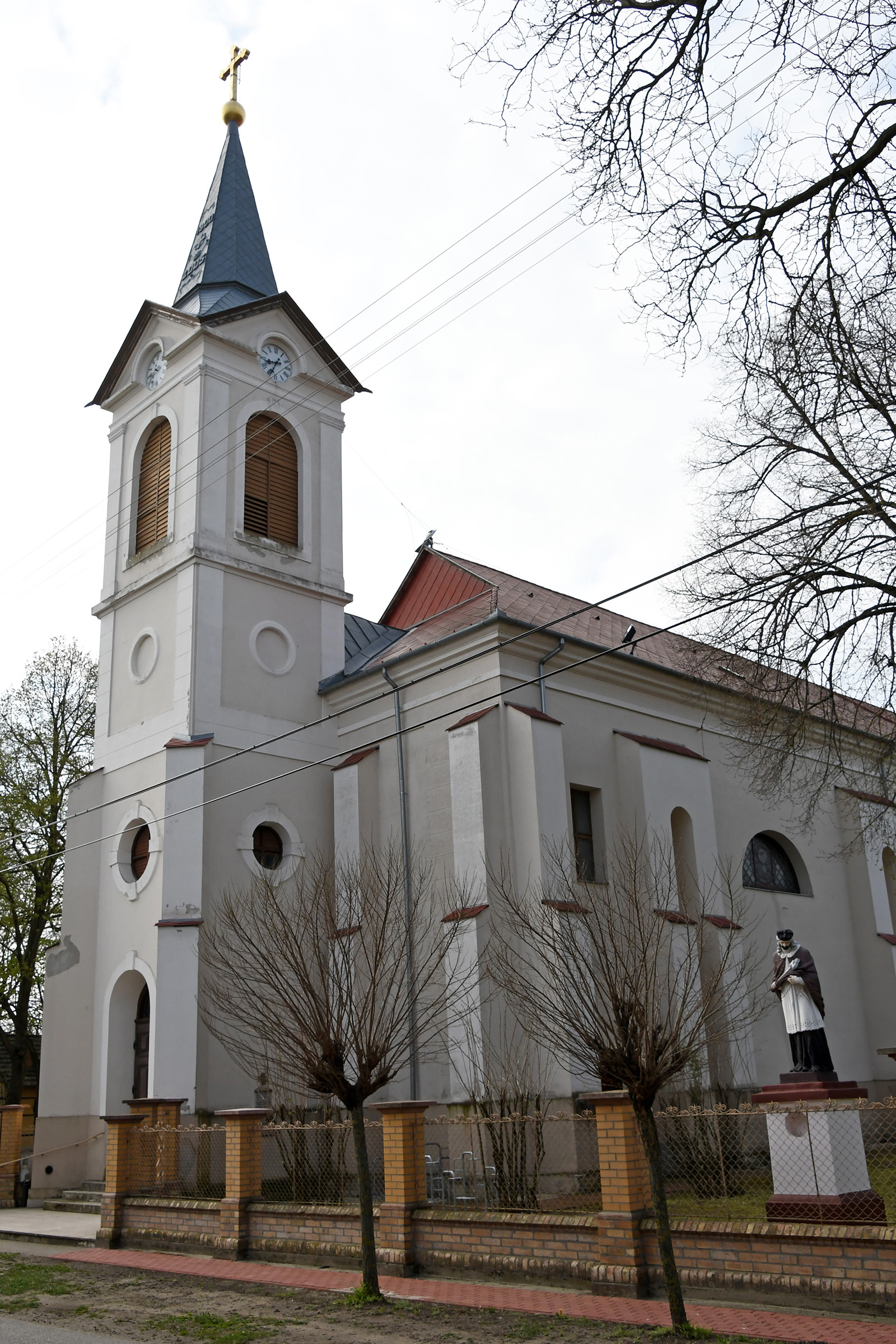
- Roman Catholic church in Csanytelek

- Coat of arms
- Interactive map of Csanytelek
- Country: Hungary
- County: Csongrád

Area
  - Total: 34.71 km^{2} (13.40 sq mi)

Population (2025)
  - Total: 2,556
  - Density: 73.52/km^{2} (190.4/sq mi)
- Time zone: UTC+1 (CET)
  - Summer (DST): UTC+2 (CEST)
- Postal code: 6647
- Area code: 63

Csanytelek is a village in Csongrád-Csanád County, in the Southern Great Plain region of southern Hungary.

== Geography ==
It covers an area of 34.71 km^{2} (13 sq mi) and has a population of 2628 people (2015).
