= László B. Nagy =

Hungarian politician

Member of the National Assembly
- In office 14 May 2010 – 1 May 2022

Personal details
- Born: 9 February 1958 (age 68) Szeged, Hungary
- Party: Fidesz
- Profession: politician

László B. Nagy (born February 9, 1958) is a Hungarian politician, member of the National Assembly (MP) from 2010 to 2022.

== Career ==
He was born on 9 February 1958 in Szeged. He graduated from the Miklós Radnóti High School in Szeged in 1976. Between 1978 and 1983, he studied and graduated from the University of Agricultural Sciences in Debrecen (present-day a faculty of the University of Debrecen) with a degree in general agricultural engineering. Between 1983 and 1992 he was a researcher at the Grain Research Institute in Szeged. In 1995, he completed a Diploma of Management Studies at Brunel University London. In 2001, he completed his Master of Business Administration at Brunel University London.

B. Nagy became MP from Csongrád County Regional List of the right-wing Fidesz. He served as a member of the Economic and Information Technology Committee from May 14, 2010 to February 14, 2011. He unsuccessfully ran for the position of mayor of Szeged in the 2010 local elections, but defeated by incumbent mayor László Botka. B. Nagy was appointed director of Government Office of Csongrád County on January 1, 2011. He held the office until May 2014, when he was elected MP for Szeged (Csongrád County Constituency II). He was re-elected as MP in the 2018 parliamentary election. He was a member of the Legislative Committee from May 2014 to May 2022.

B. Nagy was replaced as candidate of Fidesz in Szeged 2nd constituency by Béla Mihálffy in the 2022 Hungarian parliamentary election.
