= Öttömös =

- Village
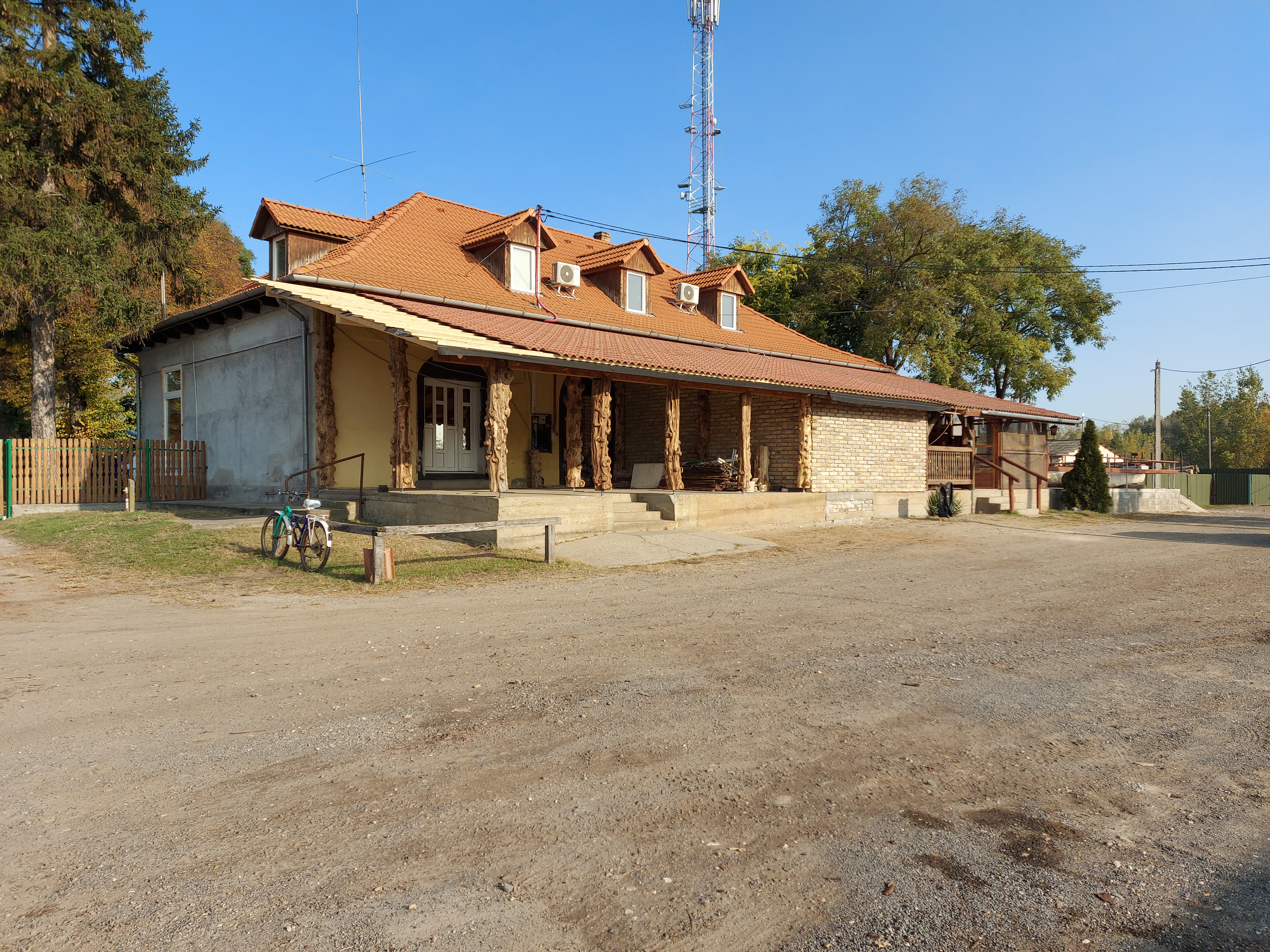
- Petróczi csárda (Hungarian style Inn)

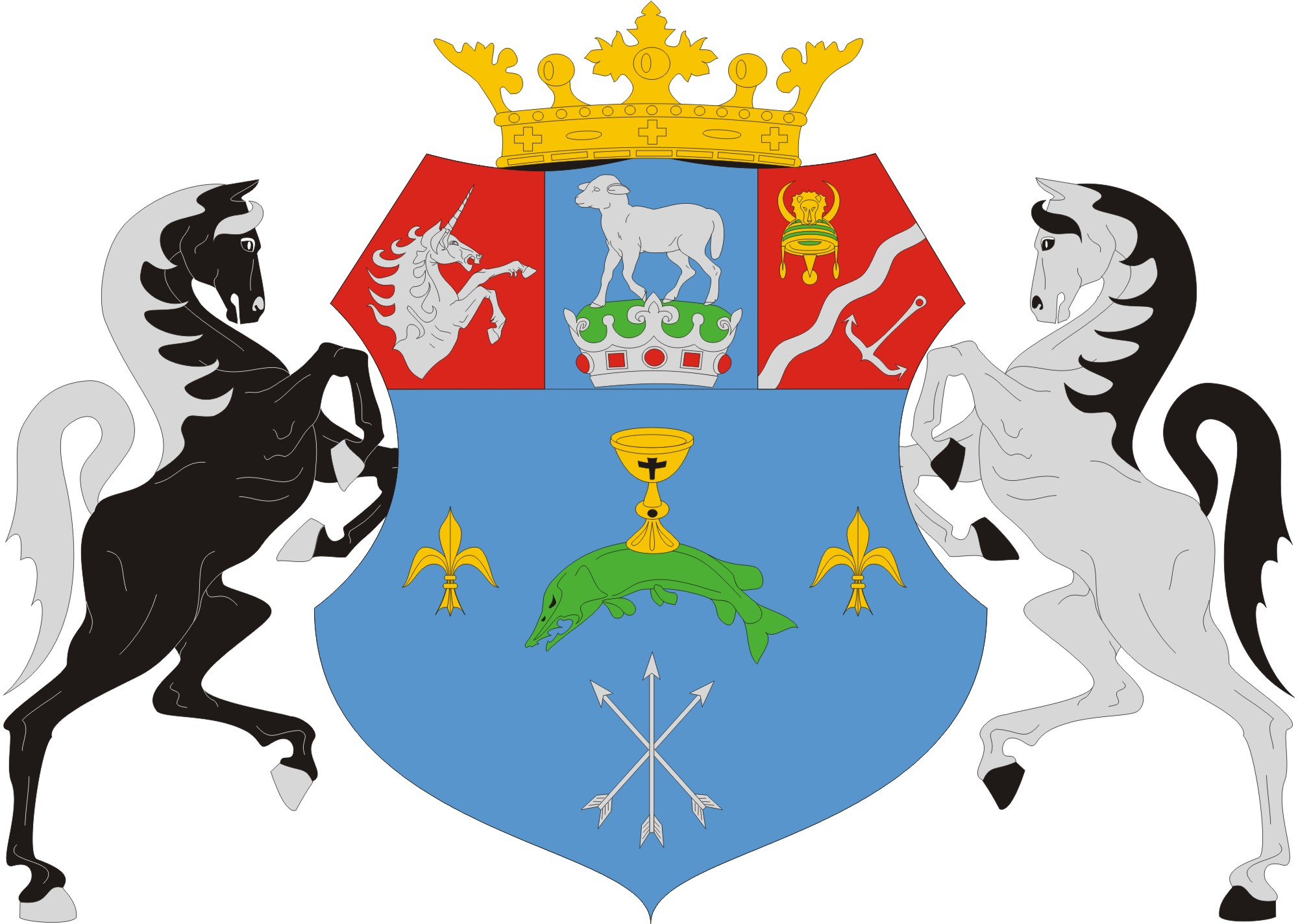
- Coat of arms

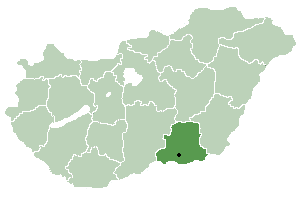

- Location of Öttömös.
- Coordinates: 46°17′N 19°41′E
- Country: Hungary
- County: Csongrád-Csanád County
- District: Mórahalom District

Government
  - Mayor: Dobó István (Ind.)

Area
  - Total: 30.91 km^{2} (11.93 sq mi)

Population (2022)
  - Total: 616
  - Density: 19.9/km^{2} (51.6/sq mi)
- Time zone: UTC+1 (CET)
  - Summer (DST): UTC+2 (CEST)
- Postal code: 6784
- Area code: 62

Öttömös is a village in the Mórahalom District, in Csongrád-Csanád County, in the Southern Great Plain region of southern Hungary.

== Geography ==
It covers an area of 30.91 km^{2} (12 sq mi) and has a population of 616 people (2022).
