= Mórahalom =

- Town
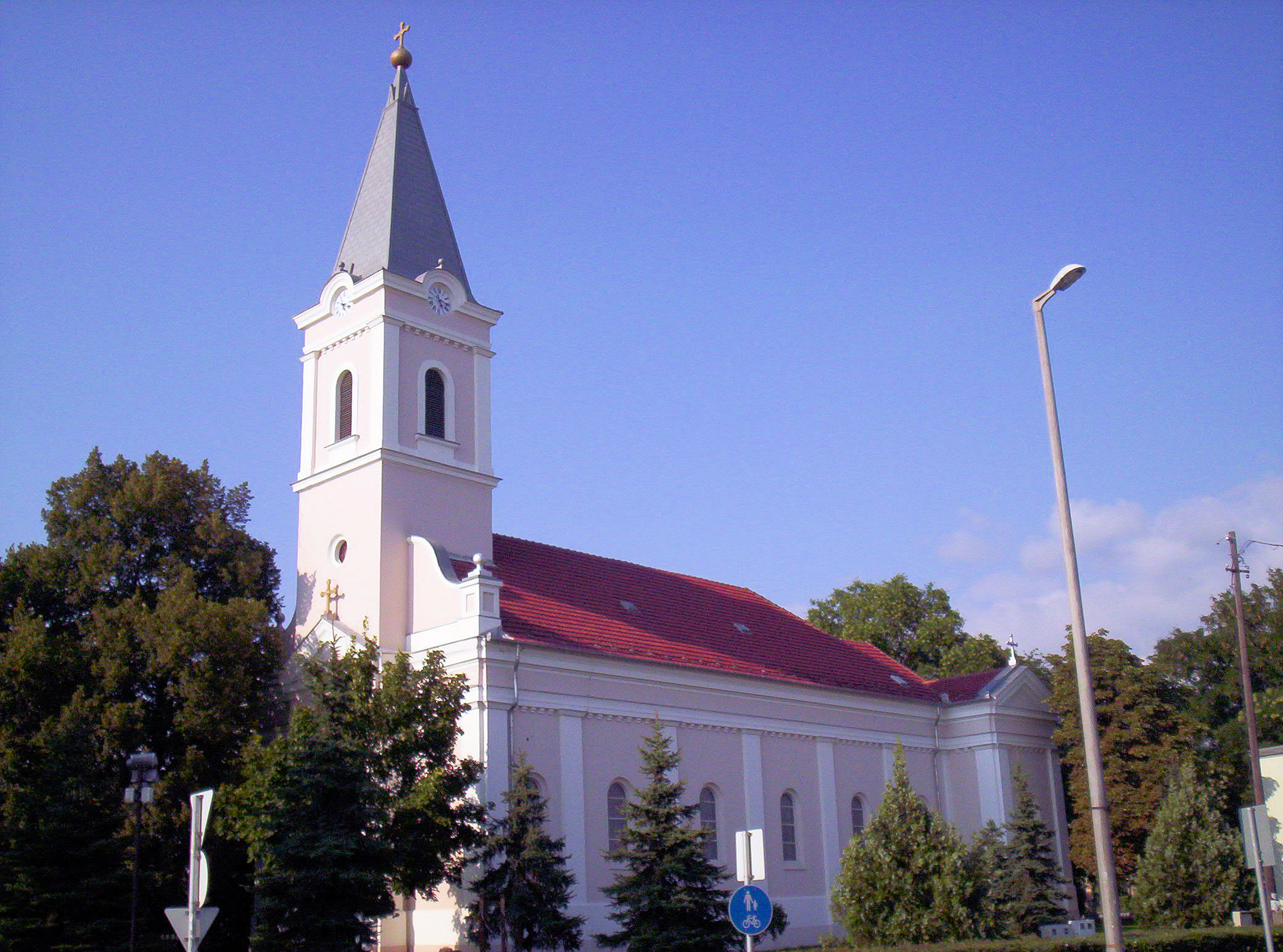
- Church of Saint Luke

- Coat of arms

- Location within Csongrád County Location within Hungary
- Coordinates: 46.21636°N 19.88946°E
- Country: Hungary
- County: Csongrád-Csanád
- District: Mórahalom

Government
  - Mayor: Zoltán Nógrádi (Fidesz-KDNP)

Area
  - Total: 83.15 km^{2} (32.10 sq mi)

Population (2011)
  - Total: 6,090
  - Density: 73.2/km^{2} (190/sq mi)
- Time zone: UTC+1 (CET)
  - Summer (DST): UTC+2 (CEST)
- Postal code: 6782
- Area code: (+36) 62
- Website: www.morahalom.hu

Mórahalom is a town in Csongrád-Csanád county, in the Southern Great Plain region of southern Hungary. It is close to the Serbian border.

== Etymology ==
The name of the town originates from the sand dune of “Móra Halma”, which was first mentioned in 1729.

== History ==
A 100.75 ha, agriculture-oriented industrial park was established near the town in 1997, housing 89 enterprises and employing 550 people as of 2015, and 106 businesses and 696 employed people as of 2019.

== Twin towns – sister cities ==
Mórahalom is twinned with:

- Chamerau, Germany
- Evje og Hornnes, Norway
- Fiumalbo, Italy
- Jimbolia, Romania
- Pievepelago, Italy
- Sânmartin, Romania
- Temerin, Serbia
- Uniejów, Poland

== Sport ==
Speedway Maraton Salakmotor (B.S.K.) run motorcycle speedway events at the speedway track, 7 kilometres south of the city. The venue is located at (46°10′14″N 19°54′49″E), adjacent to the motocross track which was run by the speedway rider Róbert Nagy for several years and hosted an international meeting between Hungary and Poland in 2013.
