= Ruzsa =

Coordinates: 46°17′N 19°45′E

- Village
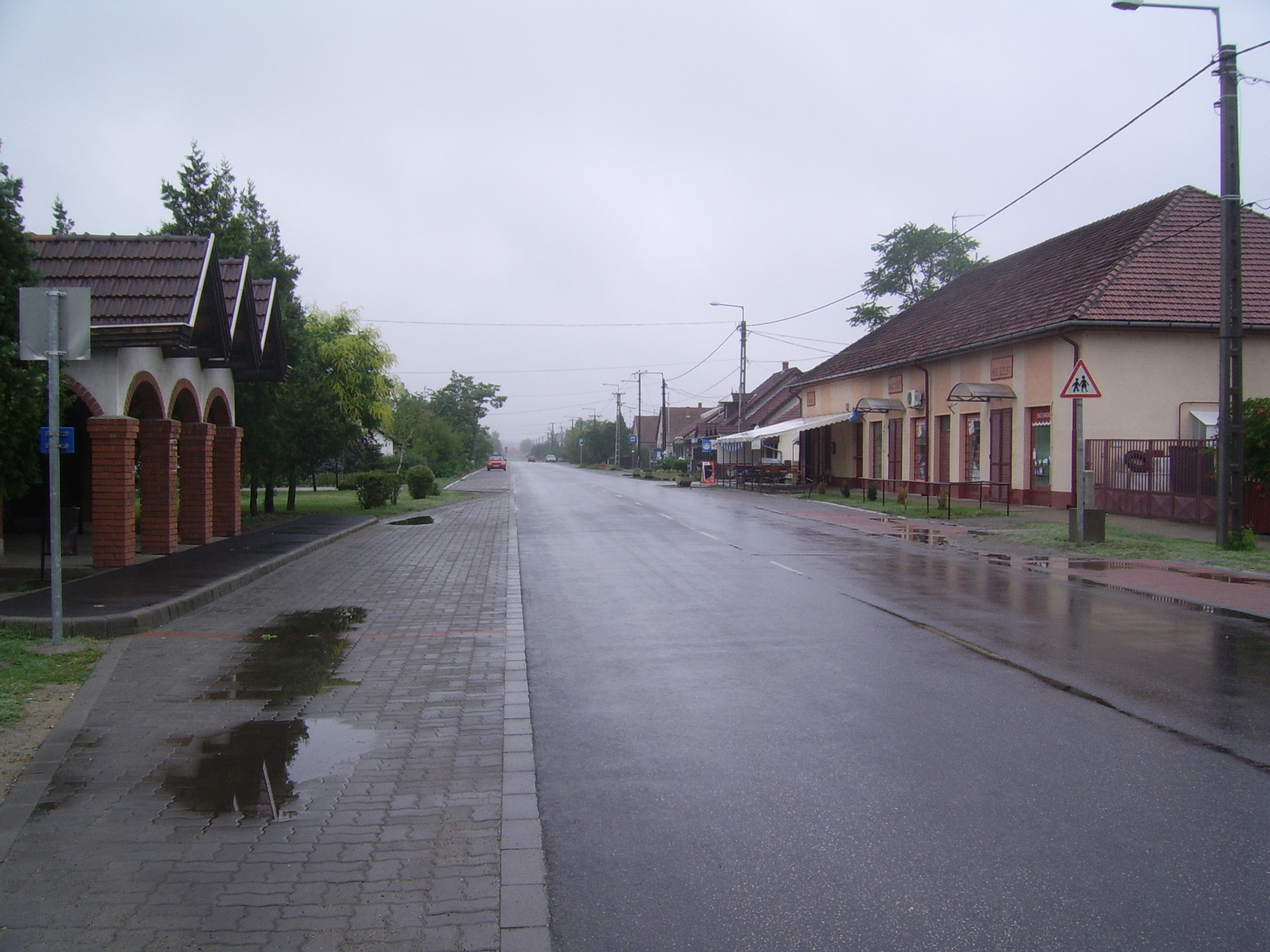
- Saint Stephen street in Ruzsa

- Coat of arms
- Interactive map of Ruzsa
- Country: Hungary
- County: Csongrád

Government
  - Mayor: Sánta Gizella (Ind.)

Area
  - Total: 84.68 km^{2} (32.70 sq mi)

Population (2022)
  - Total: 2,306
  - Density: 27.23/km^{2} (70.53/sq mi)
- Time zone: UTC+1 (CET)
  - Summer (DST): UTC+2 (CEST)
- Postal code: 6786
- Area code: 62

Ruzsa is a village in Csongrád county, in the Southern Great Plain region of southern Hungary.

== Geography ==
It covers an area of 84.68 km^{2} (33 sq mi) and has a population of 2306 people (2022).

== History ==
The village derives its name from the Rózsa family. The infamous Hungarian outlaw Rózsa Sándor was captured in the area.
