= Bács-Kiskun County 6th constituency =

Hungarian national legislative constituency

Bács-Kiskun County 6th constituency (Baja)
- Constituency for the National Assembly
- Location of Bács-Kiskun county 06 within Bács-Kiskun county

- Location of Bács-Kiskun county within Hungary
- County: Bács-Kiskun
- Electorate: 66,063 (2018)
- Major settlements: Baja

Current constituency
- Created: 2011
- Party: TISZA
- Member: Bence Csontos
- Elected: 2026
- Coordinates: 46°11′00″N 18°57′13″E

The 6th constituency of Bács-Kiskun County (Hungarian: Bács-Kiskun megyei 06. számú országgyűlési egyéni választókerület) is one of the single member constituencies of the National Assembly, the national legislature of Hungary. The constituency standard abbreviation: Bács-Kiskun 06. OEVK.

Since 2026, it has been represented by Bence Csontos of the Tisza Party.

== Geography ==
The 3rd constituency is located in south-western part of Bács-Kiskun County.

=== List of municipalities ===
The constituency includes the following municipalities:

1. Bácsbokod
2. Bácsborsód
3. Bácsszentgyörgy
4. Baja
5. Bátmonostor
6. Csátalja
7. Csávoly
8. Dávod
9. Dunafalva
10. Dusnok
11. Érsekcsanád
12. Érsekhalma
13. Fajsz
14. Felsőszentiván
15. Gara
16. Hercegszántó
17. Katymár
18. Madaras
19. Mátételke
20. Nagybaracska
21. Nemesnádudvar
22. Rém
23. Sükösd
24. Szeremle
25. Vaskút

== Members ==
The constituency was first represented by Róbert Zsigó of the Fidesz from 2014, and he was re-elected in 2018 and 2022. In the 2026 election, Bence Csontos of the Tisza Party was elected representative.

Election	Member	Party	%	Ref.
2014	Róbert Zsigó	Fidesz	49.66	
2018	Róbert Zsigó	Fidesz	54.45	
2022	Róbert Zsigó	Fidesz	57.26	
2026	Bence Csontos	Tisza Party	53.15	
