= Baja District =

Baja District Bajai járás
- District
- Coat of arms

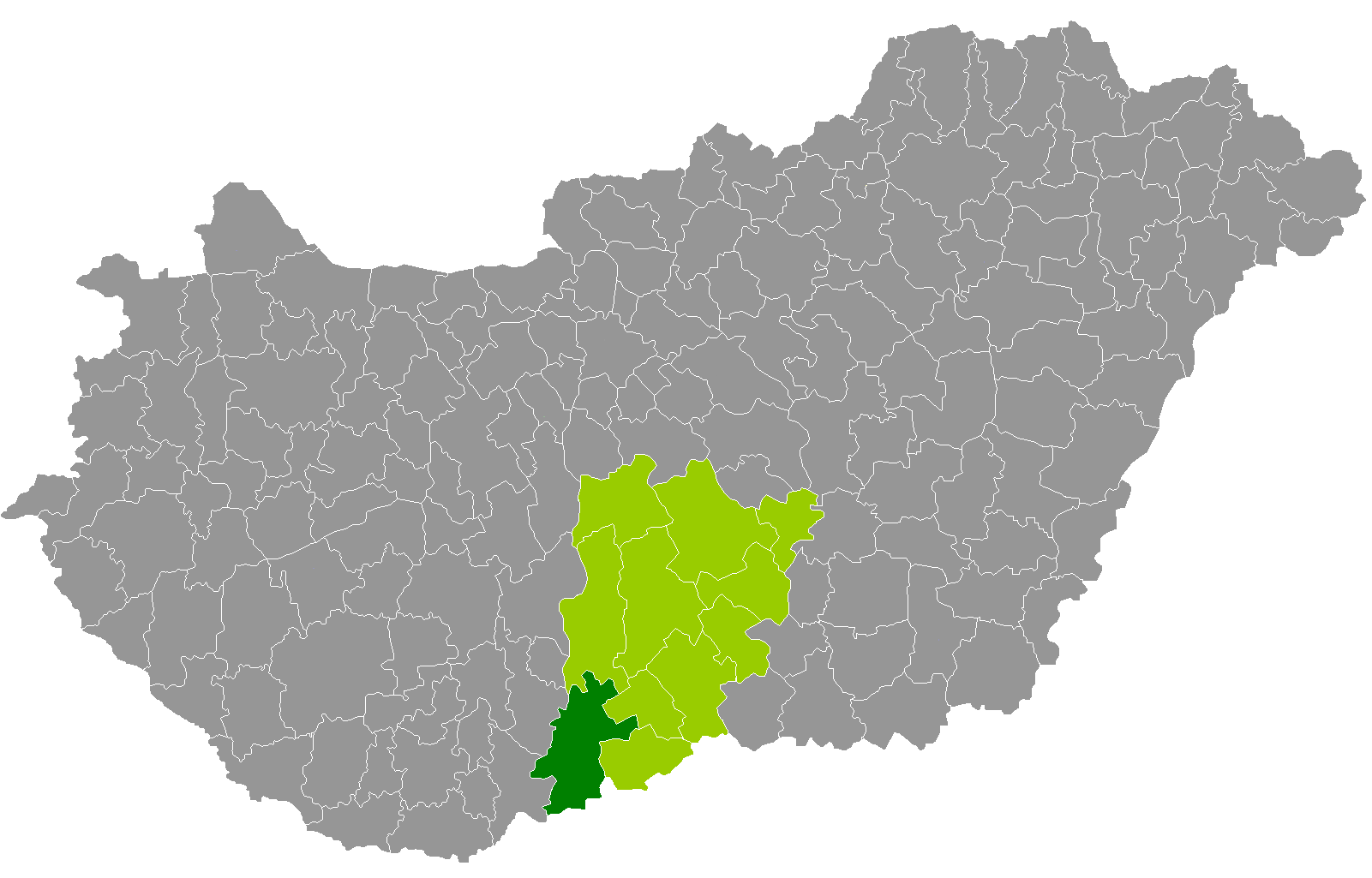
- Baja District within Hungary and Bács-Kiskun County.
- Country: Hungary
- County: Bács-Kiskun
- District seat: Baja

Area
  - Total: 1,008.80 km^{2} (389.50 sq mi)
  - Rank: 4th in Bács-Kiskun

Population (2011 census)
  - Total: 66,501
  - Rank: 2nd in Bács-Kiskun
  - Density: 66/km^{2} (170/sq mi)

Baja (Hungarian: Bajai járás; German: Kreis Baja) is a district in south-western part of Bács-Kiskun County. Baja is also the name of the town where the district seat is found. The district is located in the Southern Great Plain Statistical Region.

== Geography ==
Baja District borders with Kalocsa District to the north, Jánoshalma District and Bácsalmás District to the east, the Serbian district of West Bačka to the south, Mohács District (Baranya County) and Szekszárd District (Tolna County) to the west. The number of the inhabited places in Baja District is 17.

== Municipalities ==
The district has 1 town, 1 large village and 15 villages. (ordered by population, as of 1 January 2013)

- Bácsszentgyörgy (174)
- **Baja** (36,224) – district seat
- Bátmonostor (1,519)
- Csátalja (1,485)
- Csávoly (1,882)
- Dávod (2,003)
- Dunafalva (905)
- Érsekcsanád (2,830)
- Érsekhalma (599)
- Felsőszentiván (1,865)
- Gara (2,359)
- Hercegszántó (2,085)
- Nagybaracska (2,281)
- Nemesnádudvar (1,874)
- Sükösd (3,727)
- Szeremle (1,417)
- Vaskút (3,371)

The bolded municipality is city, italics municipality is large village.

== Demographics ==
Religion in Baja District (2011 census)
1. Catholic Church (55.3%)
2. Greek Catholicism (0.10%)
3. Calvinism (3.90%)
4. Lutheranism (0.50%)
5. Orthodoxy (0.20%)
6. Other religions (2.70%)
7. Non-religious (11.3%)
8. Atheists (0.90%)
9. Undeclared (25.1%)

In 2011, it had a population of 66,501 and the population density was 66/km^{2}.

Year	County population	Change
2011	66,501	n/a

=== Ethnicity ===
Besides the Hungarian majority, the main minorities are the German (approx. 3,700), Croat (1,600), Roma (1,100), Serb (350) and Romanian (100).

Total population (2011 census): 66,501
Ethnic groups (2011 census): Identified themselves: 63,845 persons:

- Hungarians: 56,380 (88.31%)
- Germans: 3,685 (5.77%)
- Croats: 1,632 (2.56%)
- Romani: 1,092 (1.71%)
- Others and indefinable: 1,056 (1.65%)

Approx. 3,000 persons in Baja District did not declare their ethnic group at the 2011 census.

=== Religion ===
Religious adherence in the county according to 2011 census:

- Catholic – 36,891 (Roman Catholic – 36,793; Greek Catholic – 90);
- Reformed – 2,598;
- Evangelical – 315;
- Orthodox – 95;
- other religions – 1,789;
- Non-religious – 7,534;
- Atheism – 573;
- Undeclared – 16,706.

== Gallery ==
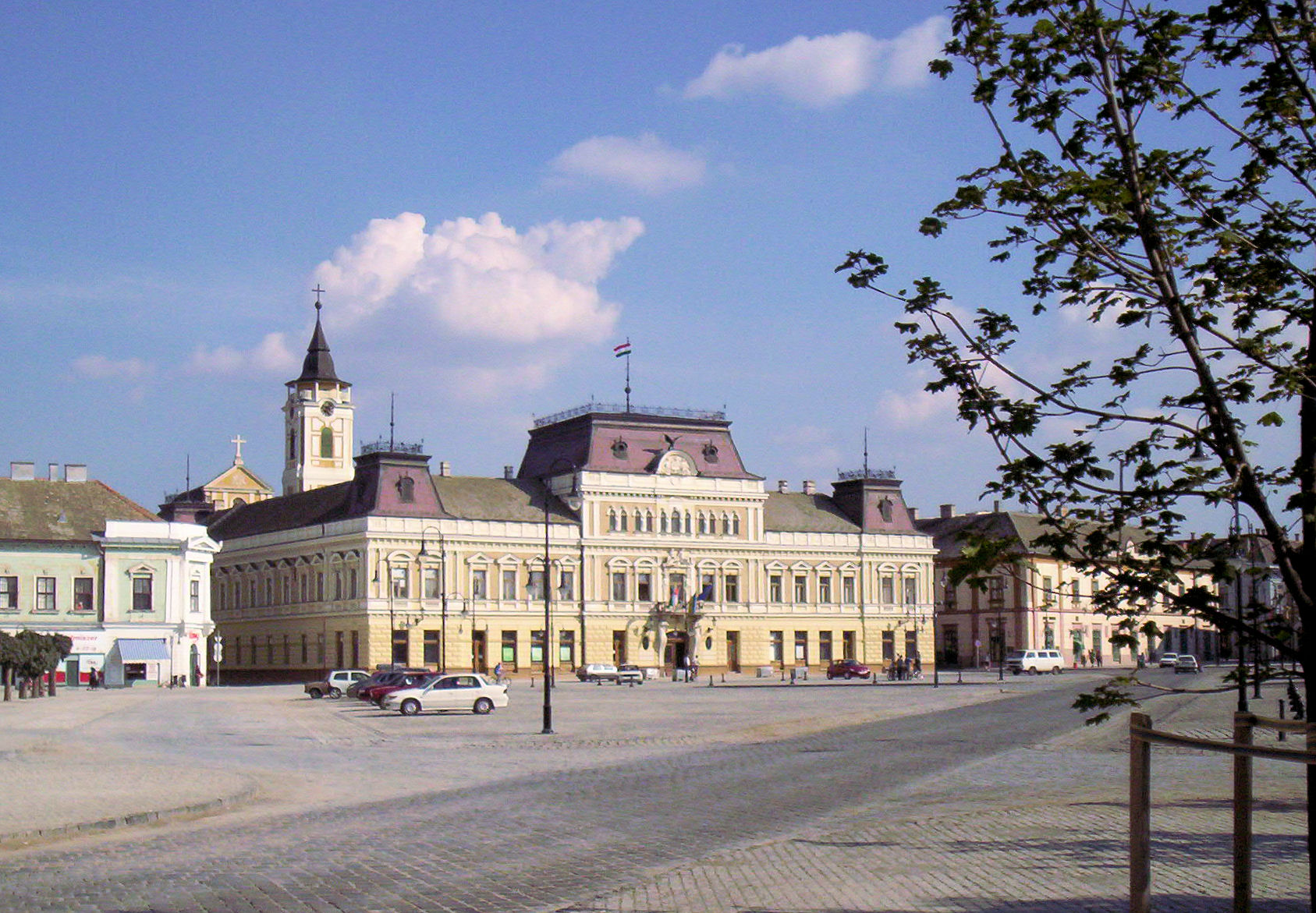
Baja, Town Hall

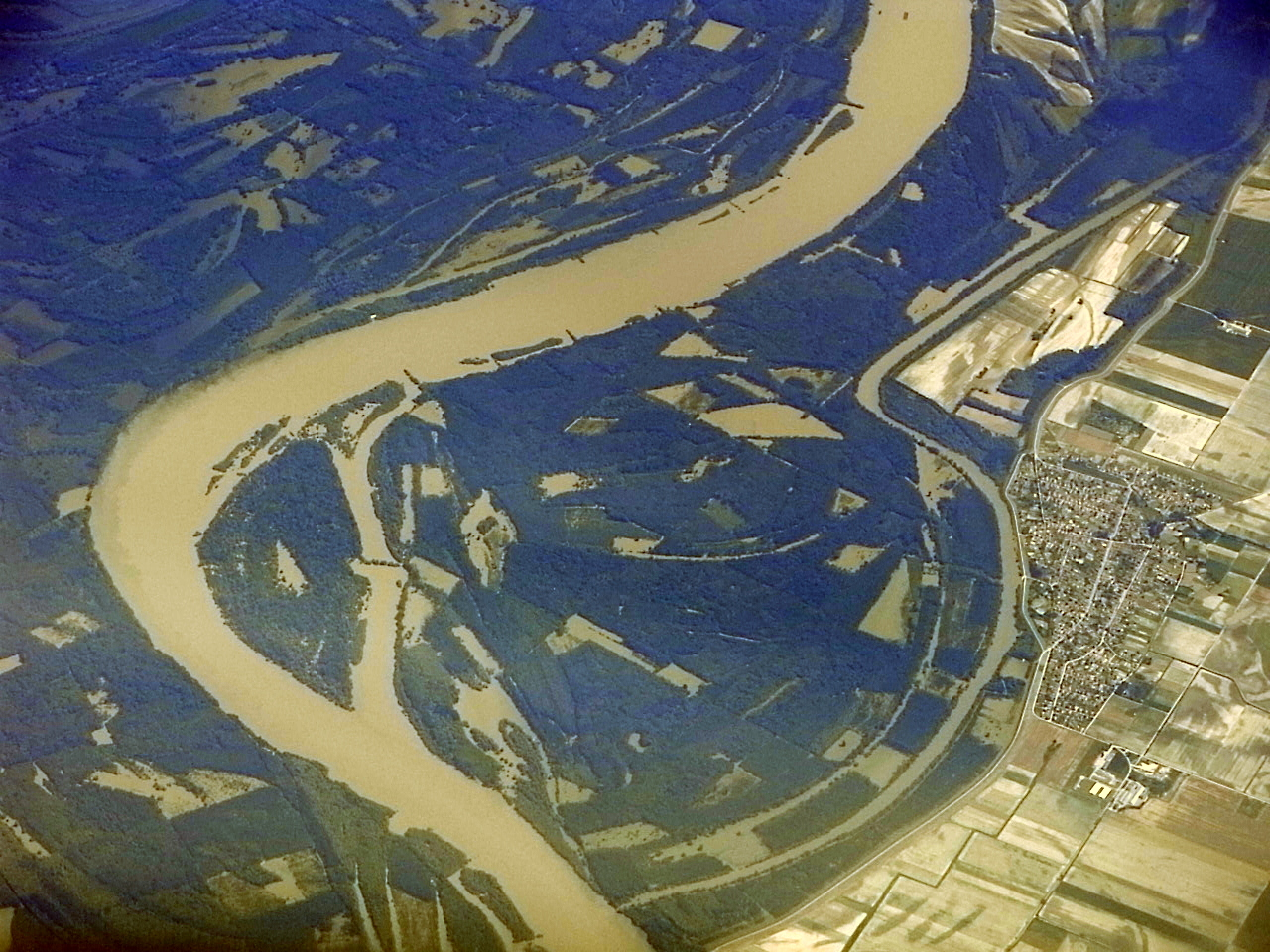
Aerial view of Danube river in Szeremle

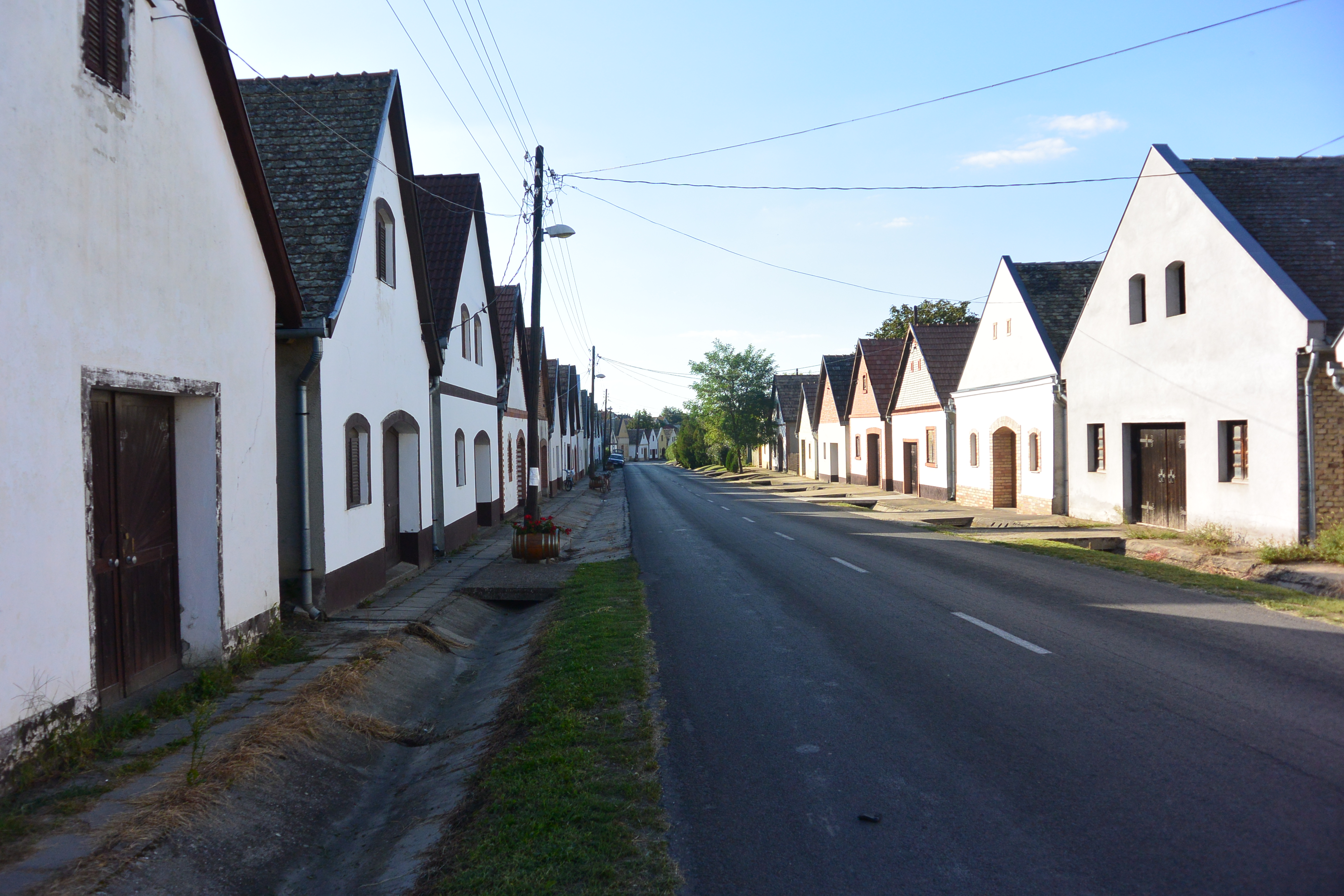
Wine cellars in Nemesnádudvar

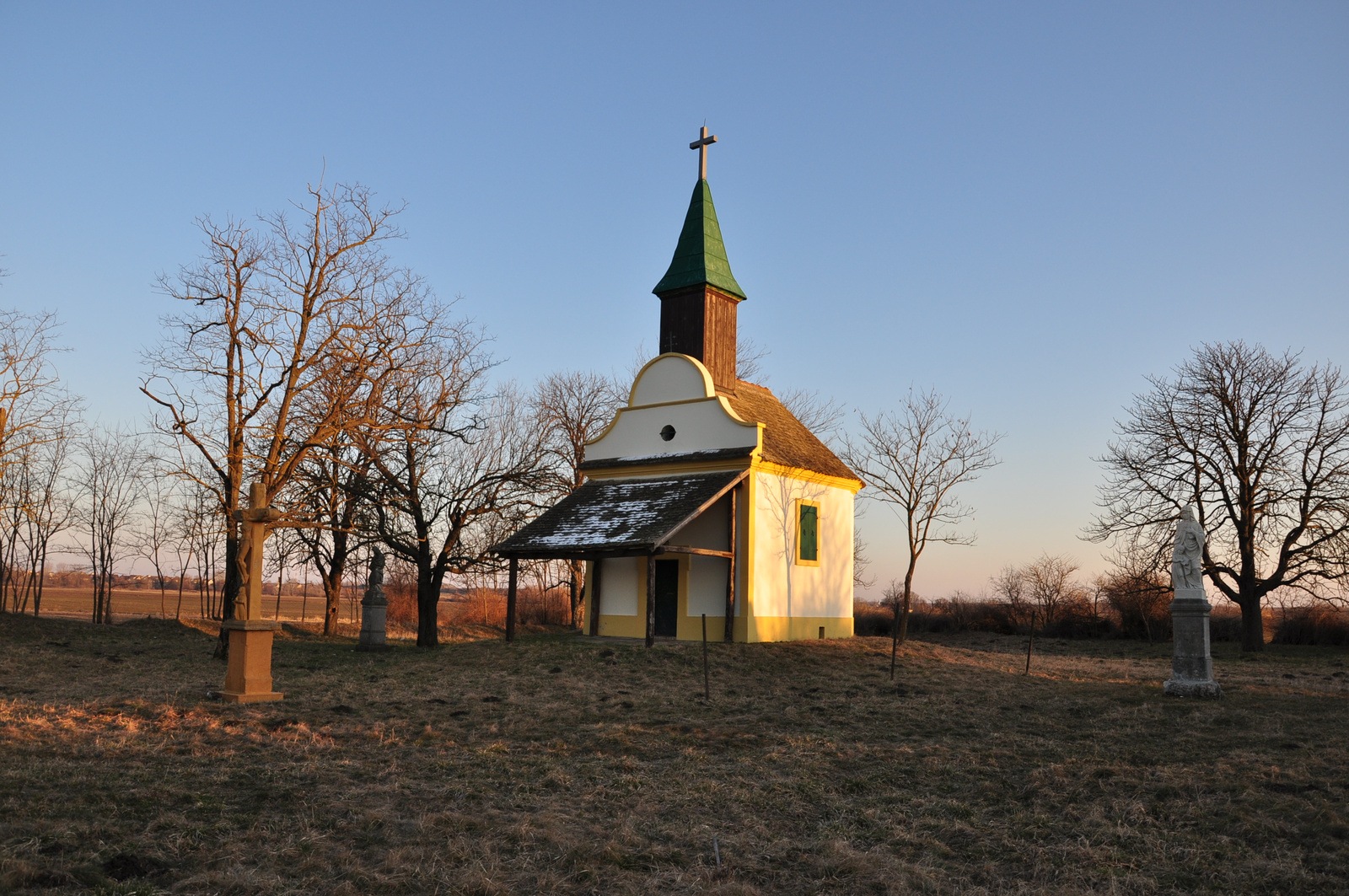
St. Anne Chapel in Sükösd

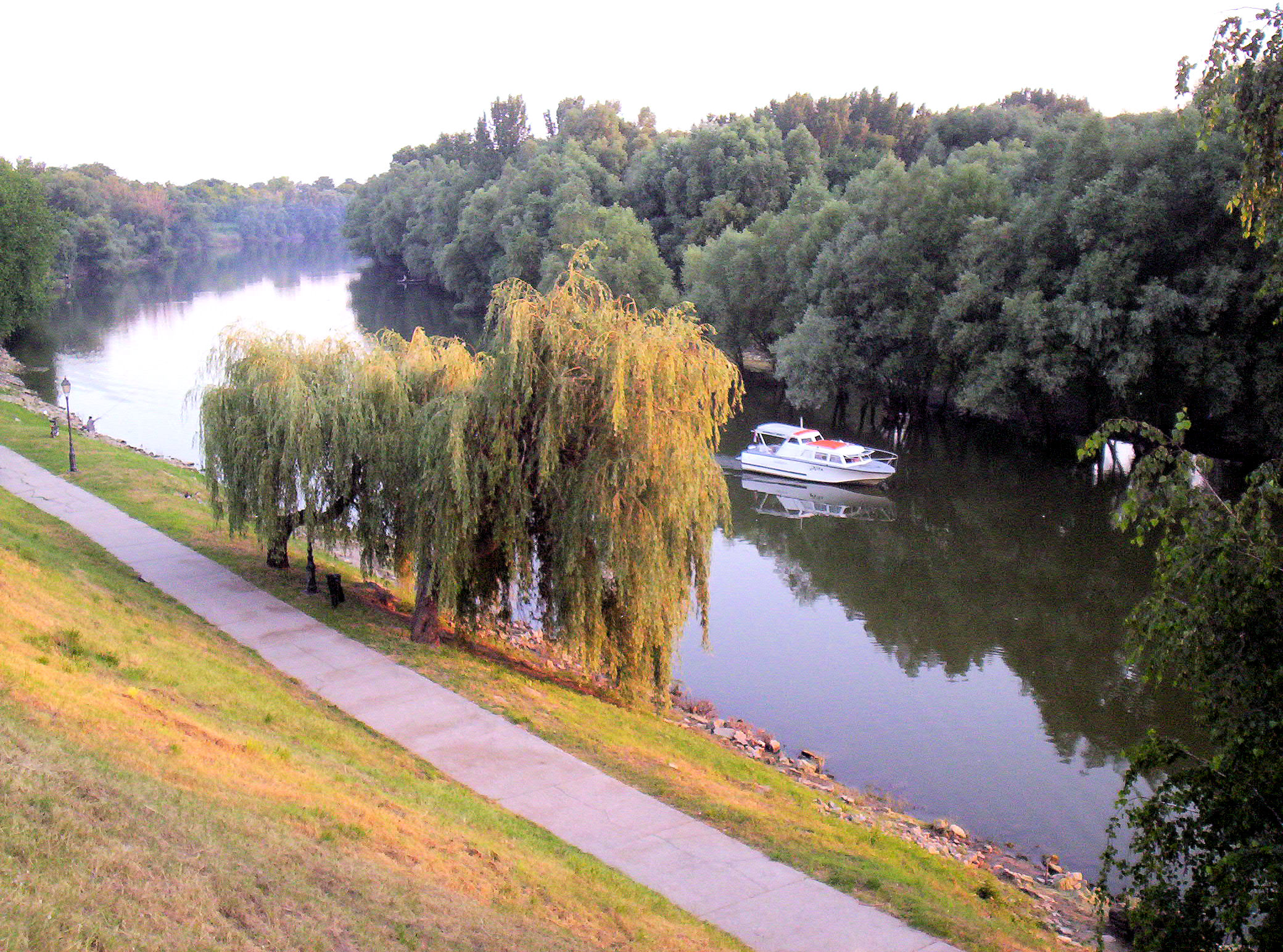
Sugovica river near Baja

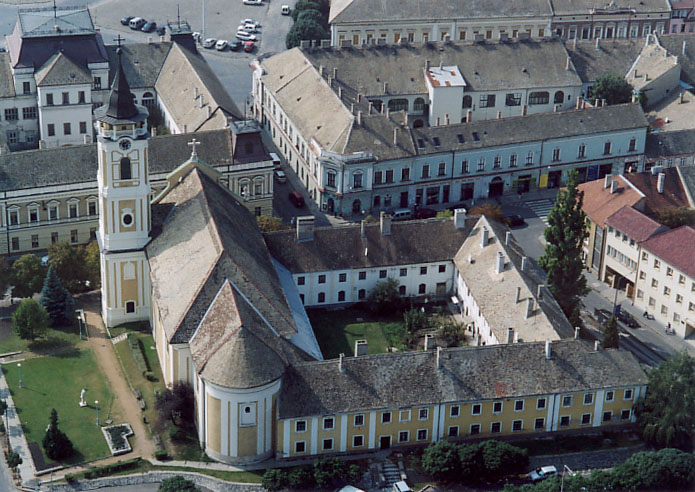
Franciscan Friary in Baja

== See also ==
- List of cities and towns of Hungary
