= Baja, Hungary =

Baja
- City with county rights
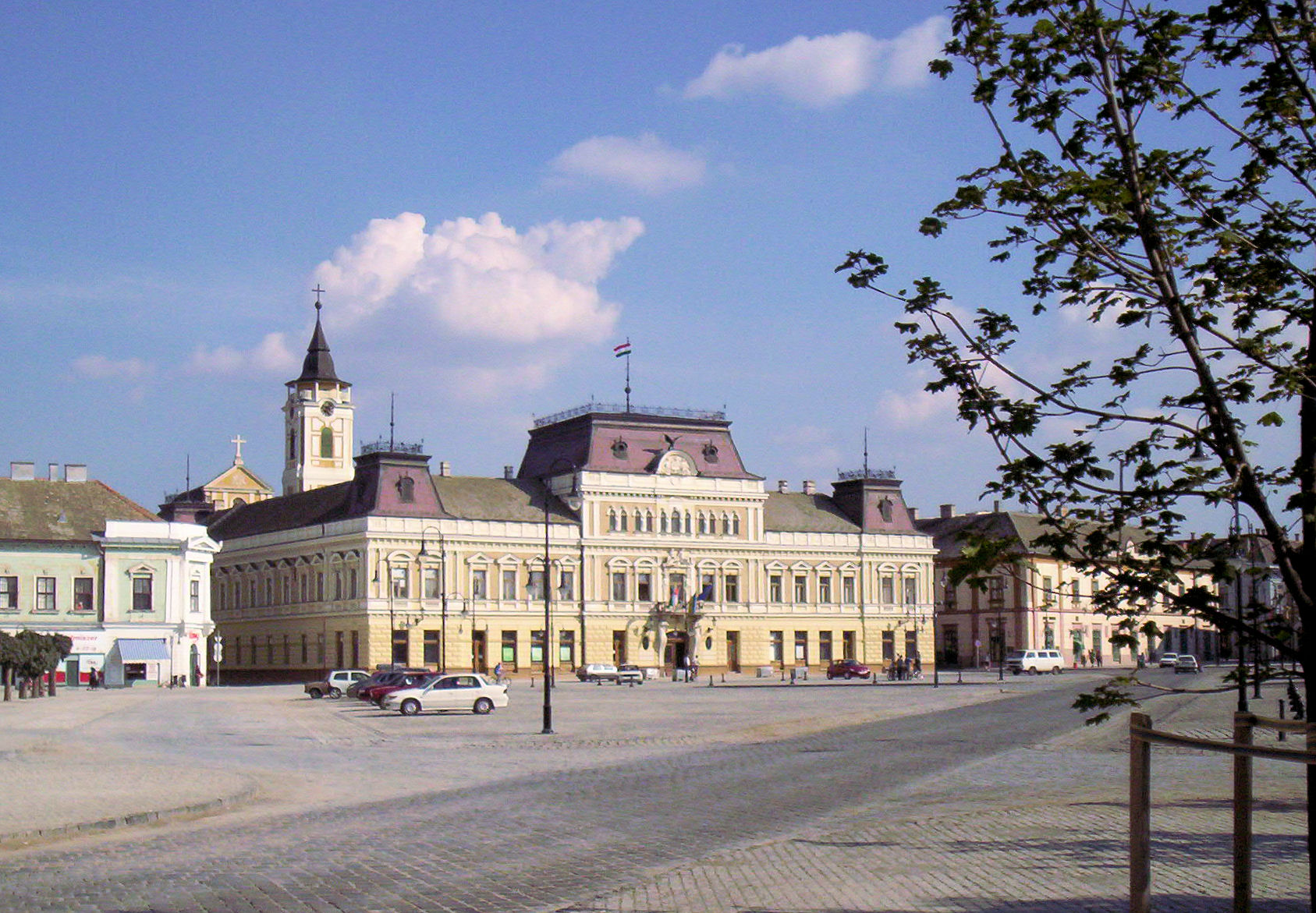
- Town hall

- Flag Coat of arms
- Nickname: The Capital of Fisherman's Soup
- Location in Hungary Baja (Europe)
- Coordinates: 46°10′47″N 18°57′11″E
- Country: Hungary
- Region: Southern Great Plain
- County: Bács-Kiskun
- District: Baja

Government
  - Mayor: Klára Nyirati (Sikeres Bajáért Egyesület)

Area
  - Total: 177.61 km^{2} (68.58 sq mi)
  - Rank: 20th in Hungary

Population (2023)
  - Total: 33,142
- Demonym: bajai

Population by ethnicity
  - Hungarians: 83.4%
  - Germans: 4.3%
  - Croats: 2.1%
  - Gypsies: 1.2%
  - Serbs: 0.5%
  - Romanians: 0.2%
  - Slovaks: 0.1%
  - Bulgarians: 0.1%
  - Others: 0.8%

Population by religion
  - Roman Catholic: 47.9%
  - Greek Catholic: 0.1%
  - Calvinists: 3.3%
  - Lutherans: 0.6%
  - Jews: 0.1%
  - Other: 2.7%
  - Non-religious: 16.0%
  - Unknown: 29.2%
- Postal code: 6500
- Area code: 79
- Website: www.bajaionkormanyzat.hu

Baja (Hungarian pronunciation: [ˈbɒjɒ]) is a city with county rights in Bács-Kiskun County, southern Hungary. It is the second-largest city in the county, after the county seat of Kecskemét, and is home to some 35,000 people. Baja is the seat of Baja Municipality.

The Baja region has been continuously inhabited since the end of the Iron Age, but there is evidence of human presence since prehistoric times. The settlement itself was most likely established in the 14th century. After the Ottoman Empire conquered Hungary, it grew to prominence more than the other nearby settlements, and it was granted town rights in 1696.

Today, Baja plays an important role in the life of Northern Bácska as a local commercial centre and the provider of public services such as education and healthcare. It has several roads and a railway connection to other parts of the country and also offers local public transport for its residents. Being close to the Danube and the forest of Gemenc and having its own cultural sights, Baja has become a candidate for tourism, which, however, is not well established yet.

== Etymology ==
The city's Hungarian name is probably derived from a Turkic language. The commonly-used "bull" name is likely not its real origin but may be from the first owner of the city, Baja. The Latin name of the town is Francillo. Baja also used to have a German name, Frankenstadt.

The South Slavs, both Bunjevci and Serbs, who live in the city call Baja, and the Hungarians use the same name, but the use former a slightly different pronunciation: ([baja], instead of [bɒjɒ]). In the Serbian Cyrillic alphabet, the name is Баја.

== History ==
The city was first mentioned in 1308. The Bajai family was the first known owner of the town. In 1474, the settlement was given to the Czobor family by Matthias Corvinus.

During the 16th-to-17th-century Ottoman conquest, it was the official centre for the region, and it had fortification. The era saw the migration of Bunjevci and Serbs to the town. There was also an active Franciscan mission, with monks from Bosnia.

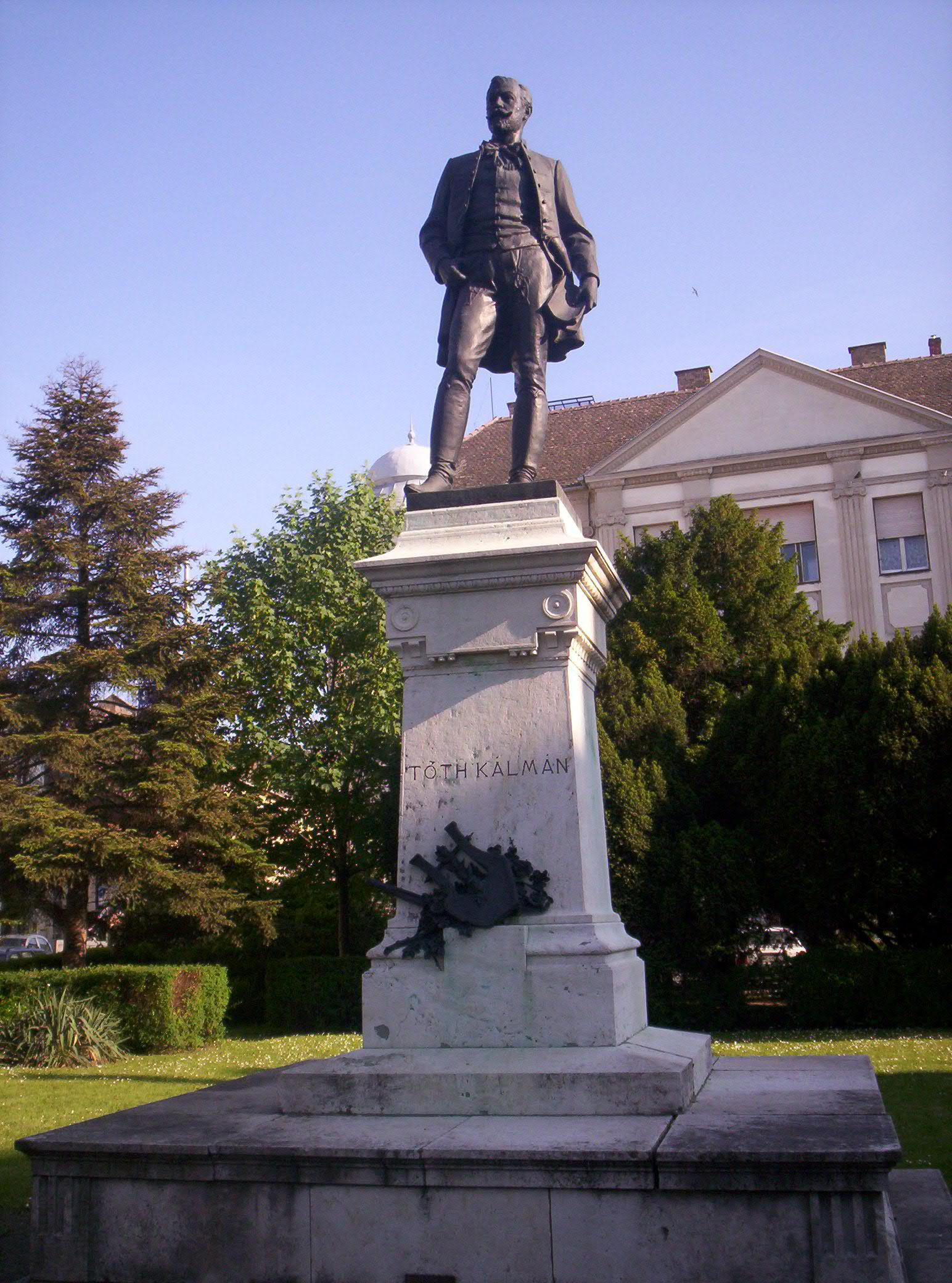
Kálmán Tóth Square, Baja

During the 18th century, Hungary, with its regained territories, was part of the Habsburg Empire. Germans, Hungarians and Jews migrated to the town. Its location on the Danube made it become a transportation and commercial hub for the region, where grain and wine were loaded onto boats to be transported upriver to Austria and Germany. In 1727, the Czobor family regained its ownership. Until 1765, the inhabitants belonged to three nations: the Bunjevac (called the Dalmatians), the Germans and the Serbs. A government decree later caused Natio Dalmatica to be changed to Natio Hungarica, but even in 1768, the elected mayor swore the oath in the Bunjevac language in the Franciscan Church.

In 1699, Baja was Bács-Kiskun County's most industrialized city.

In the 19th century, Baja became a minor railway hub, but its importance declined when the railway to Fiume (Rijeka) was built to trasnport Hungarian grain across the city. The city remained a commercial and service centre for the region.

In 1918, after the First World War, the ceasefire line placed the city under administration of the newly-formed Kingdom of Yugoslavia. The 1920 Treaty of Trianon assigned the city to Hungary, and it became the capital of the reduced Bács-Bodrog County.

After the Second World War the city became known for both its textile mill and the important bridge crossing the Danube. The city's importance is still evident as people from the Bácska (Serbian: Bačka) region of Hungary come to it for higher education and government and business services.

=== Historical population ===
Population growth in Baja, 1870–2005

The city's population grew rapidly in the 20th century (especially during the interwar period and during the socialist era), but in the last decade, the population has declined significantly.

Here is the demographic evolution of Baja:

Year	Population
1870	21,248
1910	24,588
1920	22,522
1941	32,084
1949	27,936
1960	30,263
1970	35,575
1980	38,523
1990	38,686
2001	38,360
2008	37,573
2019	34 495

== Demographics ==
The city has 33,142 residents as of 1 January 2023, 16% larger than the population of the 2001 Census, which reported ethnicity as follows:

- 93.5% Hungarians
- 2.7% Germans
- 1.3% Croats
- 0.4% Serbs
- 0.1% Slovaks
- 0.5% Romani people
- 6.1% unknown or did not say.

As of 1 January 2019, there are 17 149 houses.

== Geography ==
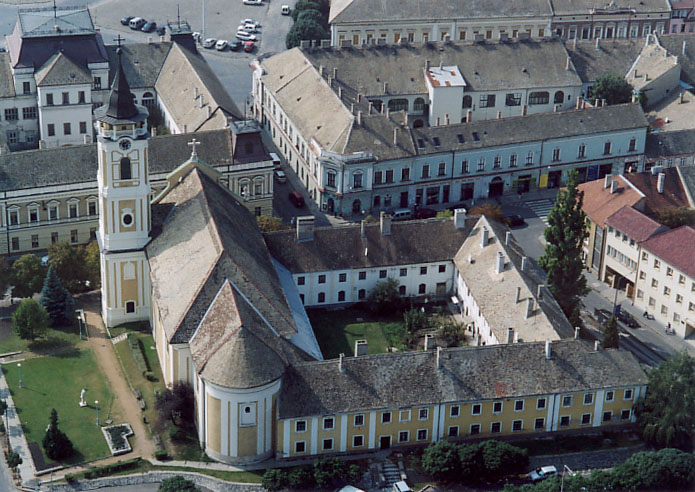
The Franciscan Monastery

=== Location ===
Baja is located about 150 km (93 mi) south of Budapest and 108 km (67 mi) south-west of Kecskemét and has Road 55 and Road 51 cross on the Danubeé Baja is at the meeting point of two large regions, the Great Hungarian Plain (Alföld) and the Transdanubia (Dunántúl), which are separated by the Danube separates the two regions. Baja's main river is the Sugovica (also called the Kamarás-Duna).

The western part of the city has the Gemenc forest start to spread out next to the István Türr Bridge. The forest is part of the Danube-Drava National Park and can be reached from Baja via a narrow gauge railway.
Baja is located on the left bank of the river, on the Great Hungarian Plain. However, Baja is more similar to the cities of Transdanubia. To the east, arable crops such as maize, wheat and barley are grown.

=== Climate ===
Baja is at the meeting of the continental and mediterranean regions of Hungary. Summer is hot (temperatures sometimes reach 36–37 °C) and stifling, and extreme torrential rains are getting common in the region. Winter is cold and snowy. There is often rain in the spring.

Climate data for Baja, 1991−2020 normals
Month	Jan	Feb	Mar	Apr	May	Jun	Jul	Aug	Sep	Oct	Nov	Dec	Year
Record high °C (°F)	18.0 (64.4)	21.4 (70.5)	25.5 (77.9)	31.9 (89.4)	34.1 (93.4)	37.2 (99.0)	41.2 (106.2)	40.4 (104.7)	37.3 (99.1)	29.1 (84.4)	24.3 (75.7)	20.1 (68.2)	41.2 (106.2)
Mean daily maximum °C (°F)	4.0 (39.2)	6.8 (44.2)	12.5 (54.5)	18.9 (66.0)	23.7 (74.7)	27.3 (81.1)	29.4 (84.9)	29.4 (84.9)	23.6 (74.5)	17.9 (64.2)	10.7 (51.3)	4.3 (39.7)	17.4 (63.3)
Daily mean °C (°F)	−0.1 (31.8)	1.6 (34.9)	6.1 (43.0)	11.5 (52.7)	16.3 (61.3)	20.0 (68.0)	21.8 (71.2)	21.4 (70.5)	16.1 (61.0)	11.0 (51.8)	5.7 (42.3)	0.6 (33.1)	11.0 (51.8)
Mean daily minimum °C (°F)	−3.5 (25.7)	−2.8 (27.0)	0.4 (32.7)	4.6 (40.3)	9.5 (49.1)	13.1 (55.6)	14.5 (58.1)	14.2 (57.6)	10.1 (50.2)	5.6 (42.1)	1.7 (35.1)	−2.5 (27.5)	5.4 (41.7)
Record low °C (°F)	−26.6 (−15.9)	−26.1 (−15.0)	−22.5 (−8.5)	−8.0 (17.6)	−3.1 (26.4)	1.4 (34.5)	4.0 (39.2)	4.5 (40.1)	−0.1 (31.8)	−9.8 (14.4)	−15.2 (4.6)	−24.9 (−12.8)	−26.6 (−15.9)
Average precipitation mm (inches)	32.1 (1.26)	37.3 (1.47)	33.7 (1.33)	39.6 (1.56)	65.5 (2.58)	76.3 (3.00)	63.6 (2.50)	57.2 (2.25)	63.6 (2.50)	54.6 (2.15)	46.5 (1.83)	47.9 (1.89)	617.9 (24.33)
Average precipitation days (≥ 1 mm)	6.2	7.0	6.0	6.6	9.1	8.3	6.6	6.1	6.7	6.4	7.0	7.4	83.4
Average relative humidity (%)	85.5	80.3	71.4	66.7	69.9	70.9	68.3	69.6	76.1	80.9	86.8	87.6	76.2
Source: NOAA

== Economy ==
The city plays an important role in the country's water transport on the Danube and has the second most important port of Hungary. Baja has to an extensive corporation: to AXIÁL Co. Axiál sells agricultural machines all over Eastern Europe with great success. Gemenc Forest and Game Co. Ltd. is managing the nearby nature reserve, Gemenc. There are numerous commercial structures in the city, which prove important to the people living in and around Baja. Roughly 10 years ago a TESCO supermarket opened along with a shopping centre next to it.

== Culture and education ==
The city has some museums and art galleries, most of them with permanent exhibitions. They include the István Türr Museum (exhibits objects of historical local life), the István Nagy Gallery (a collection of István Nagy's paintings), and the Bunjevci House (about Bunjevci traditions). The annual Fisherman's Soup Boiling Festival is a famous event in Europe and includes a great fish soup boiling contest and other cultural events.

Located relatively close to the Great Hungarian Plain, to Gemenc and Transdanubia, the city is also used as a base for regional tourists.

There are three notable educational institutes in the city: Béla III High school and the Eötvös József College. A smaller observatory also exists. There is the MNÁMK (Magyarországi Németek Általános Művelődési Központja; English: General Culture Center of Germans Living in Hungary).

== Religion ==
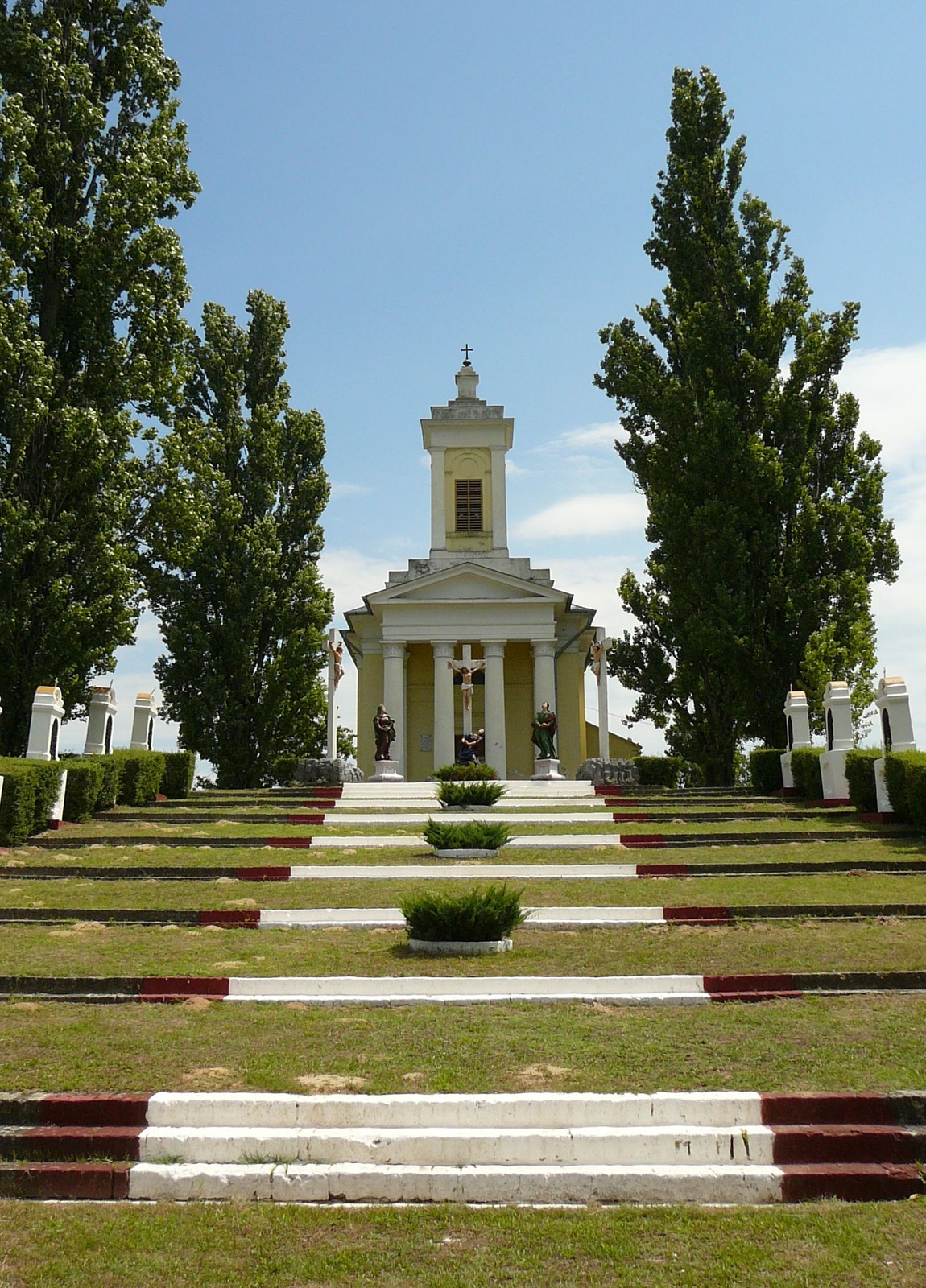
Calvary Chapel in Baja

There are 15 churches in the city, representing the religion of each ethnicity. These religions include (with the number of believers) Roman Catholic (25 203), Protestant (1 623), Evangelist (268), Unitarian, Orthodox (90), Lutheran and Judaism (27).

=== Endre Ady Library ===
Baja's library got its name from the famous Hungarian poet, Endre Ady. The library's building used to be Baja's synagogue. The building was offered by the city's Jewish community. The Holocaust appreciation memorial stands in the synagogue's garden.

The library has a very large collection of pre-18th-century books. The "Ancient book" collection includes 4,352 volumes, and a lot more writings, because many of the volumes are collectives (for example, one of them contains 17 writings). The library has three incunabulums.

== Current and past residents in Baja ==
- Bogoboj Atanacković (1826–1858), well-known Serbian novelist and friend of the poet Branko Radičević
- Ede Telcs, sculptor
- Emma Sándor, composer, wife of Zoltán Kodály
- Gavrilo Popović, Bishop of Šabac, Rector of Lyceum and the catechist of Belgrade
- Ibolya Dávid, politician of the Hungarian Democratic Forum
- István Türr, general under Giuseppe Garibaldi
- Joakim Vujić, known as the "Father of Serbian Theatre", writer and playwright who lived and worked in the late-18th and early-19th centuries
- Jovan Pačić (1771–1849), Serbian writer, poet, translator, illustrator and watercolor painter, the first to translate Goethe in Serbian
- Kálmán Tóth, 19th-century poet
- Karl Isidor Beck, Austrian poet and writer of the poem The Blue Danube
- Lázár Mészáros, Hungary's first defence minister
- Lukijan Bogdanović, Serbian Patriarch (1908-1913)
- Pavel Đurković, famous Serbian icon painter and muralist who lived and worked in the Habsburg Empire from 1772 to 1830
- Rajko Tomović, Serbian scientist
- Radovan Jelašić, governor of the National Bank of Serbia
- János Rácz (1941–2023), Hungarian basketball player
- Teodosije Mraović, Metropolitan of the Eastern Orthodox Church in the Kingdom of Serbia from 1883 to 1889

== Gallery ==
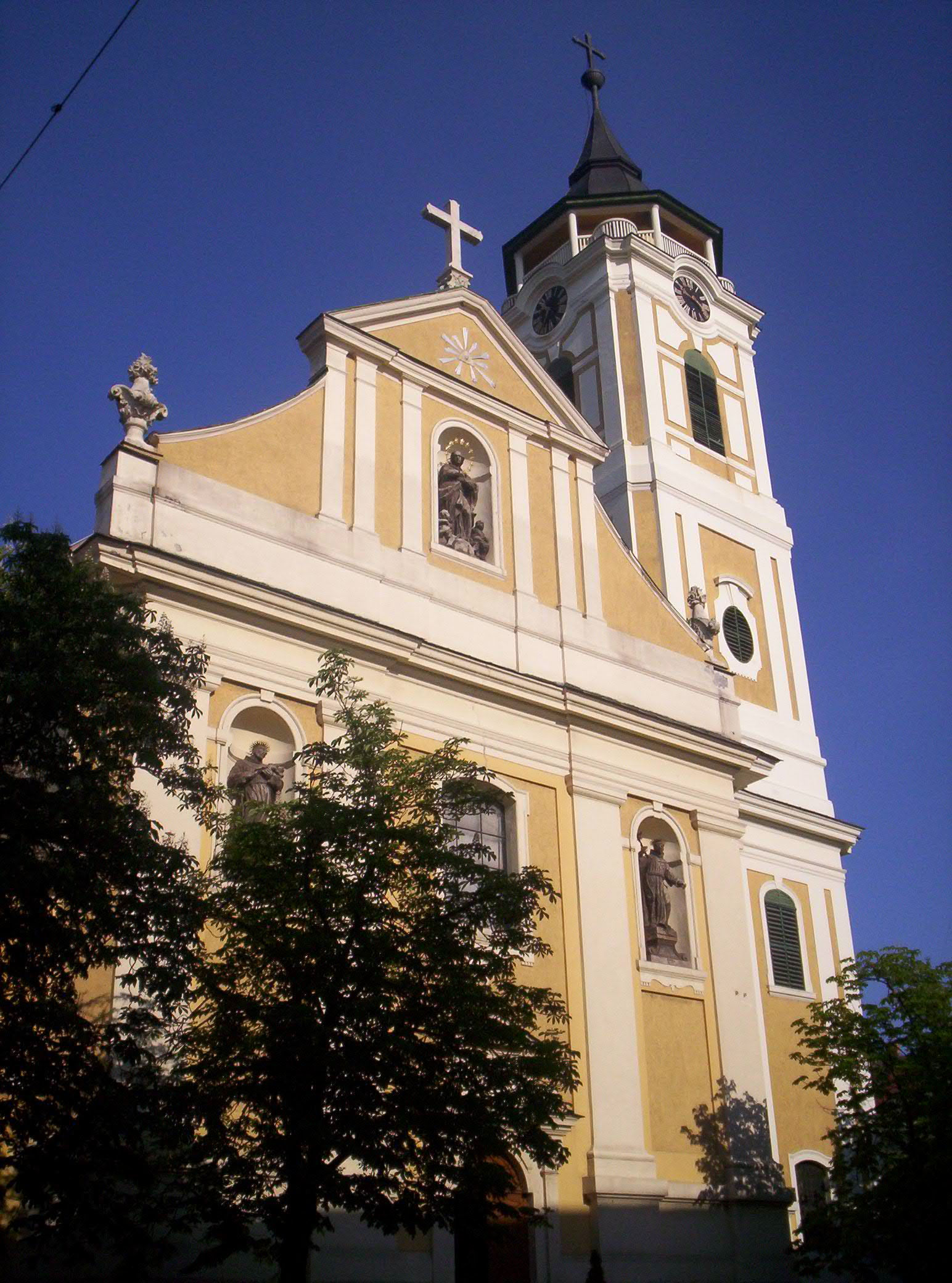
Franciscan Monastery

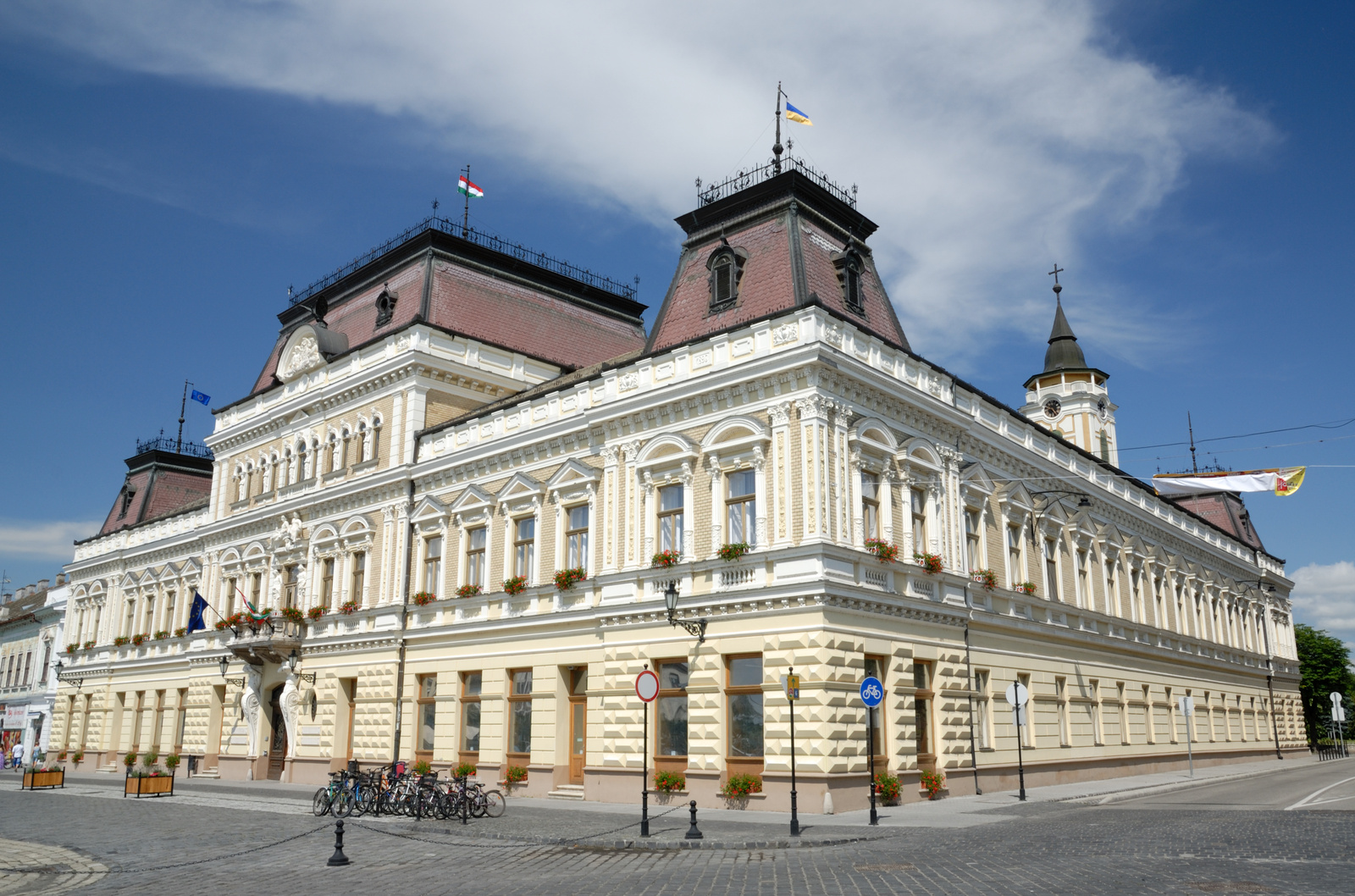
Town Hall

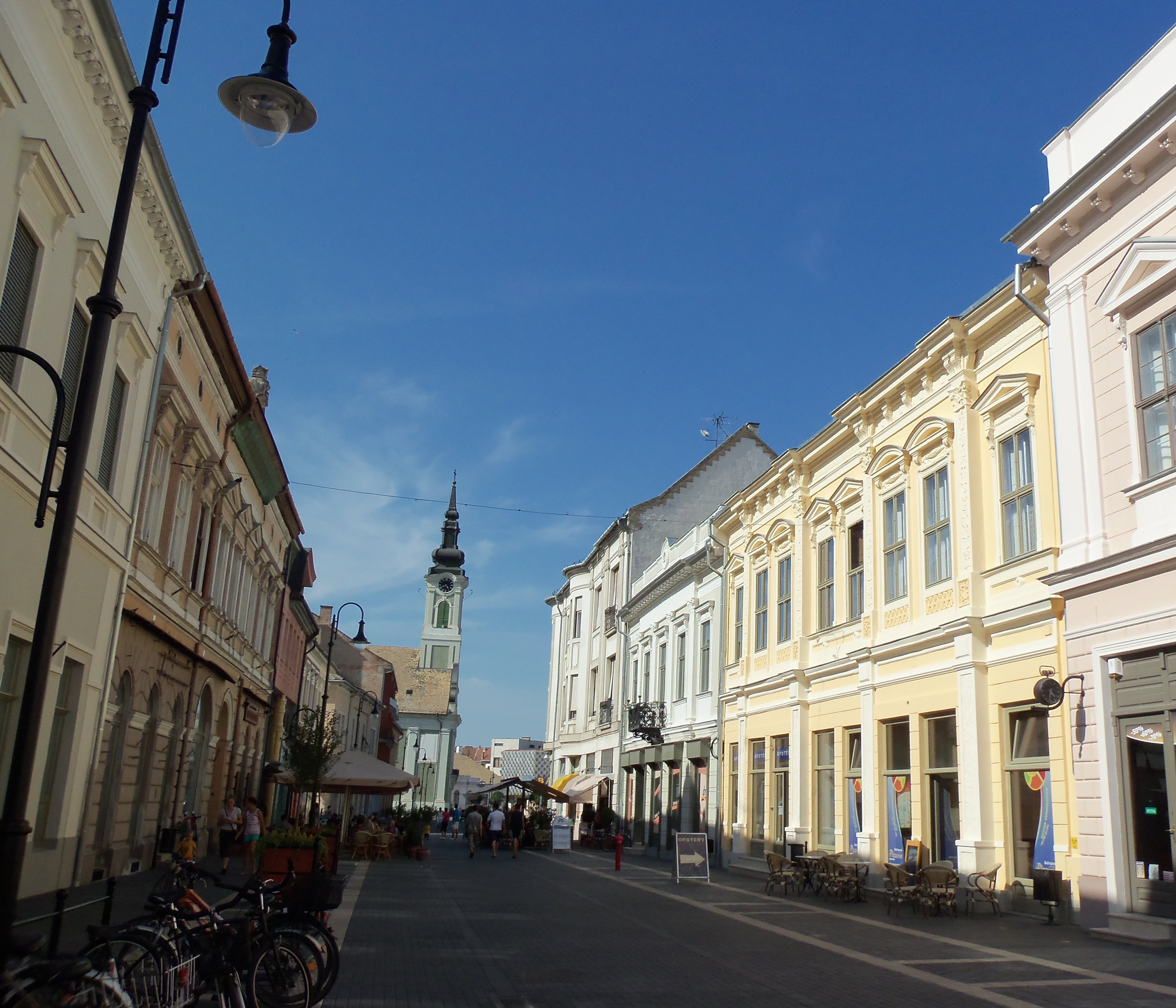
Eötvös street

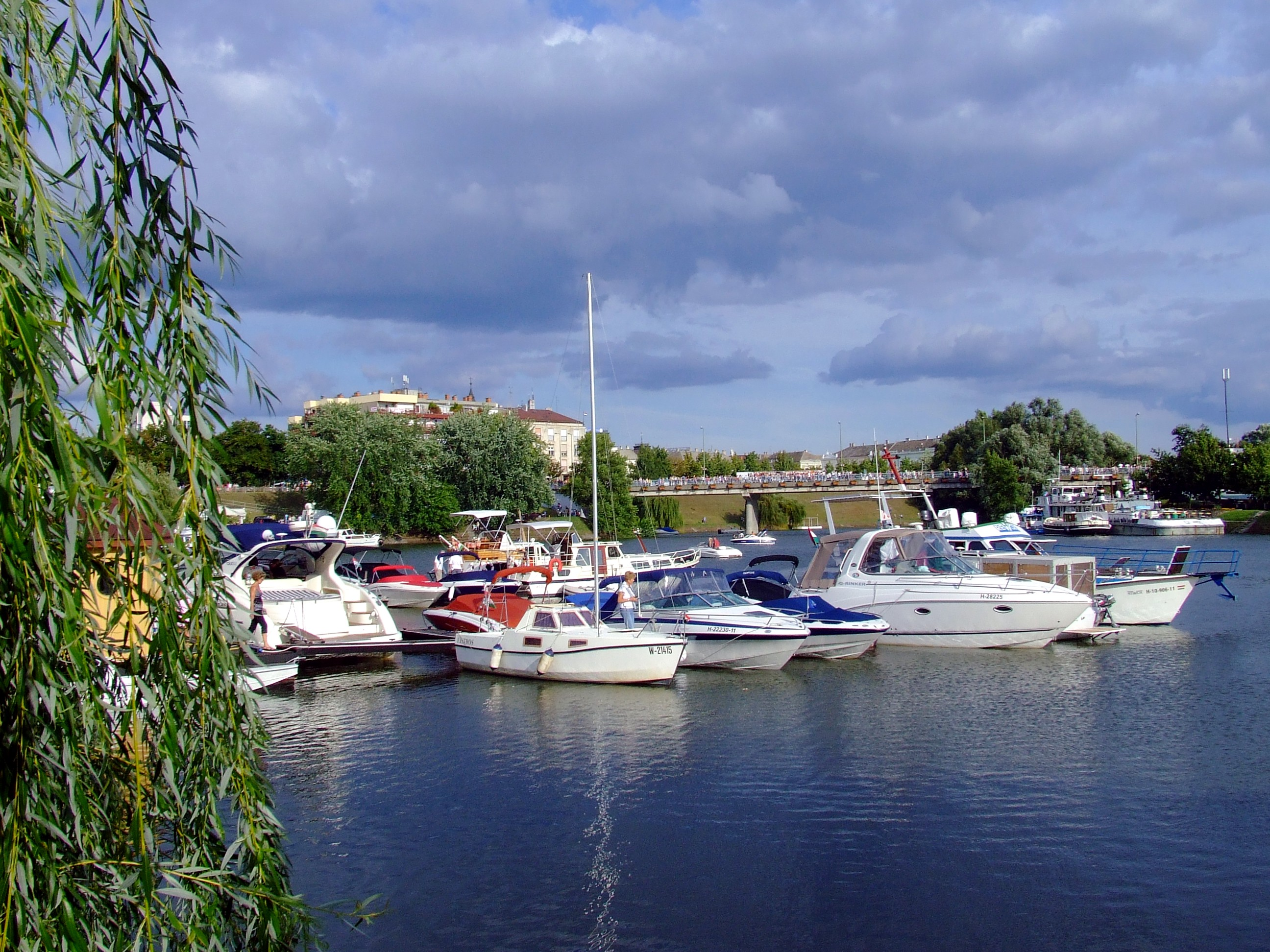
Sugovica yacht harbor

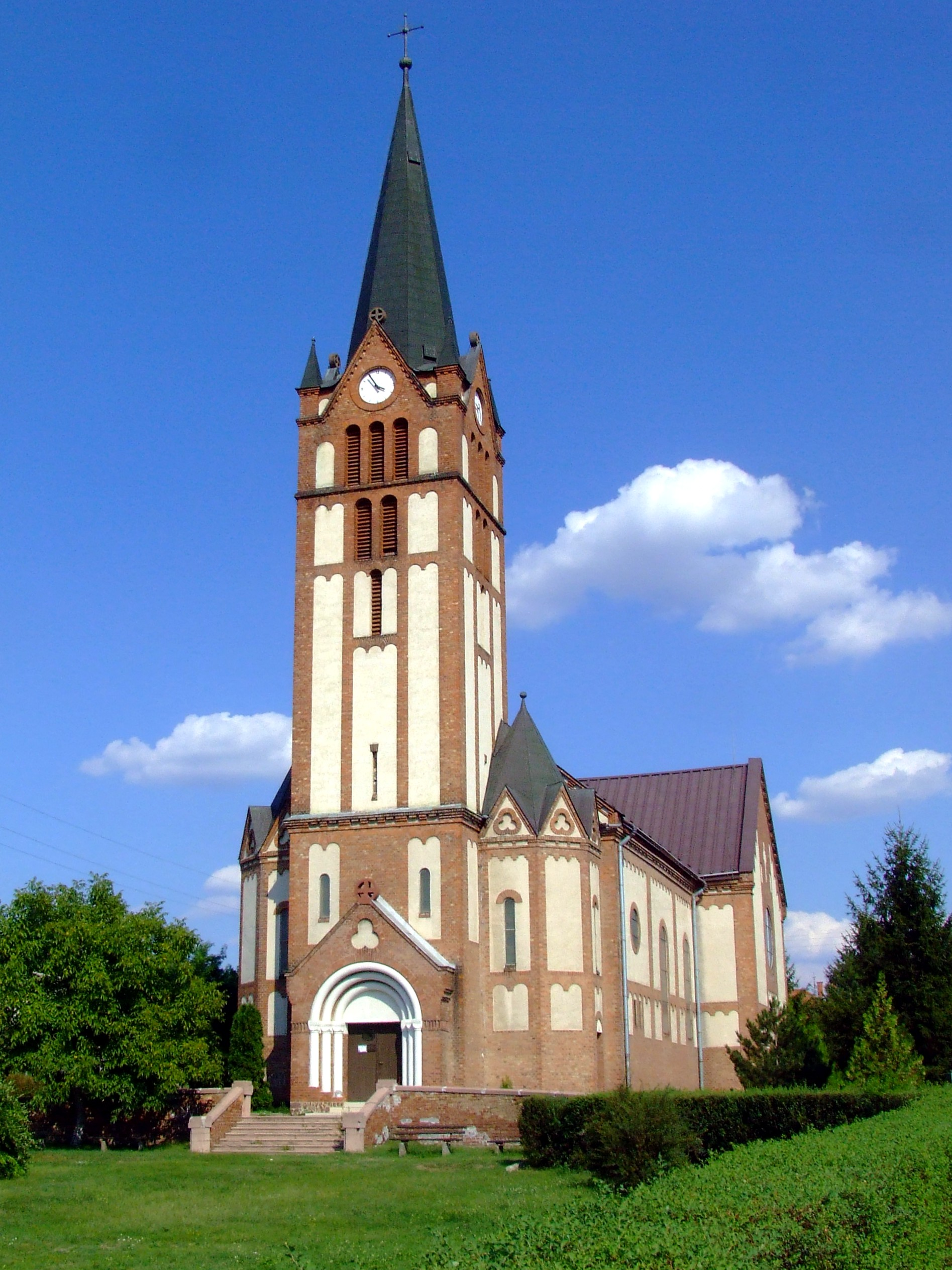
Sacred Heart church

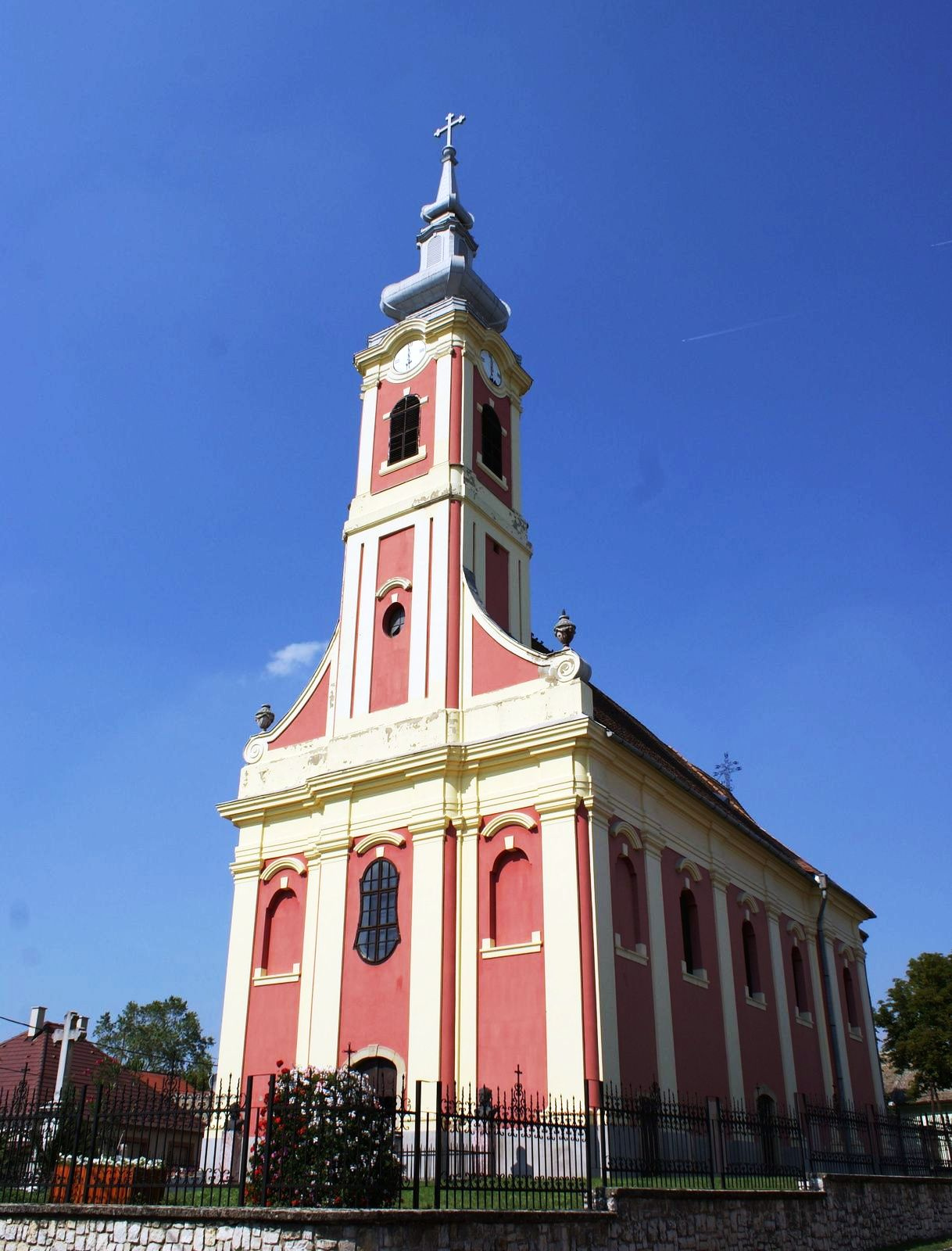
Serbian Orthodox Church of Saint Nicholas

== Twin towns – sister cities ==
Baja is twinned with:

- Argentan, France
- Hódmezővásárhely, Hungary
- Labin, Croatia
- Sângeorgiu de Pădure, Romania
- Sombor, Serbia
- Târgu Mureş, Romania
- Thisted, Denmark
- Waiblingen, Germany

== Nearby villages ==
- Pörböly
- Dunafalva
- Érsekcsanád
- Gara
- Vaskút
- Csávoly
- Szeremle
- Bátmonostor
- Dávod
- Hercegszántó

=== See also ===
- Serbian-Hungarian Baranya-Baja Republic

=== Sources ===
- Nemzeti és etnikai kisebségek Magyarországon, Budapest 1998
- Baja története. Akadémiai Kiadó, Budapest 1989

=== Official sites ===
- (in Hungarian) Baja's public homepage
- (in Hungarian and English) Official site of the local government

=== Web cameras ===
- Baja, Danube bridge

=== Additional links ===
- Official website in Hungarian
- (in English and Hungarian) Ady Endre Library's home page
- (in English and Hungarian) Observatory Home Page
- (in Hungarian) Baja sport news
- (in Hungarian) bajastory.info magazine
- Magnifiable city map
- Aerial photographs from Baja
