= Bede Lackner =

American-Hungarian theologian

Bede Lackner (December 19, 1927 – November 10, 2020) was a Hungarian-American, Catholic priest and monk of the Cistercian Order. He was a theologian and historian.

== Biography ==
=== Flight from Hungary, theological studies, and priestly ordination ===
Fr. Bede was born Károly (Karl) János Lackner in Vaskút, in southern Hungary, to Stefan Lackner and Elisabeth Rutscher. They were so-called Danube Swabians who had been brought into Hungary mainly in the eighteenth century to repopulate it after the expulsion of the Ottoman Turks. He entered the Cistercian Order in 1947 at the Abbey of Zirc after attending a school run by Cistercians in Baja for eight years. He studied philosophy and theology in Zirc in the years immediately before its dissolution by the Communist regime on October 15, 1950. Facing violent persecution, many of his confreres went to Rome; others moved to the US and eventually founded Our Lady of Dallas Cistercian Abbey.

Fr. Bede left Hungary for Bavaria with his parents on November 17, 1950, because it was in the American zone of West Germany. His parents remaining in Schweinfurt, Karl departed for Rome a month later and enrolled at the Anselmianum. In January 1953 he was called to join his brother monks in the United States. First, he was ordained a priest in the Capuchin church of St. Fidelis in Feldkirch, sponsored by the Cistercian monks of Mehrerau Abbey. He emigrated to the United States a few weeks later, arriving first in the monastery at Spring Bank, Wisconsin, and then moving on to join the new foundation in the Dallas suburb of Irving, Texas.

=== Doctoral studies and university teaching ===
Fr. Bede finished his M.A. at Marquette in 1959, writing a thesis on “Abbot Stephen Harding and the Rise of Cîteaux.” In 1961, he enrolled in doctoral studies in history at Fordham University in New York and wrote his dissertation on The Eleventh-Century Background of Cîteaux, which was published in 1972. Writing in The Catholic Historical Review, Edward C. Bock called it "masterful": The author's precision and methodology allowed him to "weave a magnificent path from Benedict of Aniane to Cîteaux."

Fr. Bede's academic career moved quickly. Along with lecturing at the University of Dallas and assisting at the Cistercian Prep School, in 1967 he began teaching Church history at Holy Trinity Seminary in Irving, Texas. He taught there for fifteen years and was admired by many as a teacher, spiritual director, confessor, and friend for many alumni. In 1969 he was hired as a professor of history at the University of Texas at Arlington; after three years, in 1972, he was granted tenure there. He continued to teach full-time until his retirement in 2001, but even in retirement taught for another ten years.

Lackner wrote, contributed to, or edited a dozen books, and produced a steady stream of essays, translations, book reviews, and conference papers. Although his focus was medieval and monastic history, his work covered many aspects of early modern history.

Fr. Bede suffered a stroke on 20 November 2019. Although he recovered remarkably, he died almost a year afterward as a result of kidney failure.

== Publications (a selection) ==
- "A Cistercian of royal blood: Blessed Teresa of Portugal", in Vox Benedictina: A Journal of Translations from Monastic Sources 6.2 (1989): 100–19.
- as editor with Gary D. Stark: Essays on Culture and Society in Modern Germany. Foreword by Leonard Krieger. (Walter Prescott Webb Memorial Lectures, number 15.) College Station: Texas A&M University Press, 1982.
- Entries in the Regesta Imperii bibliography.
