= Tüske =

Tüske is a Hungarian surname meaning thorn. Notable people with the surname include:

- Ferenc Tüske (born 1942), Hungarian volleyball player
- Roland Tüske (born 1977), Hungarian footballer
