= Petar Pekić =

Hungarian-Croatian historian and writer

Petar Pekić (Hungarian: Pékity Péter; Felsőszentiván, Kingdom of Hungary, 1896 – 1965) was a Hungarian-Croatian historian, Slavist and writer from Bácska (Bačka).

The quality of his works opened him the place in the Geza Kikić's anthology of prose and poetry of Bunjevci Croats.

Petar Pekić was also an important person in politics. As a Bunjevci Croat from southern Hungary, he participated at the Paris Peace Conference on September 22, 1919, as a part of the Bunjevci Croat mission.

== Works ==
- translations
- Voltaire: Moj boravak u Berlinu, 1951.
- historical
- Povijest oslobođenja Vojvodine, Grafika, Subotica, 1939
- Vae victis : ili pobijanje kritike dra Dušana Popovića i Vase Stajića, Subotica, 1930
- Propast Austro-Ugarske Monarhije : i postanak nasljednih država, Grafika, Subotica, 1937
- Povijest Hrvata u Vojvodini : od najstarijih vremena do 1929. godine, Matica hrvatska, Zagreb, 1930
