= Bence Csontos =

Hungarian politician

Member of the National Assembly
- Incumbent
- Assumed office 9 May 2026
- Preceded by: Róbert Zsigó
- Constituency: Bács-Kiskun County 1st

Personal details
- Party: TISZA

Bence Csontos is a Hungarian politician who was elected member of the National Assembly in 2026. He previously worked in online advertising.
