= Róbert Zsigó =

Hungarian politician

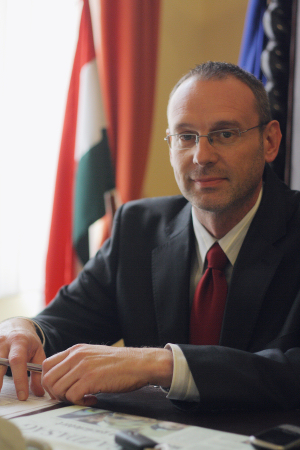

Member of the National Assembly
- Incumbent
- Assumed office 18 June 1998

Personal details
- Born: 10 November 1967 (age 58) Bácsalmás, Hungary
- Party: Fidesz (since 1991)
- Spouse: Rózsa Vörös
- Children: Tamás; Eszter; Bence
- Profession: politician

Róbert Zsigó (born 10 November 1967) is a Hungarian politician, who served as the mayor of Baja from 2010 to 2014. He has been a member of the National Assembly (MP) since 1998. In this capacity, he represented Baja (Bács-Kiskun County Constituency IX then VI) from 1998 to 2026. He was appointed Secretary of State for Food Chain Supervision on 15 June 2014.

== Career ==
Zsigó joined Fidesz in 1991, establishing its party branch in Bácsalmás. He was a member of the Bács-Kiskun County Assembly from 1996 to 1998. He became a local representative in Baja during the 2002 Hungarian local elections. He served as head of Fidesz party branch in Baja constituency from 2003 to 2021. Zsigó was elected MP for Baja seven times (1998, 2002, 2006, 2010, 2014, 2018, 2022). He served as a deputy leader of Fidesz parliamentary group from 2010 to 2014, 2022 to 2024 and since 2026. He was a member of the parliament's Foreign Affairs Committee and Youth and Sports Committee from 1998 to 2002; he chaired the latter's Subcommittee on Narcotics in the same period. He was involved in the Employment and Labor Committee from 2002 to 2006. He served as vice-chairman of the Education and Science Committee between 2006 and 2010 and of the Consumer Protection Committee between 2010 and 2014. He was briefly a member of the Foreign Affairs Committee in May 2014. During the short break between his government positions (see below), he was a member of the National Integration Committee (2022, 2023–2024) and the Sustainable Development Committee (2022–2023).

Zsigó served as Secretary of State for Food Chain Supervision between 15 June 2014 and 30 September 2020. Thereafter, he was appointed Parliamentary State Secretary to the Minister without Portfolio for Families Katalin Novák in the Prime Minister's Office. He served in this capacity until 24 May 2022. He served as deputy minister and parliamentary state secretary of the Ministry of Culture and Innovation, taking over from Eszter Vitályos, from 1 April 2024 to 12 May 2026.

Zsigó was defeated by Tisza candidate Bence Csontos in Baja constituency during the 2026 Hungarian parliamentary election. Nevertheless, he was selected as MP via the national list of Fidesz–KDNP by the party presidium. He was appointed chairman of the parliament's Social Committee.
