= Érsekhalma =

Village in Bács-Kiskun, Hungary

- Flag Coat of arms

- Location of Érsekhalma Érsekhalma (Hungary) Érsekhalma (Europe)
- Coordinates: 46.3500°N 19.1167°E
- Country: Hungary
- County: Bács-Kiskun
- District: Baja

Government
  - Mayor: Bekő Csaba (Ind.)

Area
  - Total: 27.56 km^{2} (10.64 sq mi)

Population (2022)
  - Total: 532
  - Density: 19.3/km^{2} (50.0/sq mi)
- Time zone: UTC+1 (CET)
  - Summer (DST): UTC+2 (CEST)
- Postal code: 6348
- Area code: 78

Érsekhalma (Croatian: Loma) is a village in Bács-Kiskun county, in the Southern Great Plain region of Hungary.

== Geography ==
It covers an area of 27.56 km^{2} (11 sq mi) and had a population of 532 people in 2022.

== Partnership ==
- Gheorghieni, Romania
- Šupljak, Serbia
- Veľká Ida, Slovakia
- Zwolle, Netherlands
