= Gemenc =

Coordinates: 46°15′11″N 18°53′11.4″E

Designations

Ramsar Wetland
- Designated: 30 April 1997
- Reference no.: 900

Gemenc is a unique forest that is found between Szekszárd and Baja, in Hungary. This is the only remaining tidal area of the Danube in Hungary. The wood's fauna include stags, boars, storks, grey herons, saker falcons, white-tailed eagles, and kites. Various amphibians and reptiles can also be found. The stag population has worldwide fame, since its genetic stock is outstanding, and the stags' antlers are impressive. Due to the various watery habitats, many fish species are present.

Close to the waters, willow and poplar forests are typical. It is the habitat of the curiosity Freyer's purple emperor (Hungarian: Magyar színjátszólepke). Furthermore, Gemenc is home to 13 other sheltered butterfly species.

Further from the rivers, large oak-ash-elm forests spread. These are the homes of the stag beetles, great pricorn beetles, as well as of a kind of spider which only lives in Gemenc.

Gemenc is a nature reserve that is part of the Danube-Drava National Park.

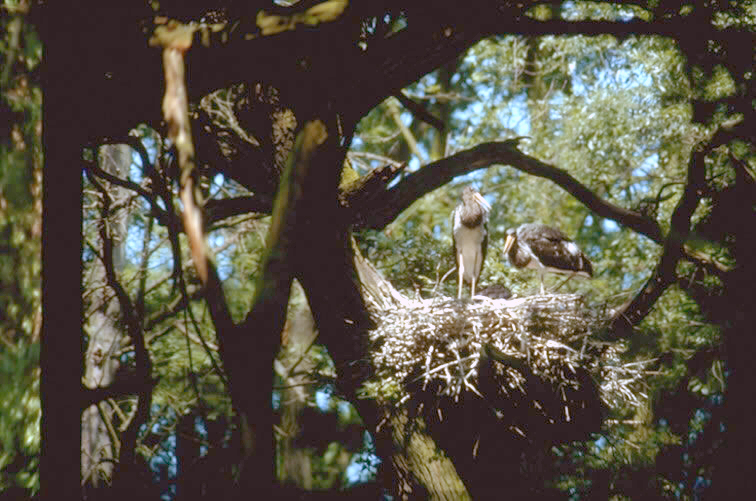
A nest in Gemenc

Property	Value
National park	Danube-Drava National Park
Country	Hungary
Establishment	1977
Territory	340 km^{2}; 177.79 km^{2} protected
% of stoutly protected	15.02%
Dimensions	In a 5–10 km wide band along the Danube in southern Hungary

Vignettes of specific species of the fauna of the sanctuary make up the film Gyöngyvirágtól lombhullásig [From Blossom Time to Autumn Frost] (1953) by nature documentary film-maker István Homoki Nagy.
