= Karl Isidor Beck =

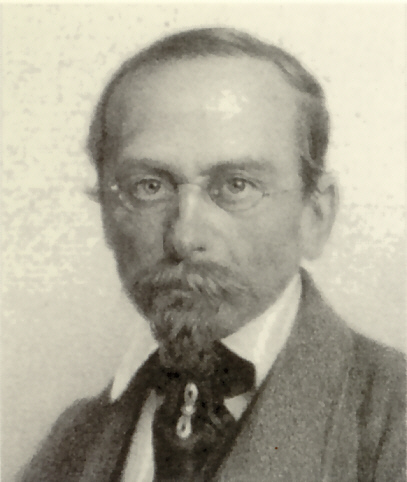

Karl Isidor Beck (Hungarian: Beck Károly Izidor; 1 May 1817, Baja – 10 April 1879, Vienna) was a Hungarian-Austrian poet.

The son of a Jewish merchant, he studied in Pest, Vienna and Leipzig. He lived in Berlin from 1844 until the outbreak of the Revolutions of 1848, and subsequently in Vienna, where he was an editor of the Lloyd.

== Works ==
His poetic writings interpret the national life and spirit of Hungary. Among his works are:

- Nächte, gepanzerte Lieder (Nights, armored lyrics; 1838), a collection of poems which was well received
- Stille Lieder (Quiet lyrics; 1839)
- Saul (Leipzig, 1841), a drama
- Jankó, der ungarische Rosshirt (Jankó, the Hungarian horse tender; Leipzig, 1842; 3d ed., 1870), a romance in verse that established his reputation, considered by some to be his best work
- Gesammelte Gedichte (Collected poems; Berlin, 1844; 9th ed. 1869)
- Lieder vom armen Mann (Songs of the Poor Man; Berlin, 1846)
- Aus der Heimat (From home; Dresden, 1852; 4th ed. 1862)
- Mater Dolorosa (Berlin, 1853), a novel
- Jadwiga (Leipzig, 1863), a tale in verse
- Elegieen (Vienna, 1869)
