= Jovan Pačić =

Serbian soldier, poet, writer, translator, illustrator and painter (1771–1849)

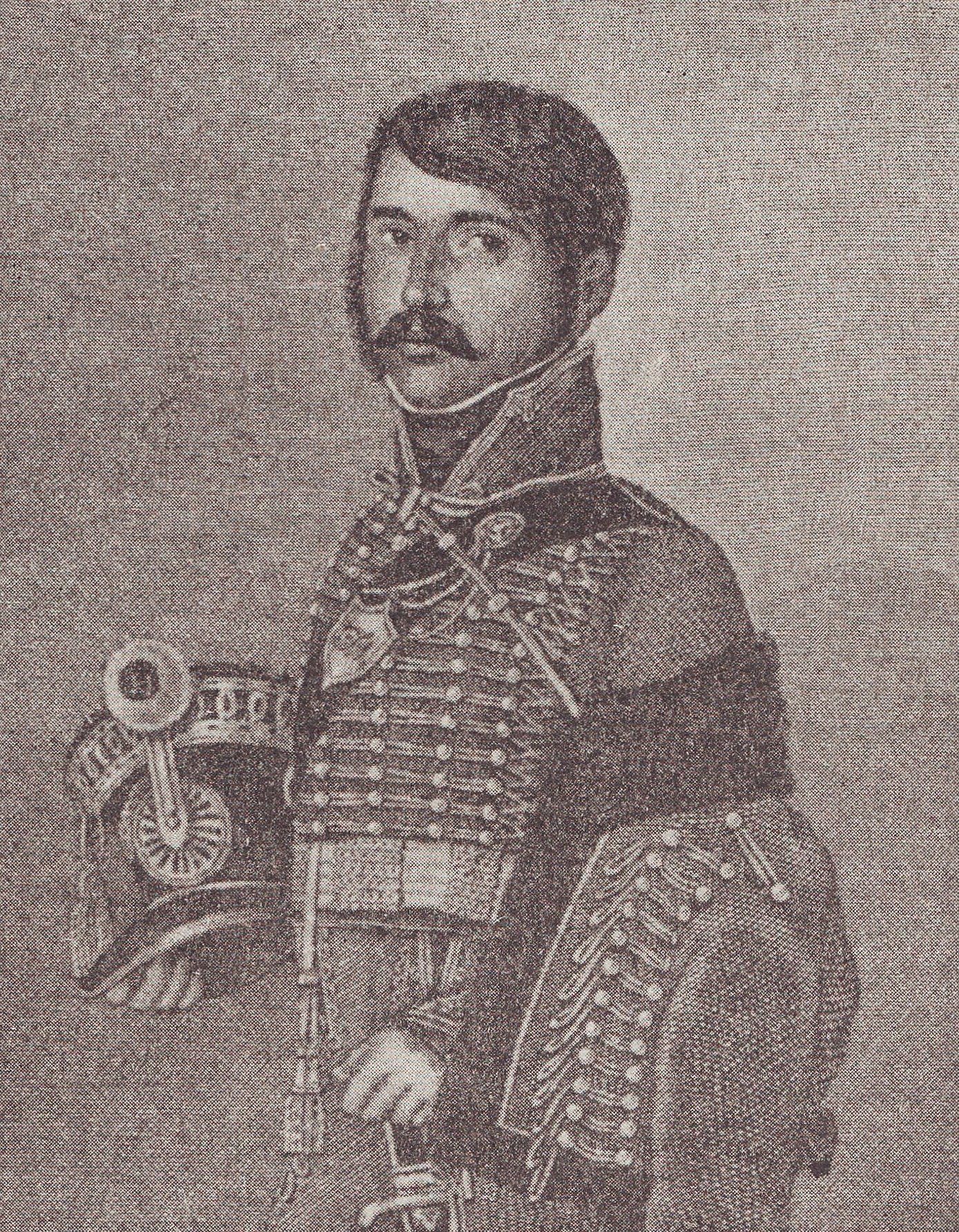
Jovan Pačić

Jovan Pačić (November 6, 1771, Baja - December 4, 1849 Budapest) was a Serbian soldier, painter and poet.

Jovan Pačić went to school in Kalocsa. In 1792 or 1793, he joined the army and fought against the French. In 1812 he suffered an injury when a sword cut through his mouth. He retired after a year of recuperation. As a retired cavalry captain, he moved to Novi Sad, and soon after settled in Győr in 1838. Jovan Pačić turned to painting and poetry in his leisure. He primarily painted landscapes and genre art. He was praised by his contemporaries.

== Works ==
Pačić published a lot of verses in the Letopis Matice Srpske, Peštansko Budimsko skoroteča, Srpski narodni list and other periodicals, journals and magazines. In 1827, he printed three volumes of Sočinenija pjenoslovska in Buda. In addition, he left behind numerous manuscripts, which later disappeared. Jovan Pačić's poems are about love, wine, military, odes, elegies and epigrams. Their external form is modeled after the contemporary German romantics. In 1828, Pačić, in cooperation with Jan Kolar, published the Imenoslov, ili, Rečnik ličny imena razny naroda slavenski (Nomenclature or dictionary of personal names of various Slavic peoples). A copy of the first edition of Imenoslov is now part of the Rare Book and Special Collections Reading Room of the Library of Congress.

Jovan Pačić spoke and read a dozen languages (among others, Latin, ancient Greek, Hebrew and Arabic), and was considered a rarely educated Serb, a nationalist, who had sympathy for the Illyrian movement, although he did not want to approach Vuk's reform. At the beginning of the 19th century, Buda and Pest were the center of Serbian literature, since Jovan Pačić, Sima Milutinović Sarajlija and Milovan Vidaković, as an authoritative literary triumvirate, developed their activity here in the community. Pačić is the first South Slavic writer who started translating Goethe.

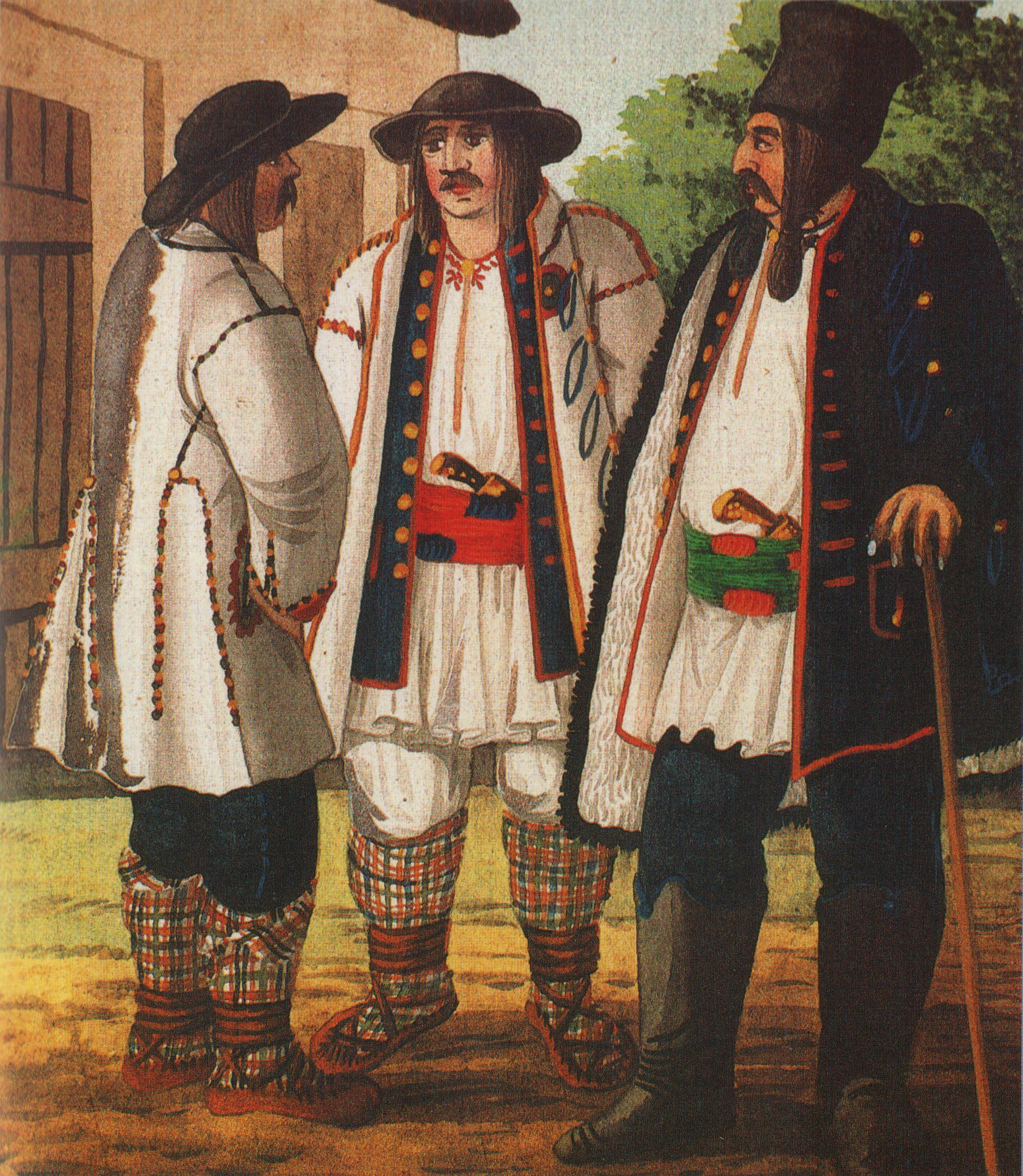
Serb clothes in Bačka by Jovan Pačić

== Sources ==
- Jaša Ignjatović, Tri spisatelja Srpska (Danica, 1860)
- Vlad. Nikolić, Jovan Pačić (Brankovo Kolo, 1902)
