= Ferenc Tüske =

Hungarian volleyball player (born 1942)

Personal information
- Nationality: Hungarian
- Born: 21 December 1942 (age 82); Hercegszántó, Hungary

Sport
- Sport: Volleyball

Ferenc Tüske (born 21 December 1942) is a Hungarian volleyball player. He competed in the men's tournament at the 1964 Summer Olympics.
