= Sükösd =

- Large village
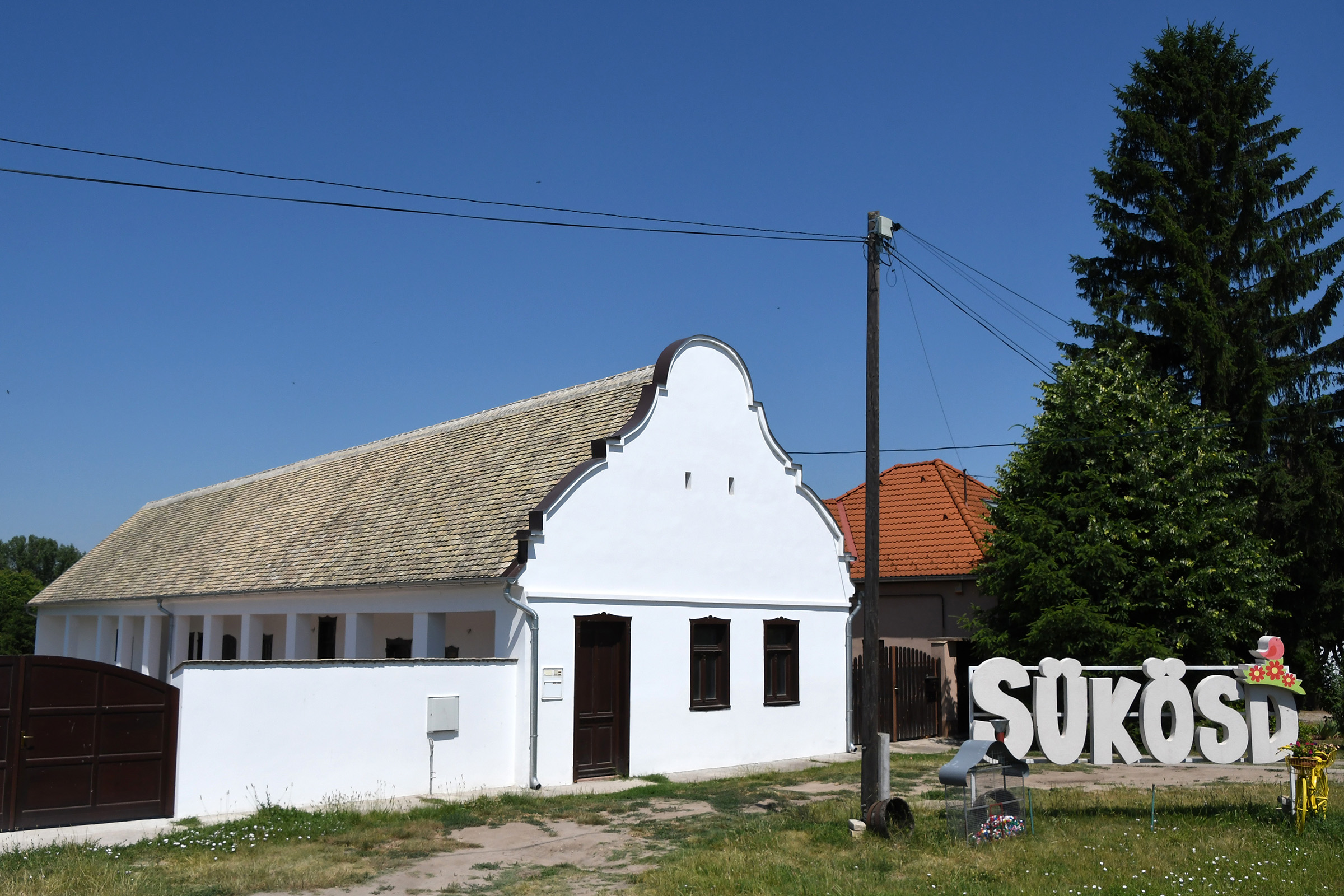
- Traditional house

- Coat of arms

- Location in Hungary
- Coordinates: 46°17′N 19°00′E
- Country: Hungary
- County: Bács-Kiskun
- District: Baja

Area
  - Total: 94.21 km^{2} (36.37 sq mi)

Population (2015)
  - Total: 3,627
  - Density: 38.5/km^{2} (100/sq mi)
- Time zone: UTC+1 (CET)
  - Summer (DST): UTC+2 (CEST)
- Postal code: 6346
- Area code: (+36) 79

Sükösd (Croatian: Čikuzda) is a village in Bács-Kiskun county, in the Southern Great Plain region of southern Hungary.

== History ==
The village was named after the Christian saint, St. Sixtus. In 1521, it was mentioned as Sykesd. Originally, the village was situated much closer to the Danube but, due to the frequent floods, in the early 19th century, the archbishop of Kalocsa resettled its inhabitants on a nearby hill. The new Roman Catholic church was built in 1821. Sükösd had been, for centuries, the property of the archbishops of Kalocsa. However, in the 20th century, Count Mihály Cseszneky de Milvány bought the estate, but his fortune was nationalised in the Communist-ruled People's Republic of Hungary.

== Geography ==
It covers an area of 94.21 km^{2} (36 sq mi) and has a population of 3627 people (2015).
