= Sugovica =

River in Hungary

Coordinates: 46°09′N 18°51′E

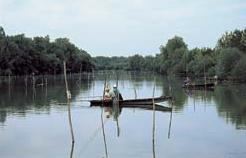

The Sugovica is a small river in southern Hungary, near Baja. It is also known as Kamarás-Duna. The Sugovica is an old tributary of the Danube.

Its name comes from Slavic word "šuga" (scabies), therefore Šugovica should mean "scaby, dirty one", reflecting its color and numerous insects flying above it.
