= Gara, Hungary =

Village in Hungary

Gara
- Flag Coat of arms

- Location of Gara Gara (Hungary) Gara (Europe)
- Coordinates: 46.034°N 19.040°E
- Country: Hungary
- County: Bács-Kiskun
- District: Baja

Area
  - Total: 59.96 km^{2} (23.15 sq mi)

Population (2001)
  - Total: 2,686
  - Density: 44.8/km^{2} (116/sq mi)
- Time zone: UTC+1 (CET)
  - Summer (DST): UTC+2 (CEST)
- Postal code: 6522
- Area code: 79
- Website: https://gara.hu

Gara is a village in Bács-Kiskun county, near Baja, in Hungary.

== History ==
The village is first mentioned in a 1290 document. The name is derived from the Garai family name. The most commonly accepted theory claims that the word Gara originates from a Slavic word meaning "hill". The original village was situated on a small hill, at a distance of 4 kilometers from its current location.

According to Turkish tax listings, the village had 25 houses under Ottoman rule. The original village was destroyed. After the Kingdom of Hungary regained its lost territories, Gara was rebuilt. In 1731, the village's population reached 277. In 1734, Germans settled the place. The first school there was opened in 1755 by János Bary. In 1895, Gara was connected to the national railroad system. This line was closed in 1971 as traffic declined (the Treaty of Trianon had made this line unnecessary, and after fifty years, the train company decided to end service to Gara).

== Demographics ==
Existing ethnicities:

- (Hungary) Magyars
- (Croatia) Croats (from Bunjevci group)
- (Germany) Germans

== Notable persons from Gara ==
- János Dunai (1937–2025), football player
- Antun Karagić, Croatian writer
- Kricskovics Antal, dancer, choreographer
