= Veľká Ida =

Village and municipality in Slovakia

Veľká Ida Nagyida
- Municipality
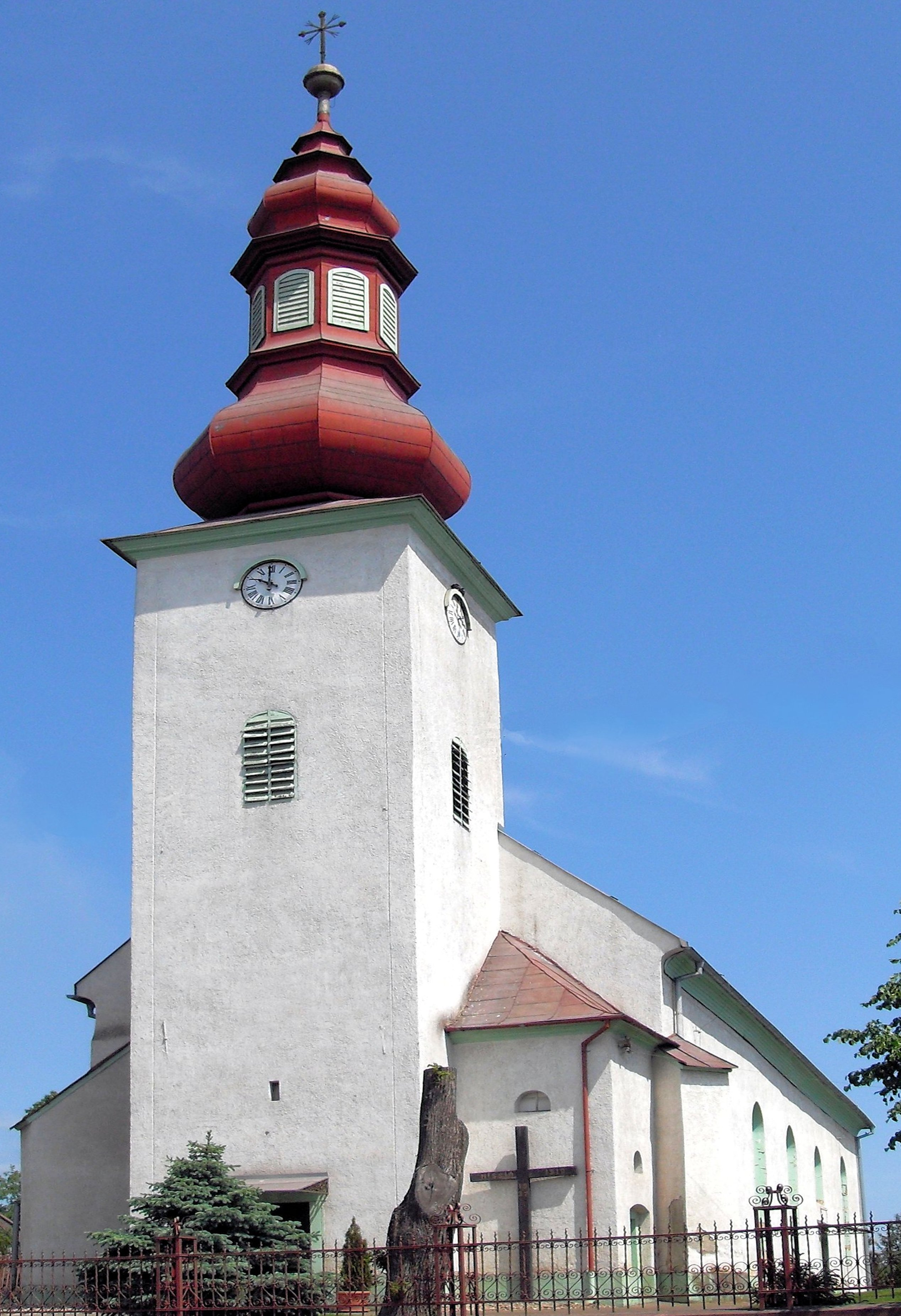

- Location of Veľká Ida in the Košice Region Location of Veľká Ida in Slovakia
- Coordinates: 48.60°N 21.17°E
- Country: Slovakia
- Region: Košice Region
- District: Košice-okolie District
- First mentioned: 1251

Area
  - Total: 31.00 km^{2} (11.97 sq mi)
- Elevation: 210 m (690 ft)

Population (2025)
  - Total: 4,317
- Time zone: UTC+1 (CET)
  - Summer (DST): UTC+2 (CEST)
- Postal code: 445 5
- Area code: +421 55
- Vehicle registration plate (until 2022): KS
- Website: www.velkaida.sk

Veľká Ida (Hungarian: Nagyida) is a village and municipality in Košice-okolie District in the Kosice Region of eastern Slovakia.

== History ==
In historical records the village was first mentioned in 1251, in 1275 it was recorded as Ida.

== Geography ==
The municipality lies at an altitude of 210 metres (690 ft) and covers an area of 31.00 km^{2} (11.97 sq mi) (2025).

The village has its own birth registry and police force.

== Population ==
Population statistic (10 years)
Year	1995	2005	2015	2025
Count	2461	2979	3567	4317
Difference		+21.04%	+19.73%	+21.02%

Population statistic
Year	2024	2025
Count	4232	4317
Difference		+2.00%

It has a population of 4317 people (31 December 2025).

=== Ethnicity ===
Census 2021 (1+ %)
Ethnicity	Number	Fraction
Slovak	2344	59.93%
Romani	1596	40.8%
Hungarian	364	9.3%
Not found out	288	7.36%
Total	3911	

In year 2021 was 3911 people by ethnicity 2344 as Slovak, 1596 as Romani, 364 as Hungarian, 288 as Not found out, 14 as Czech, 8 as Other, 6 as Rusyn, 3 as Ukrainian, 3 as English, 1 as Vietnamese, 1 as Italian, 1 as Silesian, 1 as German and 1 as Canadian.

Note on population: The difference values of population numbers in the table "Population statistic" and in the sections "Ethnicity" & "Religion" is caused by the use of various statistical methods.

A majority of the municipality's population consists of the local Roma community. In 2019, they constituted an estimated 57% of the local population.

=== Religion ===
Census 2021 (1+ %)
Religion	Number	Fraction
Roman Catholic Church	3138	80.24%
None	263	6.72%
Not found out	249	6.37%
Calvinist Church	161	4.12%
Greek Catholic Church	41	1.05%
Total	3911	

In year 2021 was 3911 people by religion 3138 from Roman Catholic Church, 263 from None, 249 from Not found out, 161 from Calvinist Church, 41 from Greek Catholic Church, 26 from Evangelical Church, 8 from Eastern Orthodox Church, 8 from Christian Congregations in Slovakia, 6 from Ad hoc movements, 4 from Jehovah's Witnesses, 2 from Other, 2 from United Methodist Church, 1 from Islam, 1 from Church of Jesus Christ of Latter-day Saints and 1 from Apostolic Church.
