= Hercegszántó =

Village in Bács-Kiskun, Hungary

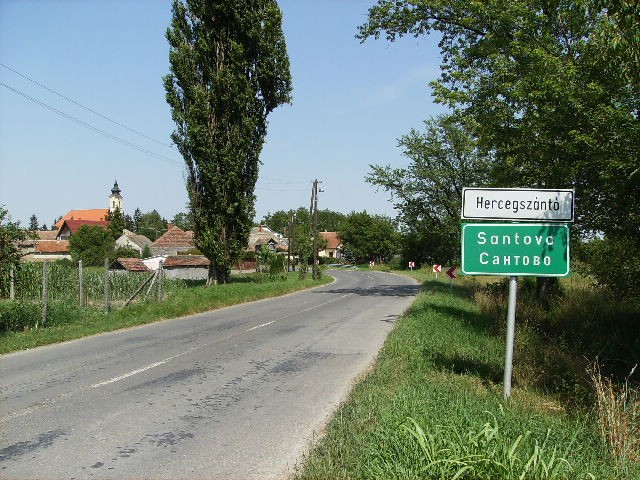
- Hungarian-Croatian-Serbian city limit sign

- Flag Coat of arms

- Location of Hercegszántó Hercegszántó (Hungary) Hercegszántó (Europe)
- Coordinates: 45°56′49.2″N 18°56′13.2″E
- Country: Hungary
- County: Bács-Kiskun
- District: Baja

Area
  - Total: 68.55 km^{2} (26.47 sq mi)

Population (2001)
  - Total: 2,329
  - Density: 34/km^{2} (88/sq mi)
- Time zone: UTC+1 (CET)
  - Summer (DST): UTC+2 (CEST)
- Postal code: 6525
- Area code: 79

Hercegszántó (Croatian: Santovo, Serbian: Сантово) is a village in Bács-Kiskun County in Hungary, famous for being the birthplace of footballer Flórián Albert. Residents are Magyars, with minority of Serbs and Croats. Until the end of World War II, the Danube Swabians lived in this village, it was the only village of Stifulder, in the Bács-Kiskun county. The Stifulder are a Roman Catholic subgroup of the Danube Swabians whose ancestors arrived in the 17th and 18th centuries from the Fulda District. Majority of the Danube Swabians was expelled to Allied-occupied Germany and Allied-occupied Austria in 1945–1948, as a result of the Potsdam Agreement.

A border crossing into Serbia is located near Hercegszántó. The Serbian town of Bački Breg lies across the border. It is also only a few kilometres away from Croatia.

== Notable people ==
- Flórián Albert, footballer, born in Hercegszántó in 1941
- István Blazsetin (1941–2001), Croatian poet and writer, born in Hercegszántó in 1941
- István Gyurity, film and stage actor, born in Hercegszántó in 1970
- Gusztáv Kondor astronomer, mathematician, and geodesist, born in Hercegszántó in 1825
- Paul Mandy, economist, born in Hercegszántó in 1927
- Ferenc Tüske, olympic volleyball player, born in Hercegszántó in 1942
- Zsigmond Villányi, olympic pentathlete, born in Hercegszántó in 1950
