= Bácsszentgyörgy =

- Location of Bácsszentgyörgy, Hungary
- Coordinates: 46.033°N 18.950°E
- Country: Hungary
- County: Bács-Kiskun

Area
  - Total: 14.73 km^{2} (5.69 sq mi)

Population (2005)
  - Total: 207
  - Density: 14.05/km^{2} (36.4/sq mi)
- Time zone: UTC+1 (CET)
  - Summer (DST): UTC+2 (CEST)
- Postal code: 6551
- Area code: 79

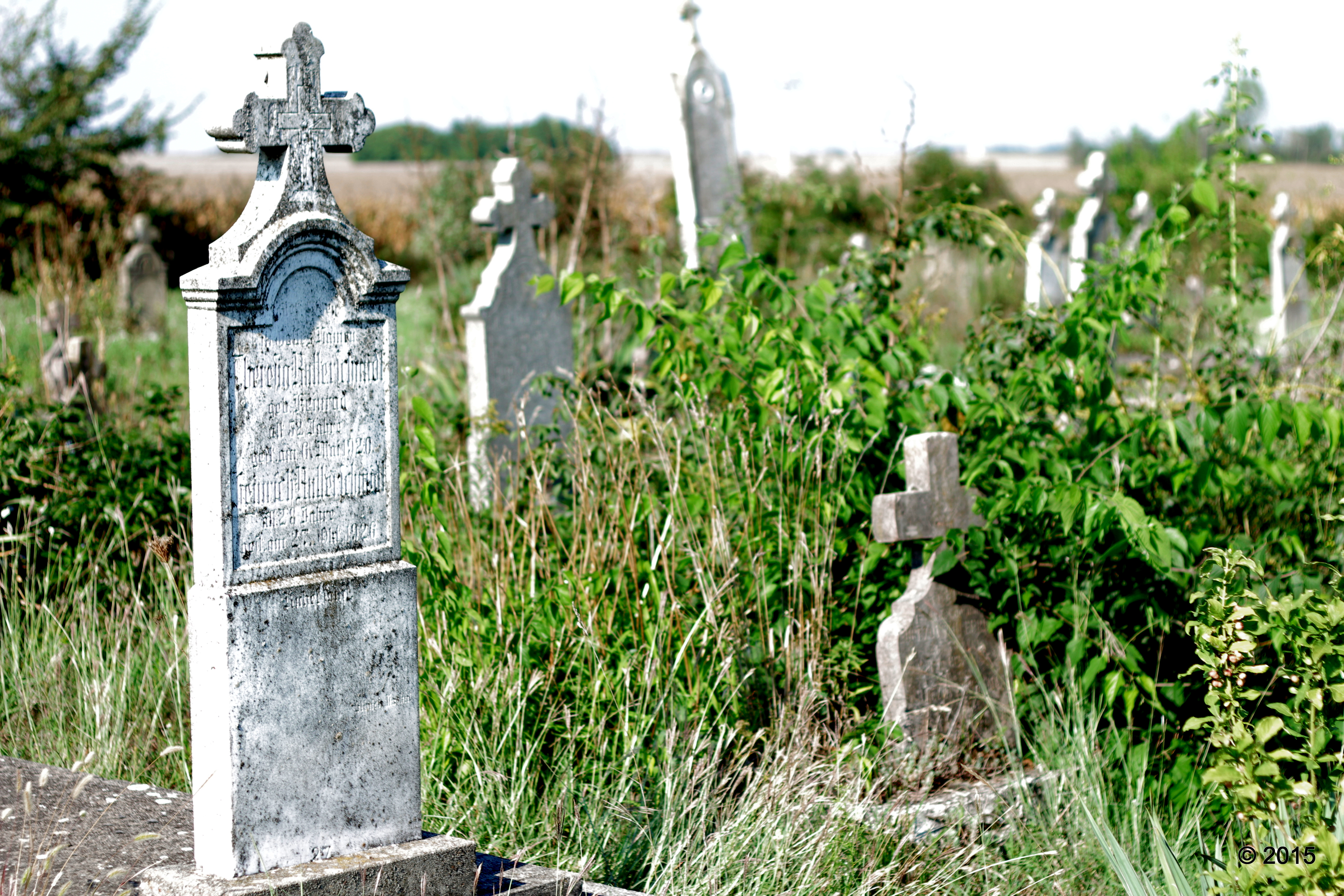
Bácsszentgyörgy's old cemetery

Bácsszentgyörgy (Serbo-Croatian Latin: Đurić) is a border village in Bács-Kiskun county, in the Southern Great Plain region of southern Hungary, towards Serbia.

== Geography ==
It covers an area of 14.73 km^{2} (6 sq mi) and has a population of 207 people (2005).
