= Csávoly =

Csávoly _{Tschawal}
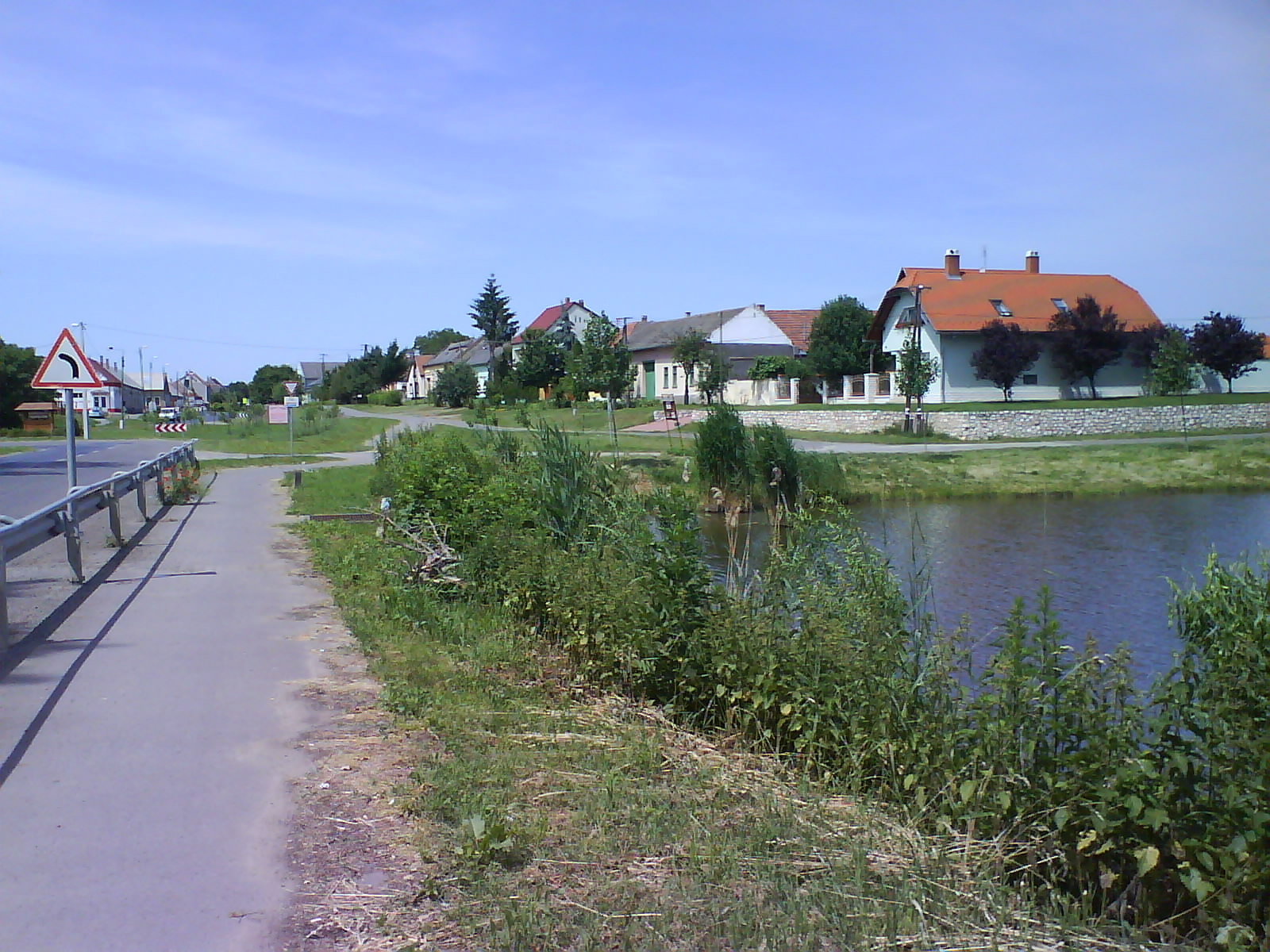
- Pond in Csávoly

- Location of Csávoly
- Coordinates: 46.191°N 19.147°E
- Country: Hungary
- County: Bács-Kiskun

Area
  - Total: 47.43 km^{2} (18.31 sq mi)

Population (2001)
  - Total: 2,104
  - Density: 44.3/km^{2} (115/sq mi)
- Time zone: UTC+1 (CET)
  - Summer (DST): UTC+2 (CEST)
- Postal code: 6448
- Area code: 79
- Website: -

Csávoly (German: Tschawal, Croatian: Čavolj, Serbian Cyrillic: Чавољ) is a village in Bács-Kiskun county, Hungary. It is about 15 km (9 mi) far away from Baja.

== History ==
Csávoly's history can be traced back to 1198. The village - under the name of Chayol-Thayal - had many proprietors since 1374. According to Turkish tax listings, Csávoly had 22 houses in 1580. After this time, the village was destroyed and founded again several times. The town was reborn in 1734. The first church was constructed in 1740. Between 1782 and 1784, on the suggestion of the bishop of Kalocsa, 424 Germans settled the village from Soroksár and Hajós.

1947 was a major turning point in the village's history. According to the Potsdam Decree, 553 Germans were replaced with Hungarians from Slovakia (the Germans were deported to Germany).

== Demographics ==
Csávoly still remains a multiethnic village (with a Hungarian majority). Existing minorities include:

- (Germany) German
- (Croatia) Croats (from Bunjevci group)

Csávoly has 2,104 residents.

== Buildings and structures ==
- 165 metres tall guyed mast used for FM-/TV-broadcasting
