= Nemesnádudvar =

Nemesnádudvar Nadwar
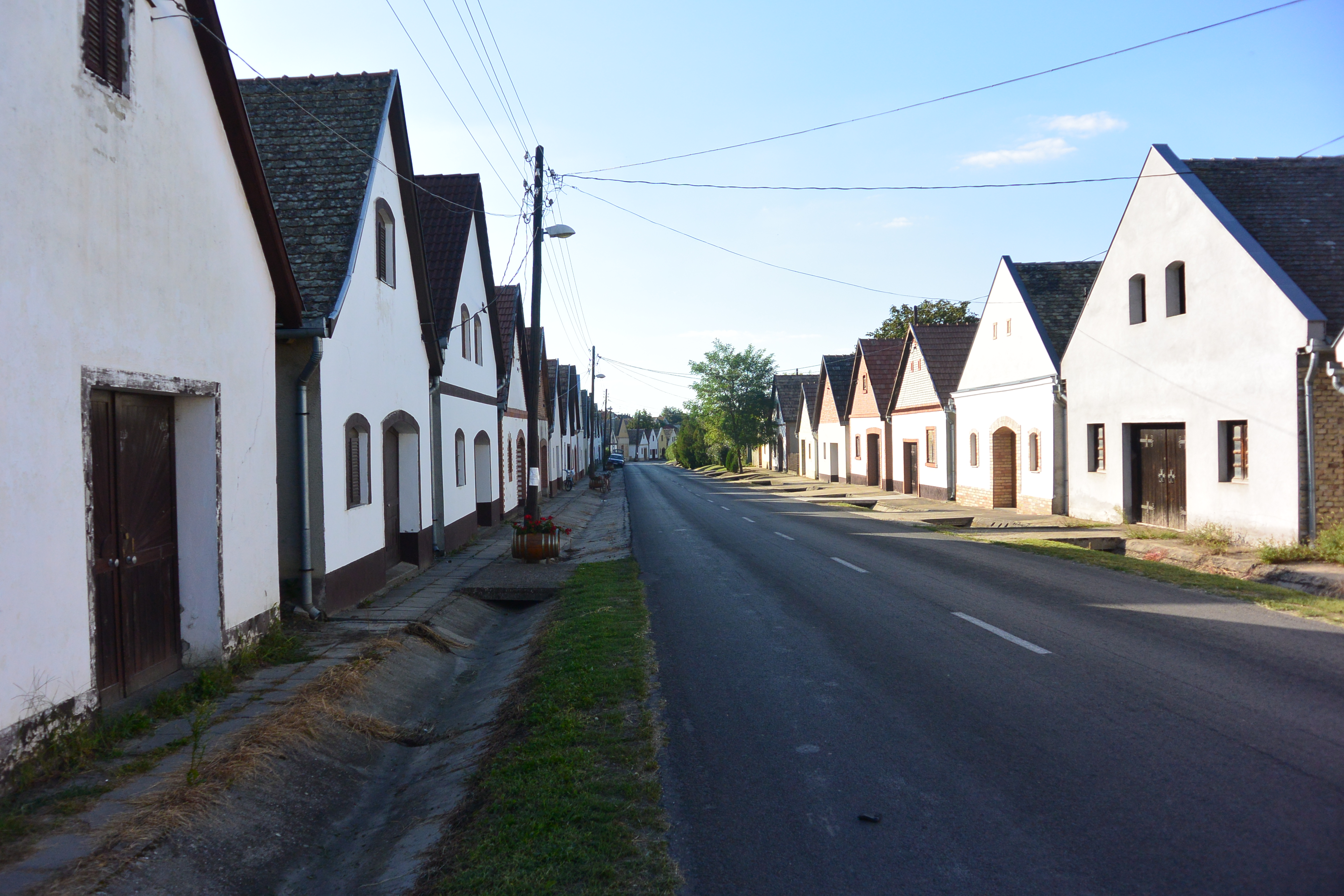
- Houses in the village

- Flag Coat of arms

- Location within Hungary
- Coordinates: 46°20′N 19°03′E
- Country: Hungary
- County: Bács-Kiskun

Area
  - Total: 58.79 km^{2} (22.70 sq mi)

Population (2001)
  - Total: 2,064
  - Density: 35.11/km^{2} (90.93/sq mi)
- Time zone: UTC+1 (CET)
  - Summer (DST): UTC+2 (CEST)
- Postal code: 6345
- Area code: 79
- Website: https://www.nemesnadudvar.hu/

Nemesnádudvar (German: Nadwar, Croatian: Dudvar or Nadvar) is a village in Bács-Kiskun county, Hungary.

The parish of Nádudvar was founded in 1739, separating from parish Hajós. Until 1724, there were Croats living in this parish, when archbishop Csáky settles Germans in this village, so that in 1834, in the parish of Nádudvar, only German language was used.
Village was changing its name several times, Nád-Udvar, Nádudvar, and finally, since 1901, has the name Nemesnádudvar.

== Personalities ==
- Grgur Cserháti, priest and author of prayerbook
- Ferenc Szép, priest, the great Magyar cultural worker
