= Érsekcsanád =

Village in Bács-Kiskun, Hungary

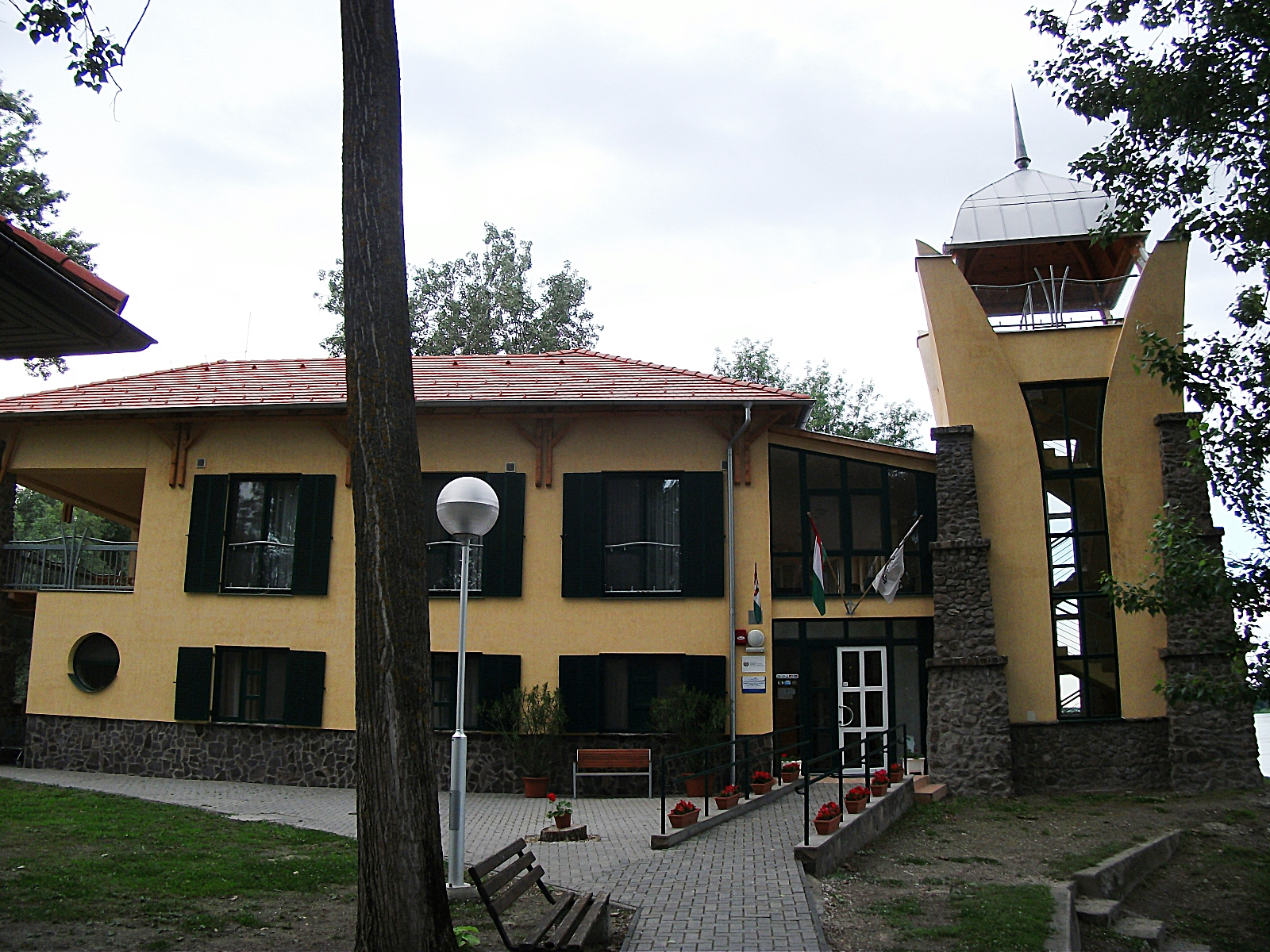
- Town hall

- Flag Coat of arms

- Location of Érsekhalma Érsekcsanád (Hungary) Érsekcsanád (Europe)
- Coordinates: 46°15′N 18°59′E
- Country: Hungary
- County: Bács-Kiskun
- District: Baja

Area
  - Total: 58.62 km^{2} (22.63 sq mi)

Population (2015)
  - Total: 2,804
  - Density: 48.1/km^{2} (125/sq mi)
- Time zone: UTC+1 (CET)
  - Summer (DST): UTC+2 (CEST)
- Postal code: 6347
- Area code: 79

Érsekcsanád (Croatian: Čanad or Čenad) is a village in Bács-Kiskun county, in the Southern Great Plain region of southern Hungary. It is named after Csanád, the first head (comes) of the former Csanád County of Hungary in the first decades of the 11th century.

== Geography ==
It covers an area of 58.62 km^{2} (23 sq mi) and had a population of 2804 people as of 2015.
