= Dunafalva =

Village in Bács-Kiskun, Hungary

Dunafalva Donaudorf
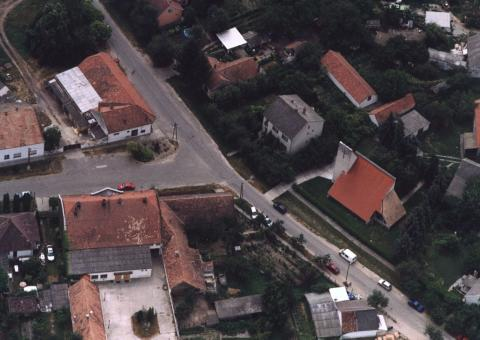

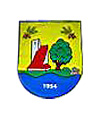
- Coat of arms

- Location of Dunafalva
- Coordinates: 46.0833°N 18.7833°E
- Country: Hungary
- County: Bács-Kiskun
- District: Baja

Area
  - Total: 57.89 km^{2} (22.35 sq mi)

Population (2015)
  - Total: 905
  - Density: 15.6/km^{2} (40/sq mi)
- Time zone: UTC+1 (CET)
  - Summer (DST): UTC+2 (CEST)
- Postal code: 6513
- Area code: (+36) 69

Dunafalva (German: Donaudorf; Croatian: Topolovac; Latin: Contra Florentiam) is a village in Bács-Kiskun county, in the Southern Great Plain region of southern Hungary.

== History ==
The village was established in 1954 from the outer parts of Dunaszekcső lying on the left bank of the Danube.

== Geography ==
It covers an area of 57.89 km^{2} (22 sq mi) and had a population of 905 people as of 2015.

== Demographics ==
- (Hungary) Magyars
- (Croatia) Croats
