= Felsőszentiván =

- Location of Felsőszentiván
- Coordinates: 46.1950°N 19.1903°E
- Country: Hungary
- County: Bács-Kiskun

Area
  - Total: 53.54 km^{2} (20.67 sq mi)

Population (2015)
  - Total: 1,815
  - Density: 38.25/km^{2} (99.1/sq mi)
- Time zone: UTC+1 (CET)
  - Summer (DST): UTC+2 (CEST)
- Postal code: 6447
- Area code: 79

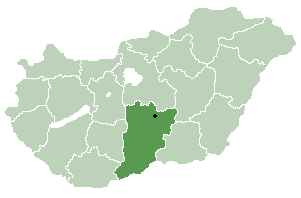
Location of Bács-Kiskun county in Hungary

Felsőszentiván (Croatian: Gornji Sveti Ivan and Gornji Sentivan) is a village and municipality in Bács-Kiskun county, in the Southern Great Plain region of southern Hungary.

== Geography ==
It covers an area of 53.54 km^{2} (21 sq mi) and has a population of 2015 people (2015).

== Demographics ==
Existing ethnicities:

- (Hungary) Magyars
- (Croatia) Croats

== Notable persons ==
- Petar Pekić, Croatian writer and historian
