= Dávod =

Village in Hungary

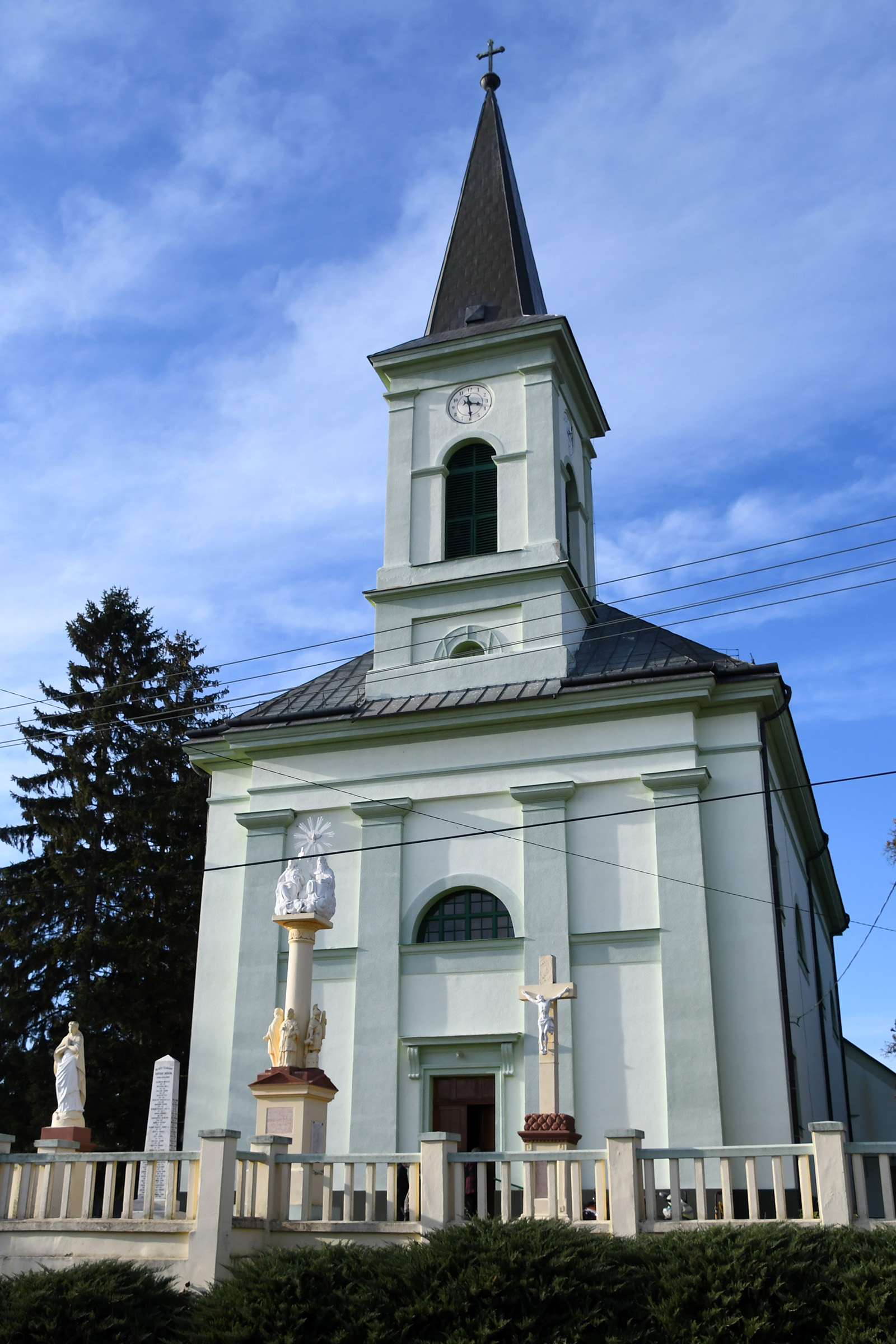

- Flag Coat of arms

- Location of Dávod Dávod (Hungary) Dávod (Europe)
- Coordinates: 46°00′N 18°55′E
- Country: Hungary
- County: Bács-Kiskun
- District: Baja

Area
  - Total: 69.21 km^{2} (26.72 sq mi)

Population (2013)
  - Total: 2,003
  - Density: 28.9/km^{2} (75/sq mi)
- Time zone: UTC+1 (CET)
  - Summer (DST): UTC+2 (CEST)
- Postal code: 6524
- Area code: 79

Dávod (Croatian: Dautovo) is a village in Bács-Kiskun county, in the Southern Great Plain region of Hungary.

== Geography ==
It covers an area of 69.21 km^{2} (27 sq mi) and had an estimated population of 2003 people in 2013.

== Population ==
Year	1980	1990	2001	2010	2011	2013
Population	2,934 (census)	2,612 (census)	2,244 (census)	1,994 (estimate)	1,963 (census)	2,003 (estimate)
