= Szeremle =

- Location of Dunafalva
- Coordinates: 46.1500°N 18.8833°E
- Country: Hungary
- County: Bács-Kiskun

Area
  - Total: 34.64 km^{2} (13.37 sq mi)

Population (2015)
  - Total: 1,414
  - Density: 41.5/km^{2} (107/sq mi)
- Time zone: UTC+1 (CET)
  - Summer (DST): UTC+2 (CEST)
- Postal code: 6512
- Area code: 79

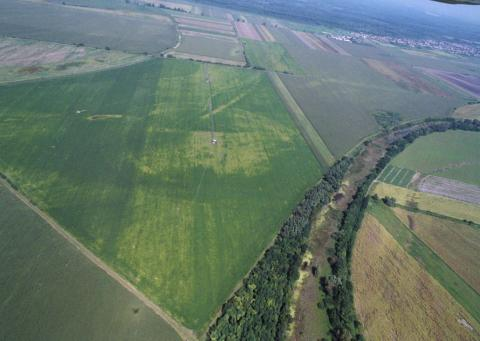
Aerial photography of Szeremle

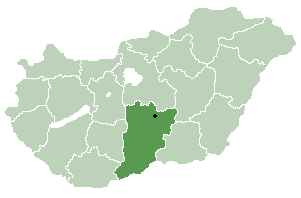
Location of Bács-Kiskun county in Hungary

Szeremle (Croatian: Srimljan) is a village in Bács-Kiskun county, in the Southern Great Plain region of southern Hungary.

== Geography ==
It covers an area of 34.64 km^{2} (13 sq mi) and has a population of 1414 people (2015).

== Demographics ==
- (Hungary) Magyars
- (Croatia) Croats
