= Vaskút =

Vaskút _{Waschkut/Eisenbrunn}
- Location of Vaskút
- Coordinates: 46.1167°N 18.9833°E
- Country: Hungary
- County: Bács-Kiskun

Area
  - Total: 71.49 km^{2} (27.60 sq mi)

Population (2015)
  - Total: 3,327
  - Density: 46.5/km^{2} (120/sq mi)
- Time zone: UTC+1 (CET)
  - Summer (DST): UTC+2 (CEST)
- Postal code: 6521
- Area code: 79

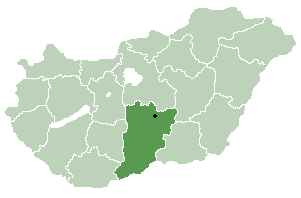
Location of Bács-Kiskun county in Hungary

Vaskút (German: Waschkut or Eisenbrunn, Croatian: Baškut or Vaškut) is a large village in Bács-Kiskun county, in the Southern Great Plain region of southern Hungary.

== Geography ==
It covers an area of 71.49 km^{2}. It has a population of 3327 people (2015).

== Demographics ==
- (Hungary) Magyars
- (Germany) Germans
- (Croatia) Croats
- (Serbia) Bunjevci

Before 1945, there was high share of Germans (Danube Swabians) in Vaskút's population, that spoke their own dialect of German language.
After the war, numerous Magyars (Szeklers from Bukovina and Csángós from Moldavia) were settled here.

== Notable persons ==
- Fabijan Peštalić (1845–1909), Franciscan, important personality of national movement of the Danubian Croats
- Grgur Peštalić (1755–1809), Franciscan, Croatian writer
- Bede Lackner (1927–2020), Catholic priest and monk
