= Bátmonostor =

Bátmonosto

- Location of Bátmonostor
- Coordinates: 46.100°N 18.933°E
- Country: Hungary
- County: Bács-Kiskun

Area
  - Total: 37.95 km^{2} (14.65 sq mi)

Population (2015)
  - Total: 1,503
  - Density: 39.6/km^{2} (103/sq mi)
- Time zone: UTC+1 (CET)
  - Summer (DST): UTC+2 (CEST)
- Postal code: 6528
- Area code: 79

Bátmonostor (Croatian: Monoštorlija) is a village in Bács-Kiskun county, in the Southern Great Plain region of southern Hungary.

== Geography ==
It covers an area of 104.94 km^{2} (41 sq mi) and has a population of 1503 people (2015).

== Demography ==
Residents are Magyars. There is a small community of Croats in the village.

== Twin Towns ==
- Königseggwald, Germany
