= List of German exonyms for places in Serbia =

Below is a list of German language exonyms for towns and villages in Serbia. This list excludes names where only the spelling changes.

== List of names ==
Serbian place	German name
Ada	Ada (an der Theiß)
Alibunar	Alisbrunn
Apatin	Abthausen
Bačka Palanka	Deutsch Palanka
Bački Breg	Bereg
Bački Brestovac	Ulmenau
Bački Gračac	Filipsdorf
Bački Gračac	Filipowa
Bački Jarak	Jarek
Bački Jarak	Jarmosch
Bački Petrovac	Petrovacz
Bačko Dobro Polje	Klein Ker
Bačko Novo Selo	Neudorf an der Donau
Bajmok	Nagelsdorf
Banatska Topola	Banater Topola
Banatski Dušanovac	Roggendorf
Banatski Dvor	Banater Hof
Banatski Dvor	Rogendorf
Banatski Karlovac	Karlsdorf
Banatsko Novo Selo	Banater Neudorf
Banatsko Veliko Selo	Charleville
Banatsko Veliko Selo	Sankt Hubert
Banatsko Veliko Selo	Seultour
Bečej	Alt Betsche
Bela Crkva	Weißkirchen
Belo Blato	Elisenheim
Budisava	Neudorf
Budisava	Waldneudorf
Bukovac	Bukowitz
Čelarevo	Tscheb
Čestereg	Neu Hatzfeld
Čonoplja	Tschonopel
Crvena Crkva	Rothkirchen
Crvenka	Rotweil
Crvenka	Tscherwenka
Deč	Detschau
Deronje	Dornau
Doroslovo	Doroslo
Dužine	Setschanfeld
Ečka	Deutsch-Etschka
Ečka	Romanish-Etscka
Elemir	Elemer
Feketić	Feketitsch
Filipovo	Filipowa
Futog	Futok
Gajdobra	Schönau
Gakovo	Graumarkt
Gakovo	Gakowa
Glogonj	Glogon
Grgurevci	Gregurevtzi
Gudurica	Kudritz
Hajdučica	Heideschüte
Hetin	Tomsdorf
Hrtkovci	Hrtkovtzi
Inđija	India
Irig	Irick
Ivanovo	Alexanderkirchen
Jaša Tomić	Modosch
Kačarevo	Franzfeld
Kanjiža	Alt-Kanischa
Karvukovo	Karbok
Karvukovo	Karawukowa
Karvukovo	Wolfingen
Katarina	Katharienfeld
Kikinda	Groß Kikinda
Kljajićevo	Kernei
Knićanin	Ruldofgnad
Kolut	Kolluth
Kovin	Kubin
Krajišnik	Stefansfeld
Kraljevićevo	Franzfeld
Krčedin	Kertschdein
Kruščić	Weprowatz
Kruševlje	Kruschiewel
Kula	Josephsfeld
Lazarevo	Lazarfeld
Lovćenac	Sekitsch
Lukićevo	Sigmundfeld
Mali Iđoš	Hejdesch
Martinica	Sigmundsdorf
Maglić	Bulkes
Međa	Pardan
Mladenovo	Bukin
Molin	Molidorf
Nakovo	Nakodorf
Ninčićevo	Pardan
Nova Crnja	Deutsch Zerne
Nova Gajdobra	Wekerledorf
Nova Pazova	Neu-Pasua
Novi Běcej	Neu-Betsche
Novi Kneževac	Neu-Kanischa
Novi Kozarci	Heufeld
Novi Kozarci	Mastort
Novi Sad	Neusatz
Obrež	Obresch
Obrovac	Oberndorf
Odžaci	Hodschag
Omoljica	Homolitz
Opovo	Königsdorf
Orešac	Deutsch Oreschatz
Pančevo	Pantschowa
Pašićevo	Alt Ker
Petrovaradin	Peterwardein
Pivnice	Bibenitz
Plandište	Zichydorf
Plavna	Plawingen
Pločica	Ploschitz
Prigrevica	Sankt Johann an der Schanze
Prigrevica	Priglewitz
Rastina	Deutsch Baja
Ratkovo	Parabutsch
Ravni Topolovac	Kathreinfeld
Ravno Selo	Schowe
Riđica	Legin
Riđica	Riedau
Riđica	Rigitza
Šajkaš	Schajkasch-Sentiwan
Sarča	Deutsch-Sartscha
Savino Selo	Torschau
Sečanj	Setschan
Sečenovo	Sechenfeld
Senta	Zenta
Soltur	Seiltour
Sombor	Zombor
Sonta	Waldau
Srbobran	Sankt Thomas
Srbobran	Thomasberg
Srpska Crnja	Deutsch-Zerne
Srpska Crnja	Serbisch-Zerne
Sprski Miletić	Berauersheim
Sprski Miletić	Militisch
Sremska Mitrovica	Mitrowitz
Sremksi Karlovci	Karlowitz
Stanišić	Donauwachenheim
Stanischitsch
Straža	Lagerdorf
Subotica	Maria-Theresiopel
Šupljaja	Stefansfeld
Sutjeska	Deutsch-Sartscha
Sutjeska	Neu-Sartscha
Temerin	Temeri
Torža	Torschau
Tovariševo	Towarisch
Velika Greda	Georgshausen
Veliki Gaj	Groß Gaj
Veliko Selo	Charleville
Veliko Selo	St. Huber
Veliko Središte	Groß-Sredischte
Vojlovica	Marienfeld
Vrbas	Werbas
Vršac	Werschetz
Vujićevo	Torda
Žabalj	Josefsdorf
Žitište	Sankt Georgen an der Bega
Zmajevo	Alt Keer, Altker
Zrenjanin	Groß Betschkerek

== See also ==
- German exonyms
- List of European exonyms
- List of cities, towns and villages in Vojvodina
