= Stanišić (village) =

Stanišić Станишић (Serbian) Őrszállás (Hungarian)
- Village (Selo)
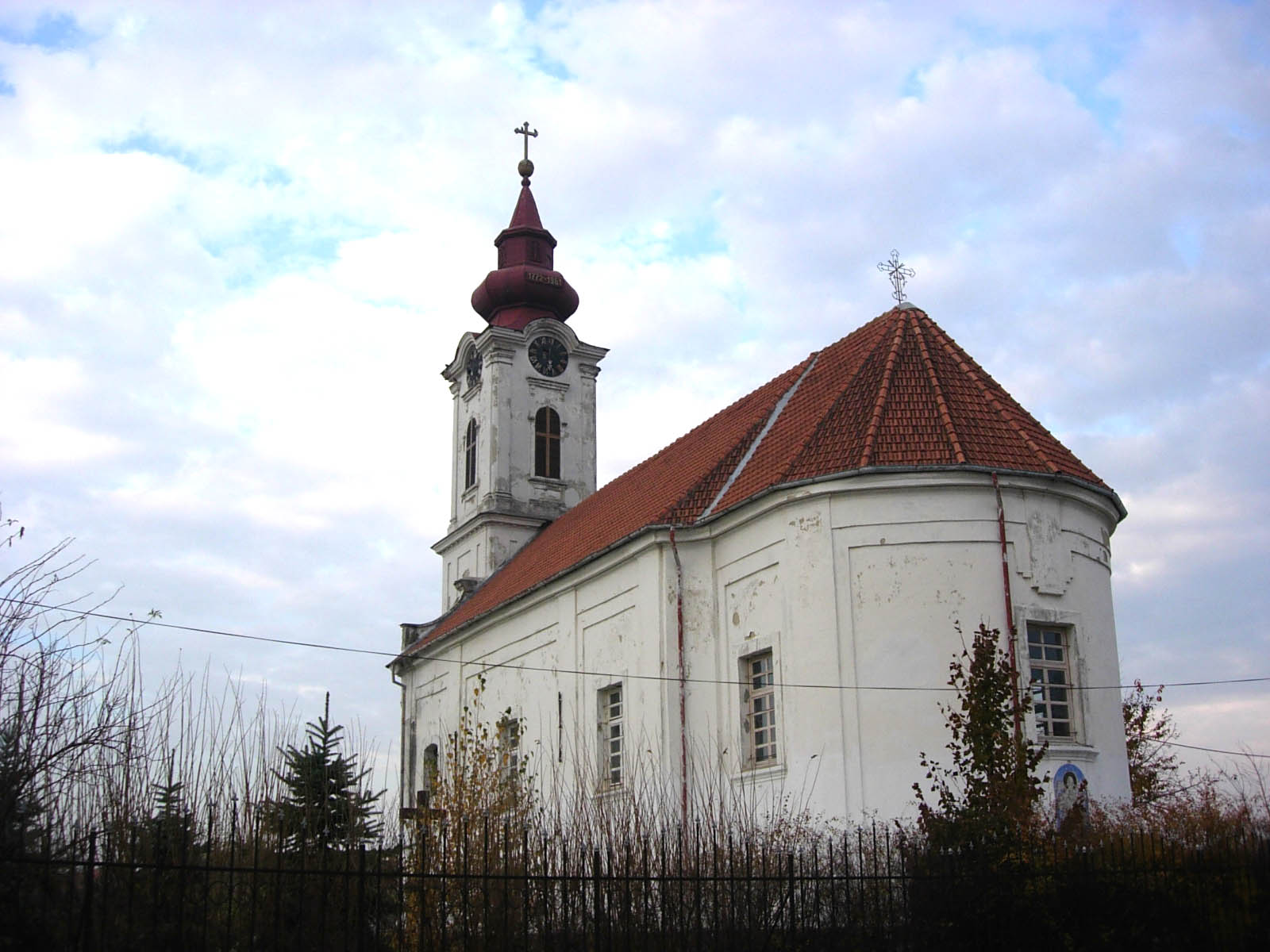
- The Orthodox church

- Location within Vojvodina Location within Serbia Location within Europe
- Coordinates: 45°56′N 19°10′E
- Country: Serbia
- Province: Vojvodina
- Region: Bačka
- District: West Bačka
- Municipality: Sombor

Population (2011)
  - Total: 3,971
- Time zone: UTC+1 (CET)
  - Summer (DST): UTC+2 (CEST)

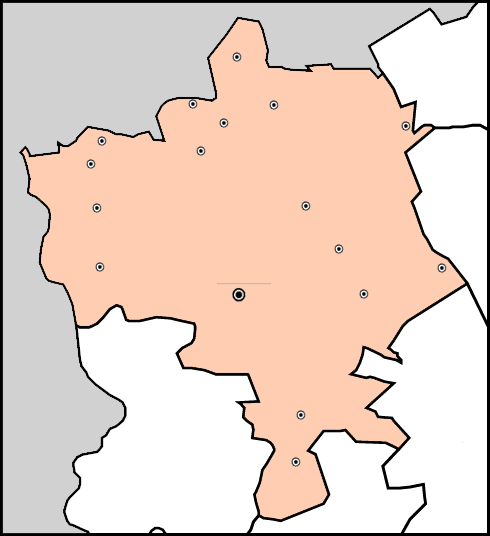

Stanišić (Serbian Cyrillic: Станишић) is a village in Serbia. It is situated in the Sombor municipality, in the West Bačka District, Vojvodina province. The village has a Serb ethnic majority and its population numbering 3.971 people (2011 census).

== Name ==
In Serbian, the village is known as Stanišić or Станишић, in German as Stanischitsch, Stanischitz, Tannenschütz, Tannischitz, Tanaschitz or Donauwachenheim, in Croatian as Stanišić, in Hungarian as Őrszállás, and in Bunjevac as Stanišić.

== Geography ==
The village of Stanišić is located in the Northwestern part of Serbia in the municipality of Sombor, about 7 miles from the Hungarian border between Riđica, Gakovo, Svetozar Miletić and Aleksa Šantić. It is located just on the edge of the great land-plateau called Telečka (Telečka lesna zaravan) about 91 meters above the sea level. Some minor parts of the village are about 1 meter lower being in the terrain beside the land-plateau.

In the times prior to the 18th and 19th centuries the whole area beside the plateau (towards Kruševlje and Gakovo) was in fens, morasses and swampy meadows, especially in the raining seasons, and thus inconvenient for settling. Stanišić was founded just at the edge of these two landmarks. The lower ground was populated by Serbs in 1763 and the upper by Germans in 1786 and by 1811 both villages were united in one. The surrounding area is a great Pannonian Plate without any hills, woods or rivers. In later periods small, tiny channels and drainages were built beside the village just to take off all the waters from the yards, meadows and gardens in the lower parts of the village.

== History ==
=== Early period prior to 1763 ===
The earliest recorded settlement on this location was called Örs in Hungarian, and it was mentioned in 1339. Another place, written down as Bathteremlye appears in 1342, and another one named Paris and Paris falu meaning the village of Parish appears in 1366. In 1412, a place named again as Bathteremlye was mentioned as an estate of János Maróti. Actually, there is no historical evidence that these places were in fact the same place, but they are at least proof that this area was inhabited even in the Middle Ages, if not even earlier. There is also some confusion about the exact location of these settlements because the old charts are not precise. But, it is possible that their location was about half a mile or so to the south.

There is also no evidence of any inhabitants in this area. They could have been Hungarians or Serbs, as this area was a part of the multiethnic Kingdom of Hungary from the early 11th Century until 1526, when the Turks conquered it and expelled most of its former population to the north. Parish was not recorded in 1520, but it was mentioned in 1554, 1570 and again in 1578 having 17 Turkish and 9 Serb families. It was registered in 1712 for the last time.

In 1658 this area was written down as puszta, meaning in Hungarian only a wasted, deserted land and belonging to Baron Pál Serényi. As the Turks were defeated and banished from these parts of Pannonian plain in 1687, the new Austrian authorities populated this area with Serbs, Croats (Bunjevci) and Hungarians, but there is again no evidence that Stanišić was settled down. The name of Stanišić (Stanicic) was recorded in 1635 and it was a depopulated place, since in 1598 all Serb population from that area emigrated to Esztergom in Hungary. It is recorded again in 1717 and 1720, but again as puszta. It is possible, that some Serb soldiers of the military border have been living in or near Stanišić between 1720 and 1746. As the military border was abolished in 1746, they moved away and in 1746 Stanišić was called puszta again.

The nearest town was Sombor, about 11 miles to the south, developing as a county center. Some old settlements were repopulated with Serbs, Hungarians and Croats (Bunjevci) after 1690 and in the early 18th century close to today's Stanišić position, such as Sombor, Riđica, Bački Breg, Monoštor, Šari (near Aleksa Šantić), Gara, Dávod, Nagybaracska, Hercegszántó, Katymár, Csátalja, Csávoly, Bácsbokod (Bikity), Bácsborsód, Bácsalmás, Tavankut, Bajmok, Đurić, Đurđin, Rančevo, etc. Other places, which are nearer to Stanišić, were settled later by German colonists, such as Kolut in 1757, Gakovo in 1763–67, Kruševlje in 1765–67 and Svetozar Miletić in 1748–52 by Hungarians and Croats (Bunjevci). Again in 1746 the whole area surrounding today's Stanišić was called puszta and a part of the Trench of Sombor (Somborski šanac) serving just for cattle-pasture. Baron Gyula Redl, who got the pusta Stanišić to its estate, populated it with some 152 Hungarian and Slovak families from the neighbouring villages in 1752.

=== Period of intensive settling 1763–1830 ===
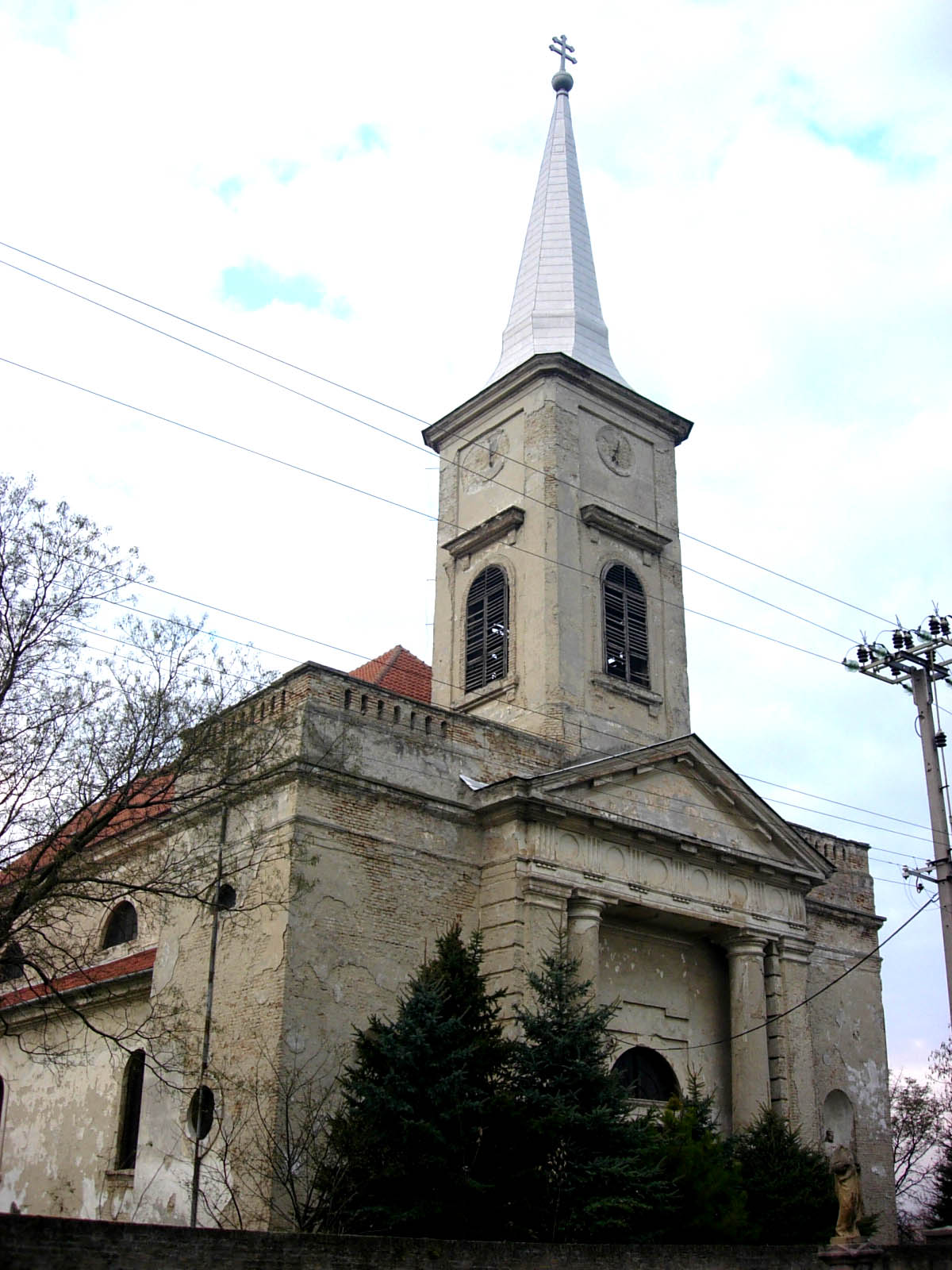
The Name of Blessed Virgin Mary Catholic Church

There are reports that some Hungarian and Bunjevac families from Svetozar Miletić have settled down in Stanišić in 1752 and again in 1754, but most of them remained there only temporarily. As early as 1749, some Serb families might have been there as well, as they had just been turned out of the village of Bukin, which German colonists had ordered to be settled down.

Certainly, the greatest group of Serbs came beginning with the year of 1763 and continued to settle there for the next two decades. That year of 1763 is considered as the founding year. The immigrating population was of Serb origin, coming from the neighbouring villages of Dávod (Dautovo) and Nagybaracska (Baračka) (some 15 miles to the Northwest, now in Hungary), where they have been settled down as refugees from Serbia in the 1690s. As the great German colonisation of these parts of the Habsburg Empire began in 1763, most of Slavic population was ordered to be resettled to the areas called puszta, releasing so places for German and Hungarian settlers, who came in state-colonization. Anton von Cothmann, the Director of the Imperial Estates in this area and the Chief-Commissioner for colonization visited this land in 1763 and ordered Puszta Krusivle (Kruševlje), Priglewitz (Prigrevica), Kernei (Krnjaja / Kljajićevo) and Puszta Gakowa (Gakovo) to be settled down by Germans. The village of Kolut was already populated in 1757, and Apatin in 1749. The villages of Dávod and Nagybaracska were populated by Hungarians. The Serb population was forced to move in Bački Brestovac, Stapar, Sivac, Deronje, Parabuć (now Ratkovo), Riđica and Stanišić. So, in 1763 Stanišić was founded by Serb families from Nagybaracska and Dávod. The following year, 1764, another groups of Serbs from Prigrevica and Bokčenović came in, as well as in 1766 from Karavukovo. Some Serbian families came also in the coming years from the nearby villages of Hercegszántó (Santovo), Đurić, Gara, etc. Anton von Cothman visited the village in 1763 and in 1764 supervising German colonisation of Gakovo and Kruševlje. He was the first person who ever recorded the village name Stanišić being there. He drew a map of the village, showing in 1764 about 50 small houses, located just beside the great road from Baja to Petrovaradin, two great fens beside them and at the end wrote the name Sztanesity below it. As he could not speak the Serbian language, he spelled it therefore wrongly. The inhabitants called their new settlement Stanišić (pronounced Stani:shity).

According to lore, the name originated when the settlers were a long way into unknown area, walking on foot, thirsty, hungry and tired of truck-hauling, and pleading their leader to stop for a while just to take some rest. They shouted Halt, old man! (in Serbian Latin: "Stani, čiča!"), This place is good enough for us!. He had done so, but not earlier than they had arrived on suitable land. So, from the words Stani čiča they called their new home firstly Staničič (pronounced Stani:chich), which soon became more easily for pronunciation like Stanišić. This story might have happened even earlier, because this village name was recorded firstly in 1654. Officially, it was also recorded under this name in 1832 (Hungarian: Sztanisity). Its villagers always called it so. The Hungarian authorities changed it officially to Őrszállás in 1904. As a part of Yugoslavia and Serbia from 1918, the original name was never changed, except during the Hungarian occupation in the World War II (1941–44). However, the Germans who settled here in 1786 and later, pronounced it Stanischitsch or Stanischitz (or just more common as Tannischitz), as a more suitable form for them. Attempts of Pro-Nazi orientated Germans to change the village name around 1935–36 (as a future part of germanisation of the area) to Donau-Wachenheim, Deutsch-Wachenheim, Steinsitz, Tannenschütz were only bad mistranslations of its original name, and never commonly accepted, not even amongst themselves. Stanišić (German: Stanischitsch) was and remained Stanišić.

In those early years the communion of Stanišić numbered about 50 families. In 1772, a Serbian Orthodox church was built in the middle of the village, it still exists on the same spot. In 1768, 88 families were recorded, all farmers and cattle-breeders. A few German families moved to Stanišić about 1770 from Gakovo and Kruševlje. Some years later, in 1782, the first Catholic parish was founded, gathering only a few Hungarian, German and Slovak Catholic families. In 1782 the second great colonization began, this time organized under emperor Joseph II. Only in Bačka region, 15 villages were founded or repopulated until 1787. Stanišić was one of them. In 1786, some 100 German families from a few years earlier established places like Csátalja, Gakovo, Kruševlje, Kolut and Nemesnádudvar settled down in Stanišić. They originated from Lorraine, Rhineland-Palatinate and Saar region. They built 100 new houses during that summer of 1788 about 200 meters on the eastern, upper grounds than the Serb village existed. The newly built thump-houses were put in two lines with three blocks (one of them left for the church) making the first street (called by Germans Gasse, the future Kirchen Gasse). The new village was proclaimed a separate municipality from the Serb one, and thus called Neu Stanischitz ("New Stanišić"). Stanišić developed very fast and soon became one of the greater villages in the county.

Between 1790 and 1830 (especially between 1812 and 1820) more than 150 new German families moved to Stanišić, mainly from Csátalja (County of Baja, nowadays in Hungary). The number of Serb families decreased, and the number of German families increased from 120 in 1790 to 400 in 1830. About 500 new houses were built until 1830. Also about 45 Hungarian and about 25 Slovak families settled in Stanišić until 1830, however, many of them soon adopted German language, culture and customs and declared themselves as Germans. The total population of Stanišić numbered 2,200 people in 1790 and about 4,600 in 1830. It was more than doubled. In 1790 there was 53% Serbs, 40% Germans and 7% Hungarians, Slovaks and others. But, in 1830 the majority were Germans with 58%, followed with 26% Serbs, 14% Hungarians, 1.5% Jews. The Slovaks declared themselves already by 1830 as Germans or as Slovaks. So, from the early 19th century the German population dominated Stanišić. A great step forward was made in 1811, when both Serb and German parts of village were united in one and Stanišić was proclaimed a market-place by Emperor Franz I. It meant, that Stanišić was allowed to hold a market what was a great improvement compared to other villages in the county.

== Demographics (2002 census) ==
Ethnic groups in the village include:

- 3,511 Serbs (73.02%)
- 367 Croats (7.63%)
- 363 Hungarians (7.55%)
- 140 Yugoslavs (2.91%)
- 24 Bunjevci (0.5%)
- 16 Germans (0.33%)
- 387 Others (8.04%)

== Historical population ==
- 1763: ca. 200
- 1765: ca. 300
- 1768: ca. 400, 88 families
- 1772: ca. 500, 109 families
- 1782: ca. 1,100 (including ca. 1,050 Serbs and ca. 50 Hungarians and Slovaks)
- 1786: ca. 1,400 (mostly Serbs and some Hungarians)
- 1790: ca. 2,200 (settled with some new 100 German families in 1786)
- 1791: 2,282 (1,213 Serbs (53.1%); 1,069 Catholics – ca. 950 Germans & ca. 100 Hungarians & Slovaks)
- 1797: 349 families; 168 Serbian, 161 German, 14 Slovak, 6 Hungarian
- 1798: 2,650 (1,150 Serbs (43%); 1,350 Germans (50%); 150 Slovaks and Hungarians (7%))
- 1815: 4,285 (1,080 Serbs (25%), 3,130 Catholics (ca. 2,500 Germans, ca. 450 Slovaks, ca. 200 Hungarians), 75 Jews; The Slovaks are further listed as Germans or Hungarians)
- 1828: 4,566 (1,200 Serbs, 2,650 Germans, 640 Hungarians, 76 Jews)
- 1834: 4,254
- 1838: 4,529
- 1850: 4,600 (1,100 Serbs, 2,700 Germans, 700 Hungarians, 70 Jews, 30 others)
- 1860: 5,754 (1,100 Serbs, ca. 3,700 Germans, ca. 750 Hungarians, ca. 200 Jews and others)
- 1880: 6,685 (1,100 Serbs, 4,451 Germans, 800 Hungarians, ca. 300 Jews and others)
- 1890: 7,221
- 1900: 6,688 (456 Serbs, 5,084 Germans, 1,112 Hungarians, 4 Slovaks, 70 Jews, etc.)
- 1910: 7,086 (557 Serbs, 5,206 Germans, 1,266 Hungarians, 6 Croats, 106 Jews, 51 others)
- 1921: 7,580 (739 Serbs and Croats, 5,620 Germans, 1,132 Hungarians, 36 Slovaks, etc.)
- 1931: 7,596 (1,285 Serbs and Croats, 5,382 Germans, 911 Hungarians, 7 Slovaks, etc.)
- 1941: 7,579 (580 Serbs, ca. 100 Croats, ca. 5,900 Germans, ca. 900 Hungarians, 12 Jews, 40 Slovaks, some others). Number of families: 1,614 (including 1,410 German, 110 Serbian, 70 Hungarian, 20 Jewish, 10 Croatian); 6,915 Catholics, 580 Orthodox, 46 Greek-Catholic, 6 Evangelists, 17 Evang-Reform.,12 Israelites, 3 others)
- 1945: German population fled or was expelled as a consequence of World War II events, ca. 1,500 inhabitants remained (mainly Serbs and Hungarians, and about 200 Germans) During the war about 1,300 German men were forced into Hungarian or German army corps and moved to the Eastern front, where many were captured. Of that number 242 were killed (65 on the Russian front, 37 in Hungary, 140 elsewhere, etc.), and many others were captured. Of some 4,400 German civilians who remained at their homes in Stanischitsch, only 126 inhabitants fled before the Red Army came into the village on October 20, 1944. Many were then arrested and forced into labour camps, to Sombor and Mitrovica, others, including 360 young women and men deported into Russian labour camps in Sybiria. Some 160 died there and never returned. About 3,500 civil men, women and children were captured in the village and soon on August 10, 1945 deported into neighbouring death camps in Krusevlje and Gakovo, where many of them remained until March 1948. About 500 were soon returned to the home village to work for the new authorities. At least 450 people died in these camps, others, more than 1,000 fled from these camps during 1946/47 to Austria. During the flight at least 20 people were shot dead. About 2,000 people were released in 1948 and most of them emigrated to West Germany between 1952 and 1964.

The total number of German civil casualties was at least 923 or 15% of its pre-war population, which numbered about 5,800. Of that number, 520 were civil victims of death-camps in Yugoslavia, and some 160 of Russian labour camps, killings and torture, and 242 were listed as war victims. The deaths were registered in following camps: 171 person died in Gakova, 100 in Krusevlje, 103 in Stanischitsch itself, 43 in Sremska Mitrovica, 14 in Sombor, 2 in Miletic, 2 in Rudolfsgnad, 8 in Jarek, 1 in Karlsdorf, 1 in Karavukovo, and 1 in Bajmok. More than 52 soldiers died as prisoners-of-war in Russia. There were only 181 (~3%) Germans registered in Stanischitsch on March 31, 1948.

- 1945–46: ca. 3,000 Serbs and 2,500 Croats from Dalmatia settled (in total 1029 families with 5430 people)
- 1947–50: Many families turned back to Dalmatia, mostly Croats
- 1948: 7,741 (3,763 Serbs, 2,480 Croats, 1,224 Hungarians, 181 Germans, etc.)
- 1953: 7,814
- 1961: 7,521 (4,464 Serbs (59.4%), 8 Yugoslavs, 1,019 Hungarians (13.5%), 1,814 Croats (24.1%), 26 Macedonians, etc.)
- 1971: 6,156 (3, 256 Serbs, 845 Croats, 758 Hungarians, 918 Yugoslavs, 9 Montenegrins, etc.)
- 1981: 5,476 (2, 804 Serbs, 492 Croats, 584 Hungarians, 1522 Yugoslavs, etc.)
- 1991: 5,131 (3,140 Serbs (61.2%), 946 Yugoslavs (18.44%), 459 Hungarians (8.95%), 454 Croats (8.85%) and 18 Germans)
- 2002: 4,808 (3,511 Serbs, 367 Croats, 363 Hungarians, 140 Yugoslavs, 9 Macedonians, 8 Montenegrins, 4 Slovaks, 24 Bunjevacs, 16 Germans, 2 Slovenians, 1 Bosniak, 353 others, etc.)
- 2006 (estimation): 4,797
- 2011: 3,971

== Sport ==
- Football Club Stanisic

== See also ==
- List of places in Serbia
- List of cities, towns and villages in Vojvodina
- Irinej Bulović
- Josip Stanišić
