= Ervin Bossányi =

Hungarian artist (1891–1975)

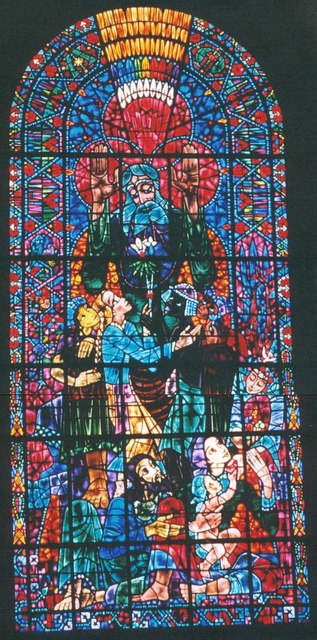
"Peace" (1956), one of two large windows by Ervin Bossanyi facing south in the south transept of Canterbury Cathedral, close to one by the Arts & Crafts master Christopher Whall.

Ervin Bossányi (3 March 1891 in Rigyica / Riđica, Austria-Hungary – 11 July 1975 in Eastcote in Greater London, England) was a Hungarian artist, who worked mainly in northern Germany until his emigration in 1934. He then started a new career as a notable stained glass artist in England.

== Biography ==
Bossányi was born in a small village in Vojvodina, southern Austria-Hungary, and educated in Budapest. In World War I he was interned for five years in France. After the war he became a notable painter and sculptor in Lübeck and (1929) in Hamburg. A major work from this period is his fountain in Bad Segeberg. In 1934, he left Nazi Germany for England. Here he specialized with remarkable success in stained glass. He made stained glass windows for the University of London (Goldsmiths Library in the Senate House Library), Tate Gallery ("The Angel Blesses the Women Washing the Clothes"), the Victoria and Albert Museum ("Noli me tangere"), as well as cathedral glass for the York Minster, the memorial chapel for President Woodrow Wilson in Washington National Cathedral in Washington D.C. and Canterbury Cathedral. He also created the windows in the chapel at Michaelhouse in South Africa, and the stained glass windows at Uxbridge tube station in London. The latter depict the coats of arms of Uxbridge U.D.C. and of the counties of Middlesex and Buckinghamshire. Fitted shortly after the station opened in 1938 they were removed for safe-keeping during World War 2 and reinstated in 1949.

== Museums ==
- The Stained Glass Museum at Ely Cathedral owns two windows Bossanyi made in his last year in Hamburg and which he took with him into emigration.
- Behnhaus, Lübeck - paintings
