= Kruševlje =

Kruševlje Крушевље (Serbian)
- Location within Serbia
- Coordinates: 45°55′57″N 19°06′01″E
- Country: Serbia
- Province: Vojvodina
- Time zone: UTC+1 (CET)
  - Summer (DST): UTC+2 (CEST)

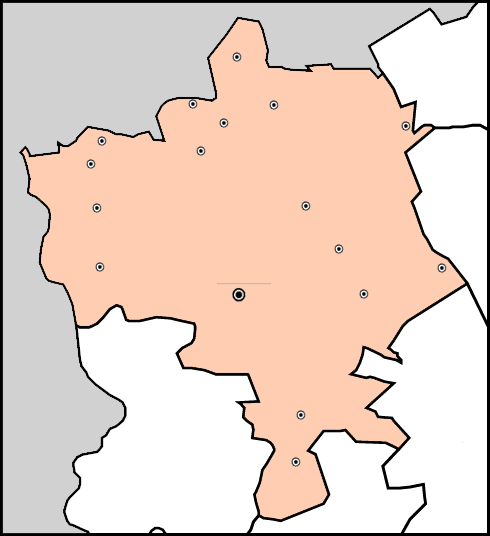

Kruševlje (Serbian Cyrillic: Крушевље) is a small settlement (hamlet) in Serbia. It is situated in the Sombor municipality, West Bačka District, Vojvodina province. It is mostly populated by Serbs.

== Name ==
In Serbian, the village is known as Kruševlje or Крушевље, in German as Kruschiwel or Kruschiwl, and in Hungarian as Körtés or Bácskörtés. The name Körtés is derived from the Hungarian word körte ("pear"). The Serbian name is derived from the Serbian word kruška ("pear") and corresponds to the Hungarian Körtés. There were also some other, less used names such as Kruschewlje, Birndorf (a German translation of the Hungarian name Körtés), Krušovje, Körtvélyes, etc.

== Geography ==
Officially, Kruševlje is not classified as a separate settlement, but as part of the village of Gakovo. It is located near the border with Hungary between Riđica, Stanišić, Gakovo and Rastina.

It is about 2 miles northeast of the neighbouring village of Gakovo and about 2,5 miles west of Stanišić. About 5 miles to the north is the village Riđica and the nearest town is Sombor, about 12 miles to the South. The whole area surrounding Kruševlje is a flat ground, with a number of swampy meadows, fens, bad-fruitful salt-spring fields. The villagers had some fruitful gardens, corn fields, hemp-and wheat fields, vineyards a few miles to the North. The village is about 305 feet (93 meters) above the sea level. There are no hills, woods or rivers.

== History ==
=== Serb village ===
The earliest appearance of this settlement is recorded by Hungarians in 1520 as Körtvélyes, and again in 1598 as Kruševlje in some Turkish lists, but it is certainly evident that it existed even earlier. During the Late Middle Ages (14th-16th century) it was populated with Serb nomads and cattle-breeders, a number of whom lived there only temporarily and built a few small wooden-or mudd-cottages and huts.

During the Ottoman rule (1541–1687) the village of Kruševlje was populated by ethnic Serbs and the nearest Turkish stronghold was in Sombor, about 12 miles to the south, but living there was hard and dangerous, because the Turks were cruel and ruthless to all those who did not or could not pay all the taxes, that they demanded. All the Hungarian and a lot of Serb population of all southern parts of the Pannonian Plain that were administered by the Kingdom of Hungary fled to the north before the Turks arrived and Kruševlje was also deserted by the time.

It was resettled by a dozen or so Serb cattle-breeders, but they again had to flee in 1598 when the whole area was devastated by the Tatar forces, arriving there as Turkish vassals. It was then in that same year, that the village of Kruševlje is recorded for the first time, mentioning its inhabitants as Turkish serfs and tenantfarmers who fled with their village-leader named Mihajlo to the town of Esztergom in the northern part of Hungary.

It was resettled again some years later, and in 1633, it was recorded as a small Serb village. It was mentioned also in 1650, when the inhabitants of Kruševlje were paying some 12 Forints taxation to the Archbishopric of Kalocsa. In 1654, it is written, that the Hungarian Palatinate, Count Wesselényi rewards János Darvas with the Kruševlje estate to be his beneficiary for life, as he was the Serbian vice-mayor of the Hungarian town of Nagrad near Pest.

Again in 1659, there is another mentioning of Kruševlje benefactors, Peter Patay and Đuro Dulo. In the year before, it was György Szalatanyi. Everything was of course, only symbolical. The Turks were banished from most of the Pannonian Plain during the Great Turkish War (1683–1699), and Kruševlje itself came under Habsburg rule with the complete Bačka area in September 1687 by the victorious troops under the Imperial Prince Eugene of Savoy.

=== Danube Swabian village ===
In the early 18th century, Kruševlje was again abandoned, and later mentioned in 1740 as a part of county named Somborski Šanac (English: The Trench of Sombor). It was noted down as puszta, meaning in Hungarian wasted, deserted, empty land. It is similarly recorded again in 1746 on the land map made by Anton Karlschmidt. It is possible however, that some Serb soldiers of the military border had been living in Kruševlje between 1720 and 1746. As the military border was abolished in 1746, they moved away and in 1746 it was called puszta again.

The new page in the history of Kruševlje came with the colonization of southern Pannonian Plain administered by the Habsburg Monarchy. It was well planned and organized by the state officials in Vienna court. The newly conquered lands had to be populated, this time by Danube Swabian colonists. During the rule of Empress Maria Theresa of Habsburg there was a great colonization in this great Danube area between 1762 and 1768 and again during the rule of her son the Emperor Joseph II between 1784 and 1787. More than 20 settlements were populated only in this area. Kruševlje was settled with Danube Swabian colonists mostly during the first colonization, although some families came later as well.

Anton von Cothmann, the Director of the Imperial Estates in this area and the Chief-Commissioner for colonization visited this land in 1763 and ordered Puszta Krusivle to be settled as soon as possible, as well as the neighbouring Puszta Gakova. The villages of Gakovo and Kruševlje were settled in 1767, though Gakovo was built larger, settling about 230 families and while Kruševlje was home to only about 70. Even later, multiple families from Gakovo were urged to settle down in Kruševlje, because there was more free space. German colonists used the name Kruschiwelj for the village, which was modified version of original Serbian name.

The majority of those colonist families came on floats called Ulmer Schachtel by the river Danube travelling about two or three weeks from the German Imperial town of Ulm, where they were called to gather mostly from the Imperial estates in Lorraine, Alsace, Rhineland, and the Electorate of the Palatinate (German: Pfalz). There were also some families who came from other parts of Southwest Germany, mostly from County of Baden, Württemberg, Bavaria, Swabia, Bohemia and Moravia, as well as from some decades earlier established colonist villages in Hungary administered by the Habsburg Monarchy, like in the Counties of Tolna, Pest, Buda and Baranya. They all were given some food, cattle, tools and instruments for living and lately some lands, all this for free, as it was a state-organized colonization.

In later years (especially in the 1780s and in the early 19th century), more Swabian families moved to Kruševlje from the neighbouring villages of Gakovo, Kolut, Csátalja, Gara, Katymár, etc., but it remained a mostly conservative society. The greatest group came in 1780 from the French-speaking part of Lorraine, and were soon Swabianized in Kruševlje. These are the French families like Depre, Settele, Schira, Lewang, Gosse, Frantzem, Lattele (all their family names are here spelled in German). There were later also some Hungarian family names like Wirag, Kerescher, Lombocs and Ujwari and Bunjevac like Kusanitsch who all were Swabianized as well. It is recorded in 1936, some 156 years after their arrival, that the family of Gosse still kept their Bible written in French, although they didn't speak French for generations.

Some families from Kruševlje resettled later into Stanišić, Gakovo, Baja or Sombor. There were more than 140 family names in Kruševlje. The first Jewish family was recorded in 1779 and they were, as usual, shopkeepers and merchants.

During the 1760s and the 1770s, the Kruševlje people built their new village in their own German style: long, wide main street, called in German: Die Kirchengasse or die Hauptgasse, three short Kreuzgassen, and long, but narrow family houses, always whitewashed, including two rooms, a kitchen, a stable (stall) and a shed. All the houses were stamped with mud and roofed with cane. About 120–130 years later all houses were remodelled, enlarged and made of bricks with fine facades and ornaments. Behind the houses were the family gardens, and every home had its own well or pump later.

They built a small Catholic church in the middle of their main street as early as in 1770. Their priest and their religion remained central to village life. Every Sunday almost the complete population was gathered in or round the church for the morning mass. Since 1785, Kruševlje had its own Catholic parish. The village school was also soon built, and in 1789, it is recorded, the schoolteacher was János Szikra. After him, as the Kruševlje teachers served Jakob Kirstner, Simon Scheidler, Ferdinand Klemm, and from 1888 Franz Schamberger. There was always only one teacher, even if there were more than 150 pupils in the end of the 19th century.

Kruševlje was developing fast during the end of the 18th and at the beginning of the 19th century. More German families were settled down, new houses were built, the streets were lengthened and planted with acacia and mulberry-trees. In 1818, a new, larger church was built, and later a small cemetery chapel. In 1822, in Kruševlje lived 803 Germans and 6 Jews in more than 150 houses. The main occupations of Kruševlje villagers were agriculture (mostly wheat and maize, called Kukrutz in Swabian), cattle-breeding (mainly livestock - cows, pigs, oxen, bulls and some poultry), silk-worm raising, later also hemp cultivating and manufacture. Of course, a number of men were craftsmen (mainly bricklayers, blacksmiths, rope-makers, joiners, etc.).

Every family kept horses, carriages, carts and later tractors and threshing machines. Some families had also a house in its fields, called Sallasch, where they kept more livestock and some serving-men. A number of families from Kruševlje possessed their fields and vineyards to the north, towards Riđica, because all the other land parts were pasture-grounds, grassland, fens, or saltfields unsuitable for cultivation and tillage. Saltpetre excavating was also one of Kruševlje's main jobs. It was used instead of oily soda for soap-making. Along all the village and field streets thousands of mulberry-trees were planted and the silk-worm breeding was a profitable job for the entire region as well as the hemp cultivating and selling to the hemp factories in Stanišić or Prigrevica.

The railroad was built in 1895 connecting Sombor and Baja and it passed Kruševlje about two miles to the south. In the beginning, the inhabitants of Kruševlje had to go to Stanišić or Gakovo railroad stations, both about 3 miles away. But in 1912, a small station was built south of the village, so that the inhabitants had their own station, which was later in 1924 connected with the village by narrow railroad-track. It was originally built for cargo-wagons, but it was used also for civil traffic.

The wagons were pulled by horses and later by a locomotive to the main railroad where the travellers had to wait for the train. The narrow railroad was removed in 1948, and the main railroad was used for passengers until 1979 and for cargo-transport until 1991, but was never removed. Kruševlje was electrified in 1925 from Stanišić, had a steam-mill, a library, a four-class primary school, a nursery-garden, a silk-manufactory and was a fairly prosperous community.

The population number was increasing fast, and by 1878, Kruševlje had 968 inhabitants, by 1890, 1,092 inhabitants, by 1910, 976 inhabitants, by 1921 935 inhabitants. In the 1830s and in the 1870s, there were outbursts of cholera, dysentery and fever and a number of people died within a few days. By the year of 1831 there was even a plague in Kruševlje which returned again in 1868 killing some families as well.

In the 1890s and especially between the years of 1900 and 1914, dozens of families emigrated to the United States. In 1940, in Kruševlje was 907 inhabitants and in 1941 had about 940, about 150 people less than 50 years before. There were 172 houses in 1890, about 200 in 1921 and 225 houses in 1940. During World War I more than 250 men from Kruševlje participated as soldiers in Austro-Hungarian army, and more than 150 were killed or wounded, mostly in Galicia on the Eastern front.

=== Between WWI and WWII ===
In 1918, the village occupied by the newly formed Kingdom of Serbs, Croats and Slovenes, called Yugoslavia since 1929. The border with Hungary was just about 5 miles to the north. In common life, there were no major changes. In 1924, rich landowners were deprived from their estates according to the new reforms. The Germans founded their cultural society called later Kulturbund and during the 1930s some minor families were sympathising the Nazi Party. As Kruševlje was mainly populated by Germans, there were no national problems as it was in other parts of Yugoslavia in those years.

=== World War II and aftermath ===
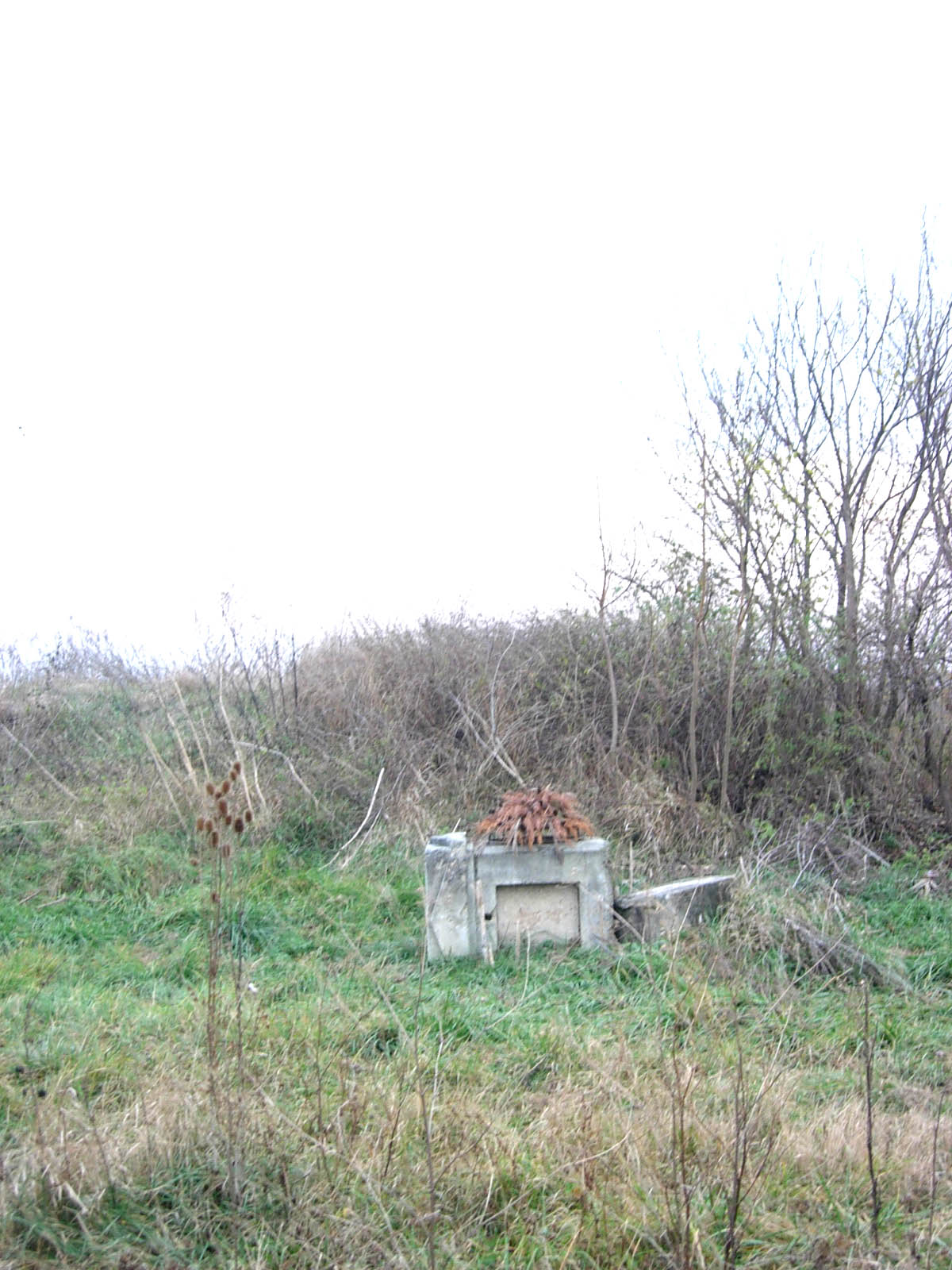
Kruševlje. The Roman Catholic church stood here until the 1950s.

During April 1941, when the World War II started, Yugoslavia was occupied and Bačka was annexed by Hungary. Since 1942 some inhabitants of Kruševlje (less than 50 men) joined the SS-troops and went to the Russian front. In 1943 more young men were mobilized and almost all men in 1944.

The villagers also sent some aid in food and clothes to the Eastern front and Germany, and there was no other role in the war campaign. When it became clear in October 1944, that the Soviet Army and the Yugoslav partisans will be soon there, and that the war was lost, some German village populations were forced to evacuate by German military commanders. But, a number of them wanted to remain because they felt not guilty for any crimes. Only several families fled from Kruševlje in October 1944 before the Soviet Red Army came. The last German chairman of the village council was Franz Peller.

On October 20, 1944, the partisans came from Stanišić and entered into Kruševlje. The next day, October 21 arrests started. Almost all remaining men were taken prisoners. The entire German population was proclaimed collaborator of the Third Reich and deprived from all their civilian rights and property. On Christmas Day 1944, about 60 young men and women were taken to Siberia to work in Russian mines.

=== Modern history ===
As empty villages in 1948, Kruševlje and Gakovo were repopulated with Greek and Macedonian refugees of the Civil war in Greece which ended in 1946. They were all communist families and were settled down in former German-populated village of Maglić in Bačka, but were resettled to Gakovo and Kruševlje in 1948 and 1949. They numbered about 4,000 people, but were again resettled 1951–52 to Macedonia. Kruševlje and Gakovo became again empty villages.

However, Gakovo was soon settled by some Serb and Croat families from the neighbourhood, and Kruševlje too. All were farming families. In Kruševlje, there were about 280 people in about 70 houses by 1953. All other houses, about 150, were sold and pulled down between 1951 and 1960; even the church was pulled down in 1958. The population soon began to move away, and by 1981, Kruševlje numbered only 150 inhabitants living in about 25 homes. Other houses were pulled down, and there are no marks today that there was a nice village in the past. The remaining 17 houses are in ruins. Kruševlje was separate settlement until 1971 when it was officially joined to the village of Gakovo. Nowadays, Kruševlje is mostly deserted village, with only 14 homes and less than 30 inhabitants.

== Historical population ==
- 1765-67: circa 80 German colonist families settled, cca. 400-500 inhabitants, all German
- 1780: circa 600 inhabitants, all German and some newly French settled families
- 1800: circa 700 inhabitants
- 1822: 809 inhabitants, 803 Germans, 6 Jews
- 1878: 968 inhabitants
- 1880: 952 inhabitants, 863 Germans (90.6%)
- 1890: 1,048 inhabitants, 172 houses, 1,024 Germans (98.2%), 14 Hungarians, 10 Jews
- 1910: 976 inhabitants, 200 houses, 954 Germans (97.8%)
- 1921: 935 inhabitants, 210 houses, 920 Germans (98.4%)
- 1940: 907 inhabitants, 225 houses, 895 Germans (98.7%)
- 1941: 950 inhabitants, 936 Germans (98.5%)
- 1948-51: circa 4,000 Macedonian and Greek refugees
- 1953: 282 inhabitants, 50 families,
- 1961: 253 inhabitants, 45 families, cca. 50 houses, about 170 razed 1951-61
- 1971: 211 inhabitants, 40 families
- 1977: circa 150 inhabitants, 35 families in 27 houses (Families: 28 Serbian, 3 Hungarian, 3 Croatian, 1 German)
- 1991: circa 35 inhabitants, 17 families in 17 houses
- 2002: circa 30 inhabitants, 13 families, 17 houses (4 abandoned)

== See also ==
- Gakovo
- List of places in Serbia
- List of cities, towns and villages in Vojvodina
