= Radoslav Samardžić =

Serbian footballer

Personal information
- Date of birth: 17 October 1970 (age 56)
- Place of birth: Karavukovo, SR Serbia, SFR Yugoslavia
- Height: 1.80 m (5 ft 11 in)
- Positions: Forward; left winger

Youth career
- Vojvodina

Senior career*
Years	Team	Apps	(Gls)
1990–1995	Vojvodina	125	(44)
1995–1997	Volendam	57	(15)
1997–1999	Heerenveen	65	(24)
1999–2002	Feyenoord	14	(1)
2001	→ RKC Waalwijk (loan)	15	(0)
2002–2003	Heerenveen	5	(0)
Total		281	(84)

International career
1995	FR Yugoslavia	1	(0)
- * Club domestic league appearances and goals

Radoslav "Sami" Samardžić (Serbian Cyrillic: Радослав Самарџић; born 17 October 1970) is a Serbian retired footballer who played as a forward.

== Club career ==
Between 1990 and 1995, Samardžić played five seasons for Vojvodina, scoring 44 league goals in 125 appearances. He subsequently went abroad and spent two seasons with Dutch club Volendam. In 1997, Samardžić was transferred to Heerenveen.

In August 1999, Samardžić signed a four-year deal with Feyenoord. He was loaned to RKC Waalwijk in February 2001. In February 2002, Samardžić terminated his contract with Feyenoord by mutual agreement.

== International career ==
At international level, Samardžić was capped once for FR Yugoslavia in 1995, when he only played three minutes in the 1995 Carlsberg Cup final against South Korea.
