= Kljajićevo =

Kljajićevo Кљајићево (Serbian)
- Village (Selo)
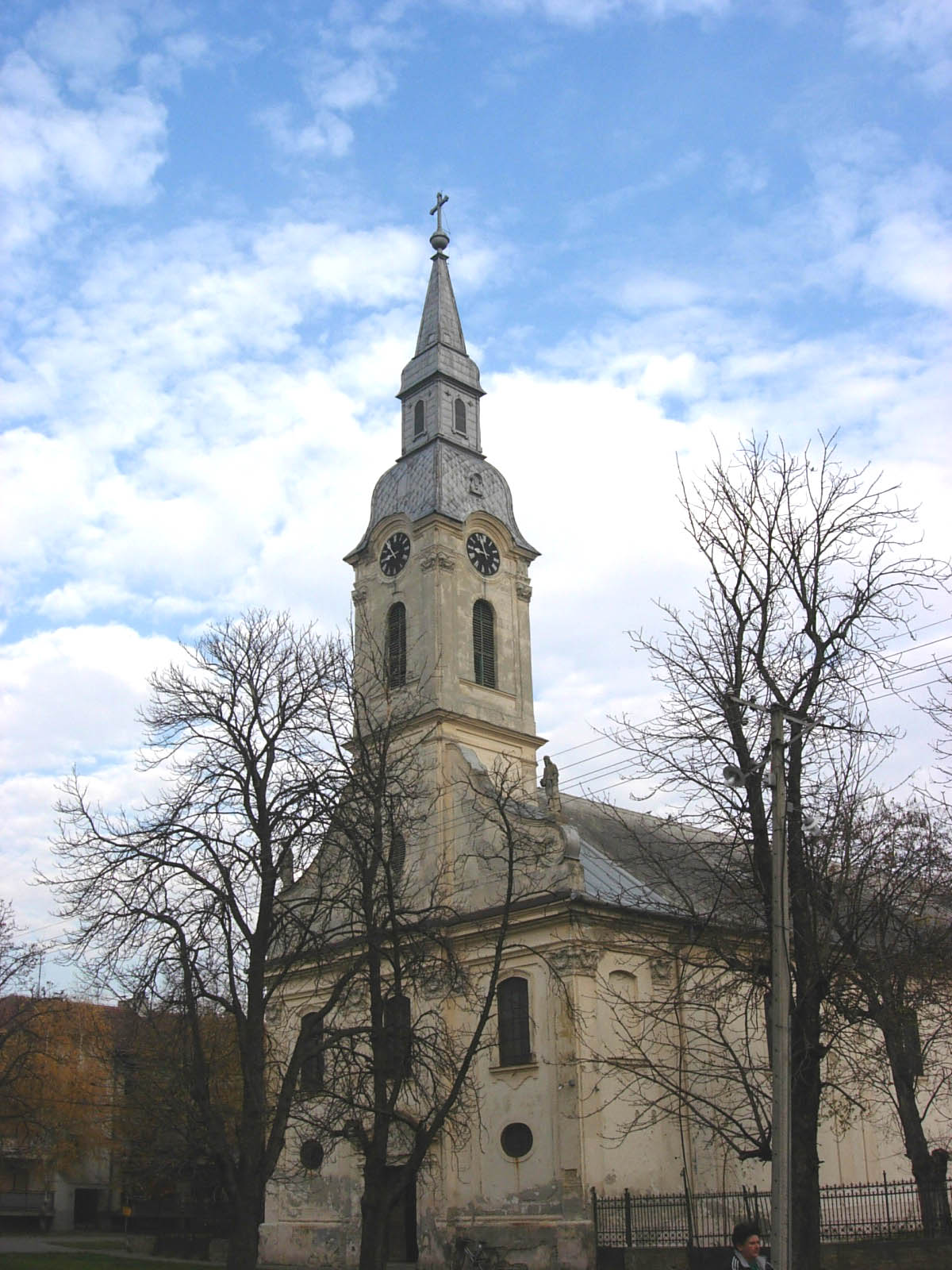
- The Visitation of Blessed Virgin Mary Catholic Church

- Location within Vojvodina Location within Serbia Location within Europe
- Coordinates: 45°46′N 19°17′E
- Country: Serbia
- Province: Vojvodina
- Region: Bačka
- District: West Bačka
- Municipality: Sombor
- Elevation: 285 ft (87 m)

Population (2002)
  - Total: 6,012
- Time zone: UTC+1 (CET)
  - Summer (DST): UTC+2 (CEST)

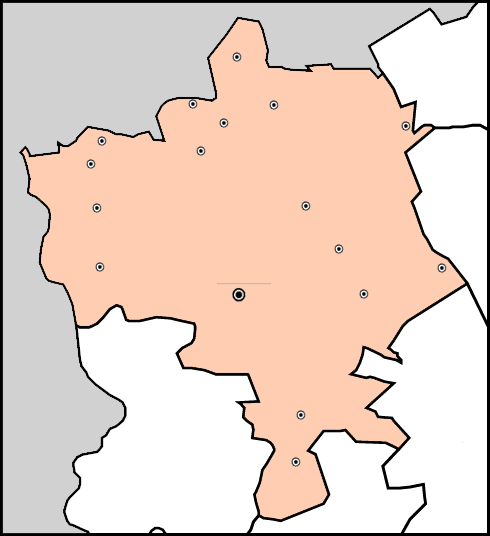

Kljajićevo (Serbian Cyrillic: Кљајићево) is a village in Serbia. It is situated in the Sombor municipality, in the West Bačka District, Vojvodina province. The village has a Serb ethnic majority and its population numbered 6,012 people (2002 census).

== Name ==
In Serbian the village is known as Kljajićevo (Кљајићево), in Croatian as Kljajićevo, in Hungarian as Kerény, in German as Kernei or Gernei, and in Rusyn as Кляїчево.

== History ==
=== Older settlements ===
Human settlement in the territory of present-day Kljajićevo has been traced as far back as the Stone Age. In 1391, during the administration of the Kingdom of Hungary, settlement named Szent Király (Sveti Kralj) was mentioned at this location.

=== Ottoman administration ===
During the Ottoman administration (16th–17th centuries), Bačka was part of the Sanjak of Segedin (Szeged). The former Hungarian population escaped during the Ottoman conquest and the area was then populated mostly by ethnic Serbs from the south. The village firstly was mentioned in 1590 in the Ottoman tax-lists (Defters) as Kernja, a settlement near Sombor. Settlement was also mentioned under name Krnjaja in 1601 and was populated by ethnic Serbs. In the early 1700s Serbs managed cattle ranches in this area as part of the Austrian border defenses against the Ottoman Empire, and the area remained sparsely settled until the 1760s when the first Danube Swabians (who called themselves Shwoveh after the Serbian "Svabos" - Švabe) were settled in 100 new houses.

=== Habsburg administration ===
In 1699 the Bačka came into the possession of the Habsburg monarchy of Austria. After Maria Theresa of Austria assumed the throne in 1740, she encouraged vigorous colonization on crown lands, first of the Military Frontier and then of the entire nearby area, whose original Serb population had been decimated following the Great Turkish War.

In 1763, the Imperial Advisor Anton von Cothmann, proposed to his Empress Theresia that Kernei and the surrounding territory should be settled. According to the "Conscriptio" from December 21, 1765, a new village was resettled and newly founded with 17 families, 57% of whom were ethnic Germans. Among those there were farmers, 2 smiths, 1 carpenter, 1 weaver and one innkeeper. The new settlers were primarily from Austrian possessions in Germany, Hungarians, and Bohemians; however, all the German-speaking settlers were commonly referred to as Danube Swabian and came to call themselves "Schwowe" (Shwoveh). The village now was called “Kernjaja” or "Kernyaja". (Although the settlement had many official names over the years, it was always pronounced "Gernei" and written Kernei by its Shwovish inhabitants until 1945.)

In the following decades the number of settlers increased yearly, reaching 291 families arriving in Kernjaja between 1794/1796, among them 83% Germans, 11% Hungarians and 6% Bohemians. Joseph II, Holy Roman Emperor from Austria extended the village with 78 new houses. The Catholic Church was built in 1791. At the beginning of 1767 pupils were taught in the cantor's house. The new school was built in 1911. The church has since been converted into an Orthodox Christian church.

In the year 1805, Kernei had 2,000 inhabitants. When the number of people reached 3,500 in 1850, the proportion of the non-German-speaking population was less than 5 percent. At that time there were roughly 50 Jews in the village, with their own graveyard and street, but the last Jews left sometime around 1910.

The first migration away from Kernei to newly established settlements began around 1866. Beginning around 1900 a great wave of emigration to North America began. This led to local population numbers oscillating from year to year such that the town did not reach the 5,000 mark until 1910.

=== Yugoslav administration ===
In 1918, as part of Banat, Bačka and Baranja, Krnjaja became part of the Kingdom of Serbia, which later together with the Kingdom of Montenegro and the State of Slovenes, Croats and Serbs formed the Kingdom of Serbs, Croats and Slovenes (renamed to Yugoslavia in 1929). Between 1929 and 1941, the village was part of the Danube Banovina, one of the provinces of the Kingdom of Yugoslavia.

=== World War II ===
In 1941/42, the population of the village totaled about 6,000. When Axis Powers invaded and partitioned Yugoslavia in 1941, Krnjaja was placed under Hungarian administration. Under an agreement between Germany and Hungary, a local Nazi, Karl Gartner, became the "Ortsleiter" / "Town Leader" of Kernei. In October 1944 about half of the town fled the advancing Russian and Partisan armies. Another approximately 1000 men were in the German SS and Armed forces fighting the Russians and Partisans, and so away from the town. During the Battle of Batina, the front was stretched all the way to Apatin and Bogojevo, and these places became military bases overnight. Many Kerneiers were forced to work on the front lines digging trenches and clearing roads. After October 1944, and the arrival of Yugoslav partisans, Krnjaja came under Yugoslav military administration. In December 1944, 340 young men and women were forcibly enslaved as war reparations to the Soviet Union to work in labor camps. On March 3, 1945, 2,325 Kerneiers were interned in Gakovo and Kruševlje. 242 Kerneiers, mainly Hungarian, were left in Kernei and not interned in the camps. Many, perhaps most, of the internees gradually escaped in 1946 and 47 after 706 died in the camps, mainly in 1945 to 1946.

The antifascist council for the liberation of Yugoslavia (AVNOJ) declared its mainly Danube Swabian population German public enemies and voided their citizenship and all civil rights.

=== Modern Kljajićevo ===
After World War II, Krnjaja became part of the new Socialist Yugoslavia, within the People's Republic of Serbia and the Autonomous Province of Vojvodina. In this time, Serbs from Croatia (Lika, Gorski Kotar, Žumberak, and Kordun) began living in the abandoned, expropriated buildings in the village. The current name of the village, Kljajićevo, was introduced in 1949 and derives from Miloš Kljajić, a popular hero who was born in Kordun and was killed in Žumberak in 1944. The streets are still lined with the acacia trees planted by the Shwovish settlers, and they bloom in magnificent profusion in the spring.

== Historical population ==
- 1869: 4,071 in 460 houses
- 1880: 4,012 in 583 houses
- 1890: 4,368
- 1900: 4,692 in 1,001 houses
- 1910: 5,132
- 1921: 5,314
- 1941: 6,001
- 1944: 6,347
- 1945 (February): 2,567
- 1945 (March): 242
- 1961: 6,088
- 1971: 5,805
- 1981: 5,850
- 1991: 5,737

== Gallery ==
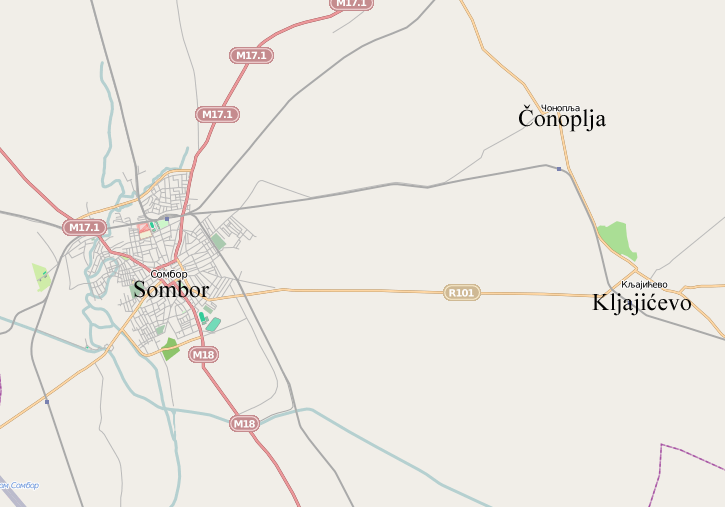
Map of Kljajićevo and the neighborhood.

== See also ==
- List of places in Serbia
- List of cities, towns and villages in Vojvodina
