= Rastina =

Rastina Растина (Serbian)
- Village (Selo)
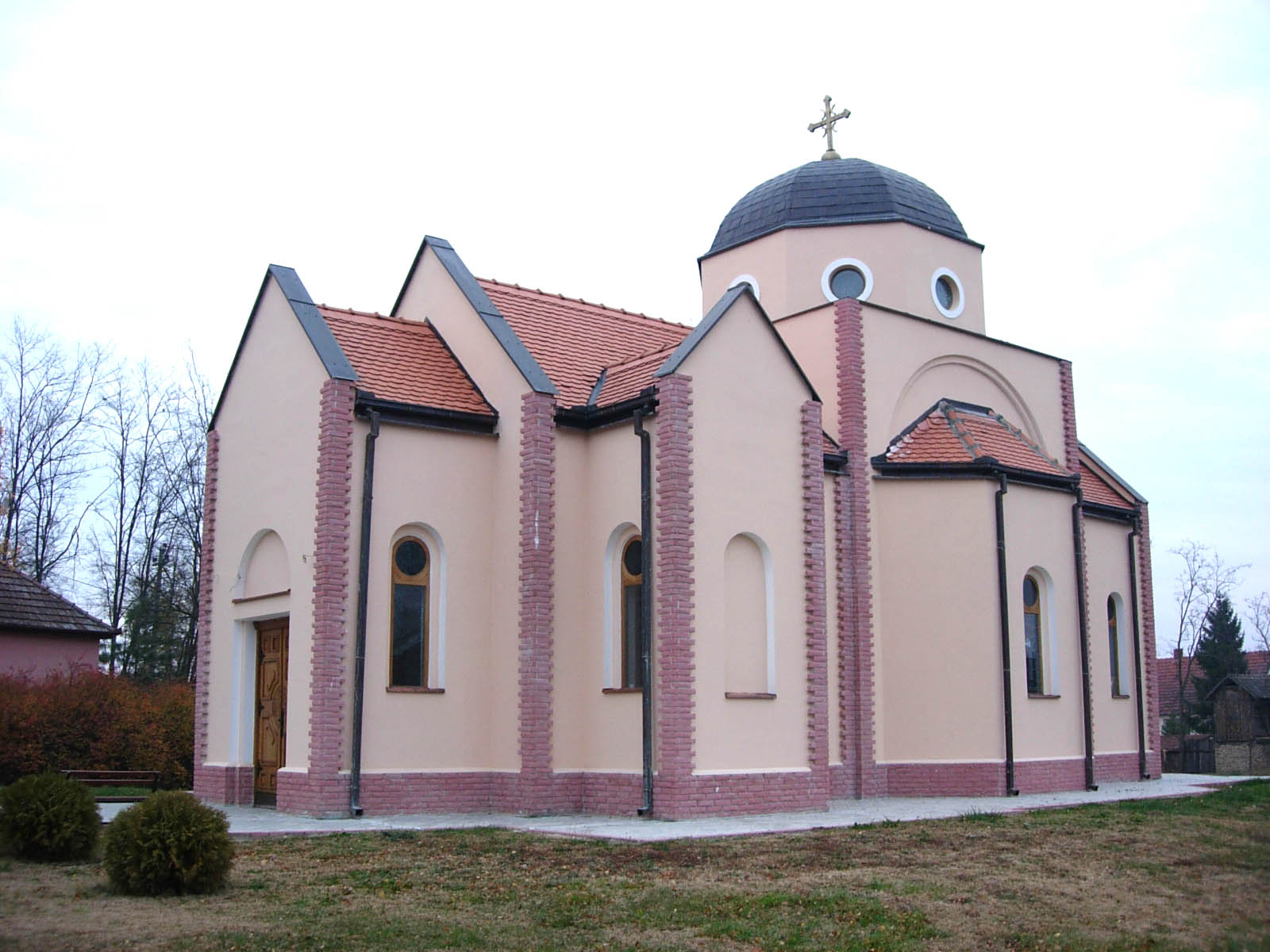
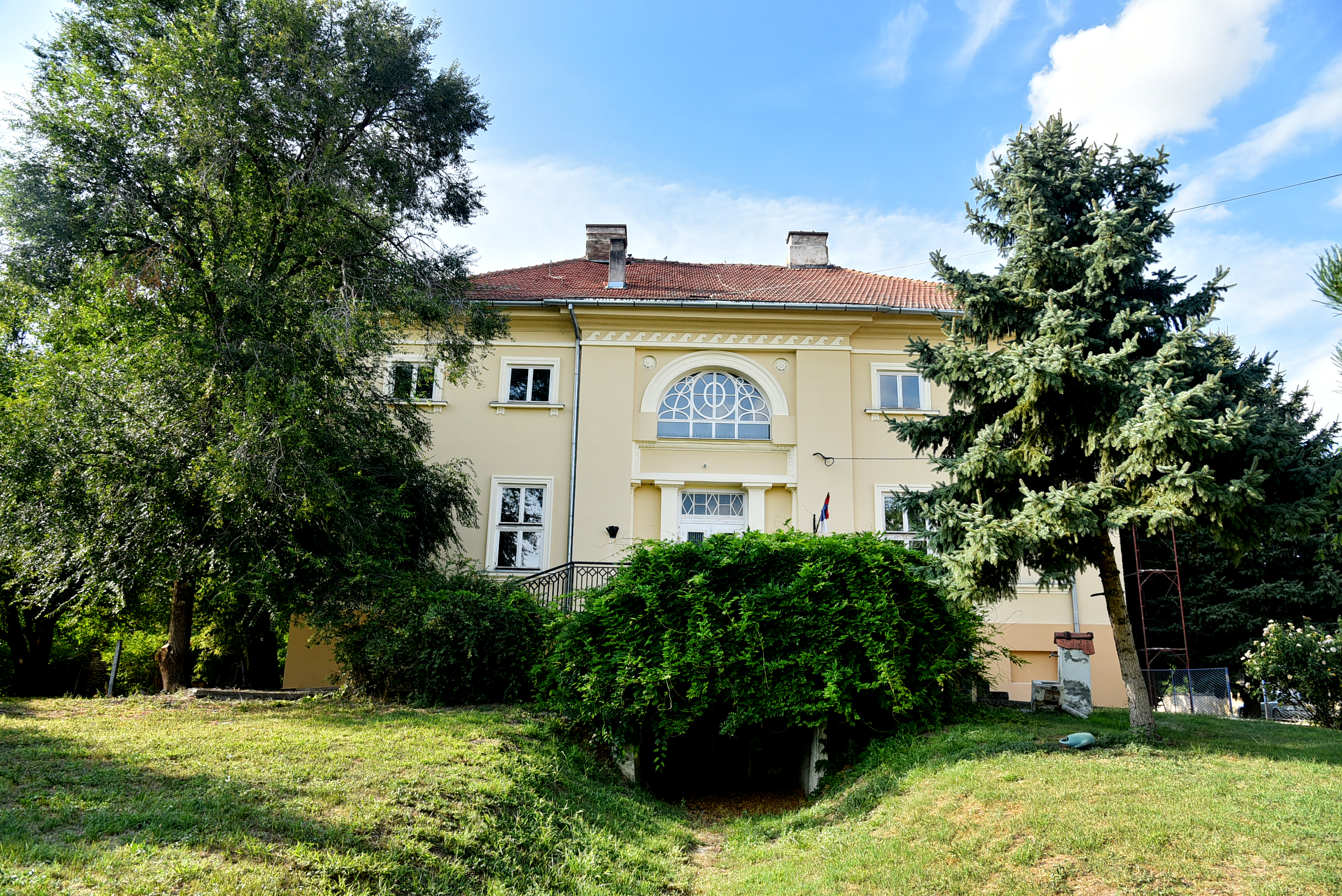
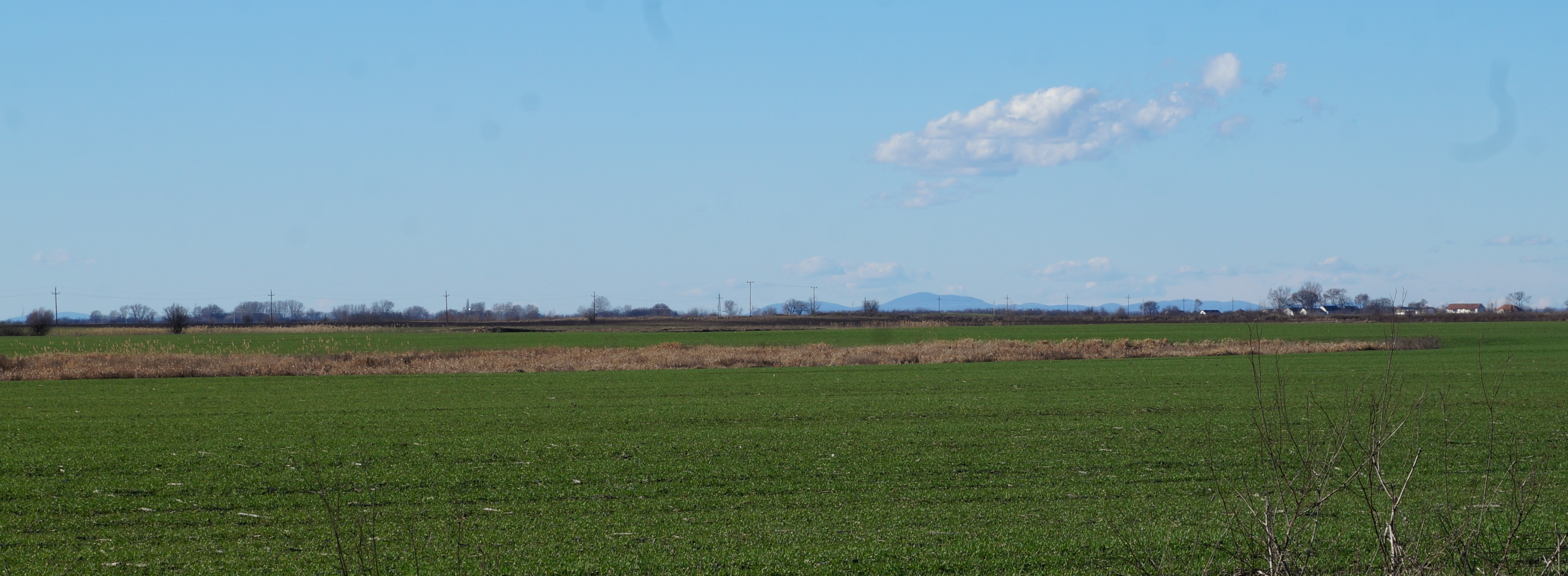
- Serbian Orthodox Church Redl Castle Countryside with Mecsek mountain (Hungary) in the background

- Location within Vojvodina Location within Serbia Location within Europe
- Coordinates: 45°57′33.84″N 19°2′8.16″E
- Country: Serbia
- Province: Vojvodina
- Region: Bačka
- District: West Bačka
- Municipality: Sombor

Population (2011)
  - Total: 410
- Time zone: UTC+1 (CET)
  - Summer (DST): UTC+2 (CEST)

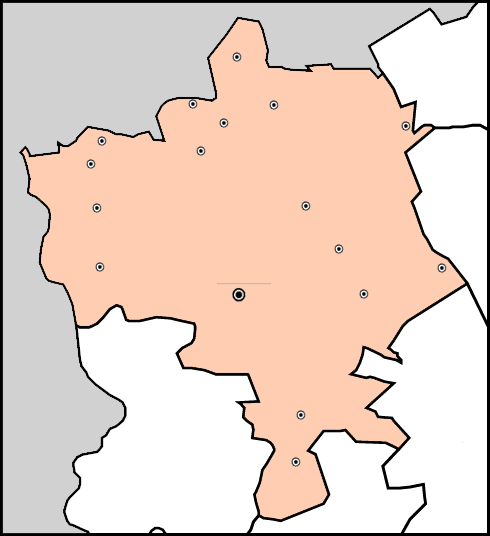

Rastina (Serbian Cyrillic: Растина) is a village located in the Sombor municipality, in the West Bačka District, Vojvodina province in northern Serbia, at the border with Hungary. The village has a Serb ethnic majority and a population of 410 people (2011 census).

== Name ==
In Serbian, the village is known as Rastina (Растина), in Croatian as Rastina and in Hungarian as Haraszti or Rasztina.

== History ==
It was first mentioned in the 14th century as Harasti during the administration of the Kingdom of Hungary. During the Ottoman rule (16th-17th century), Rastina was populated by ethnic Serbs. In the first half of the 19th century, it was in possession of Baron Redl. In the second half of the 19th century, Rastina was not regarded as a separate settlement but as part of Stanišić, while until the end of the Second World War, it was regarded as part of Riđica. It was officially proclaimed a separate settlement after World War II. After World War I, Rastina was settled by volunteers from Lika and Herzegovina.

== Demographics ==
=== Historical population ===
Population of the village in history:

- 1948: 905
- 1953: 939
- 1961: 960
- 1971: 892
- 1981: 686
- 1991: 605
- 2002: 566
- 2011: 410

=== Ethnic groups (2002) ===
  - Serbs: 543 (95,93%)
  - Others: 23

== See also ==
- List of places in Serbia
- List of cities, towns and villages in Vojvodina
