= Nagybaracska =

- Location of Nagybaracska
- Coordinates: 46.0500°N 18.9000°E
- Country: Hungary
- County: Bács-Kiskun

Area
  - Total: 37.95 km^{2} (14.65 sq mi)

Population (2015)
  - Total: 2,289
  - Density: 65/km^{2} (170/sq mi)
- Time zone: UTC+1 (CET)
  - Summer (DST): UTC+2 (CEST)
- Postal code: 6527
- Area code: 79

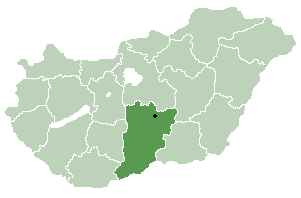
Location of Bács-Kiskun county in Hungary

Nagybaracska (Croatian: Baračka) is a village and municipality in Bács-Kiskun county, in the Southern Great Plain region of southern Hungary.

== Geography ==
It covers an area of 37.95 km^{2} (15 sq mi) and has a population of 2289 people (2015).

== Demographics ==
- (Hungary) Magyars
- (Croatia) Croats
