= Karavukovo =

Karavukovo Каравуково (Serbian)
- Village (Selo)
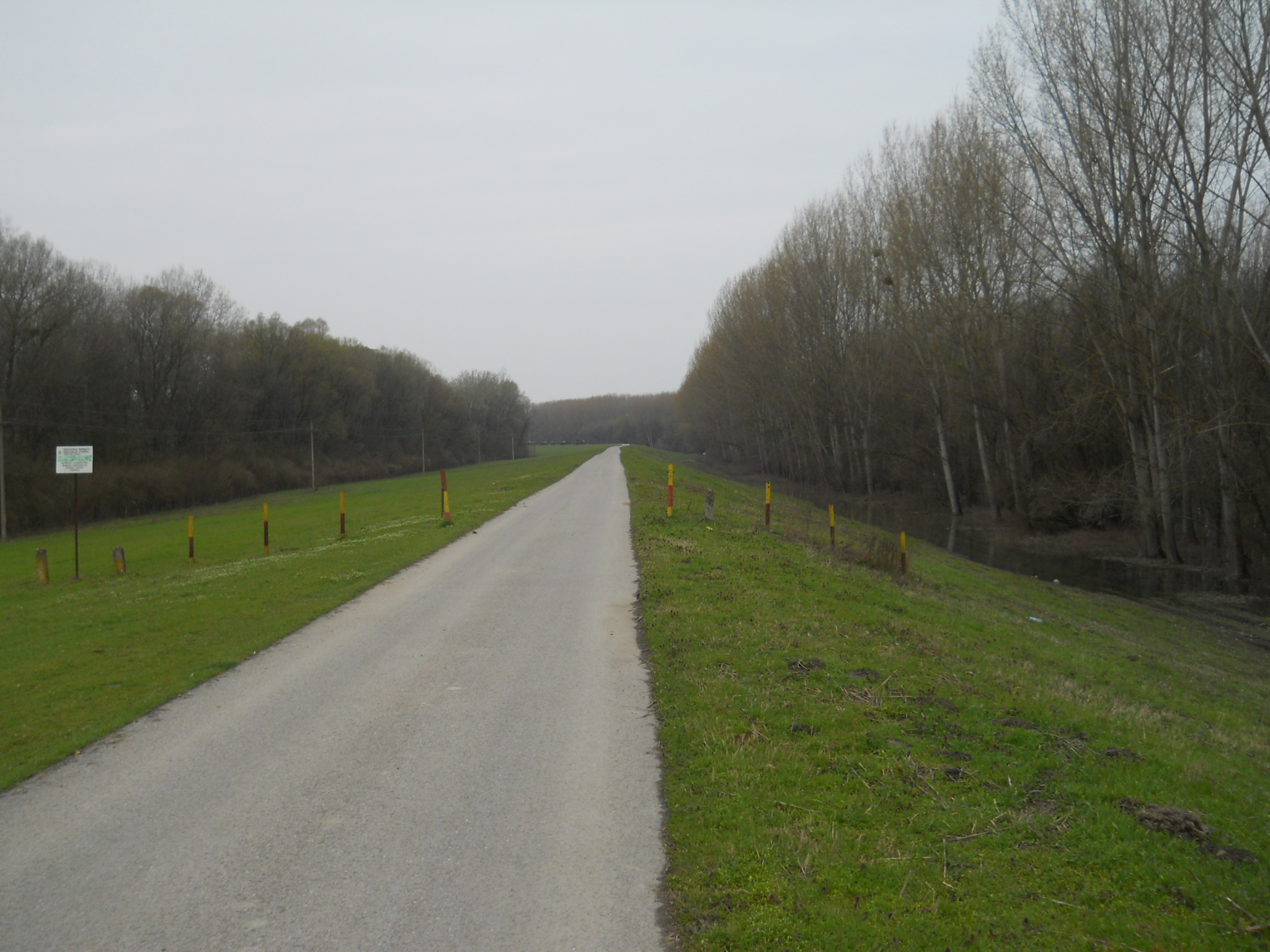

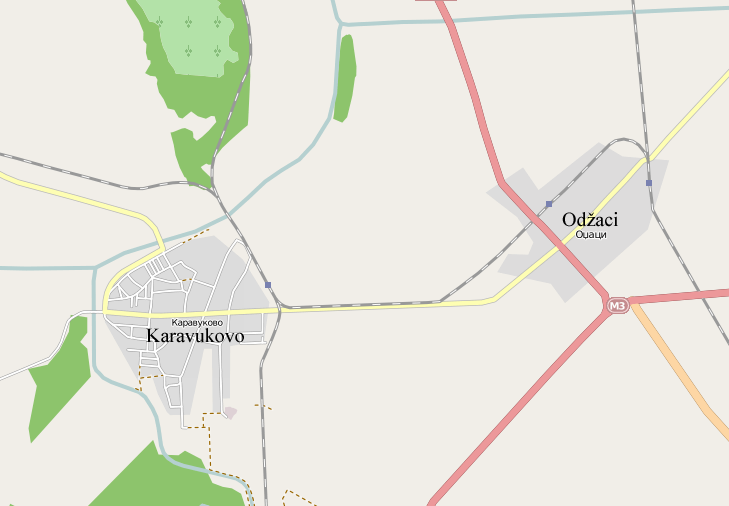
- Map of Karavukovo

- Location within Vojvodina Location within Serbia Location within Europe
- Coordinates: 45°30′N 19°11′E
- Country: Serbia
- Province: Vojvodina
- Region: Bačka
- District: West Bačka
- Municipality: Odžaci

Population (2022)
  - Total: 3,586
- Time zone: UTC+1 (CET)
  - Summer (DST): UTC+2 (CEST)

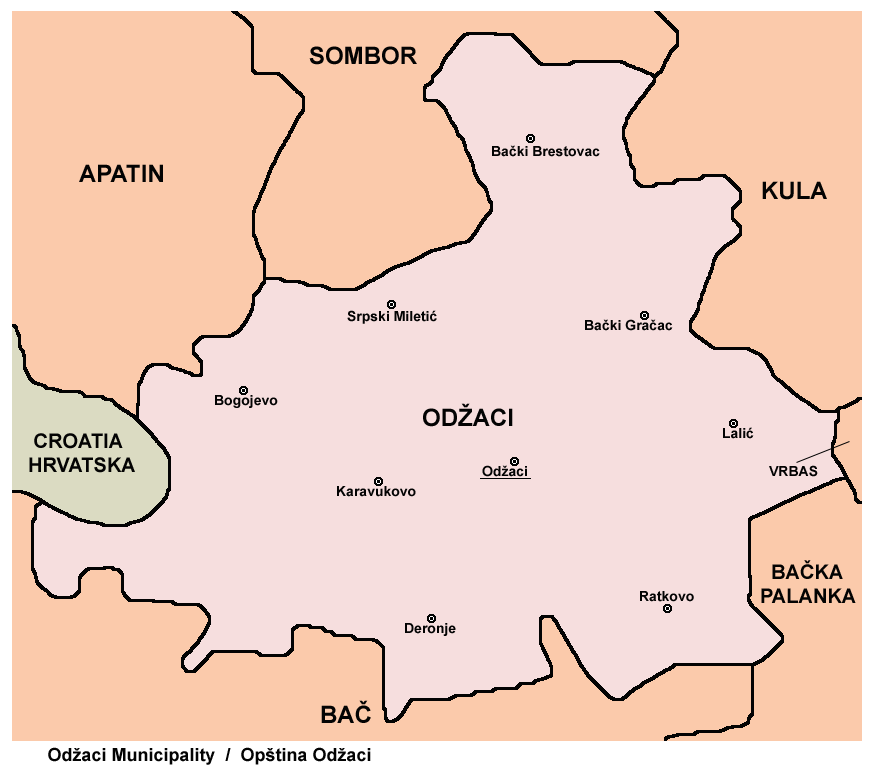
Map of Odžaci municipality, showing location of the village

Karavukovo (Serbian Cyrillic: Каравуково; Hungarian: Bácsordas; German: Wolfingen) is a village in Serbia. It is situated in the Odžaci municipality, in the West Bačka District, Vojvodina province. The village has a Serb ethnic majority and its population numbering 3,586 people (2022 census).

== Name ==
"Kara" mean's black, "Vuk" mean's wolf, thus the name means "the place of the black wolf" in Serbian.

In Hungarian it's known as Bácsordas and in German as Wolfingen.

== Historical population ==
- 1961: 6,472
- 1971: 5,925
- 1981: 5,682
- 1991: 5,607
- 2002: 4,991
- 2011: 4,215

== Notable people ==
- Radoslav Samardžić, footballer

== See also ==
- List of places in Serbia
- List of cities, towns and villages in Vojvodina

== Gallery ==
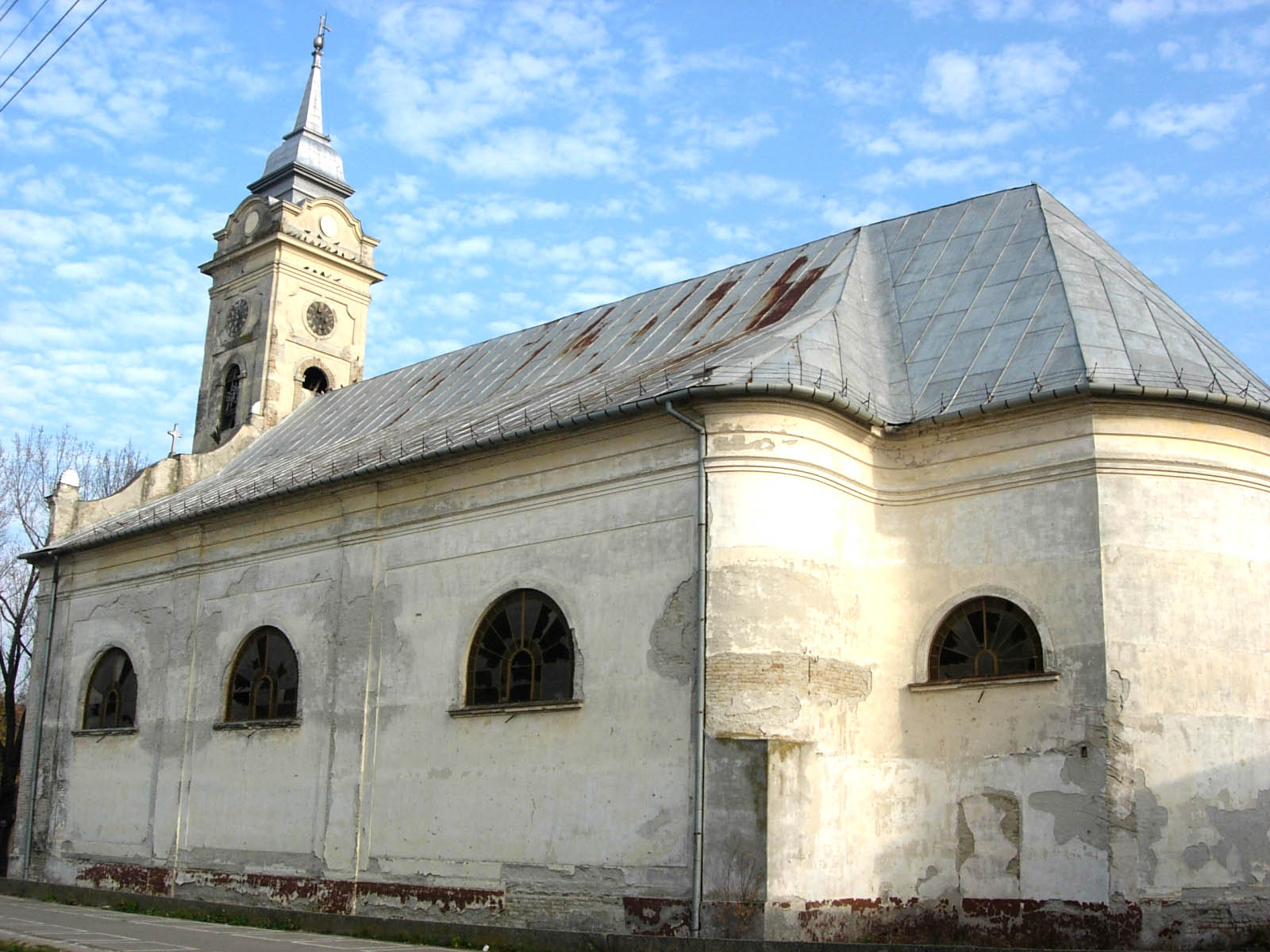
Saint Martin the Bishop Catholic Church
