= Csátalja =

Village in Hungary

Csátalja Tschatali
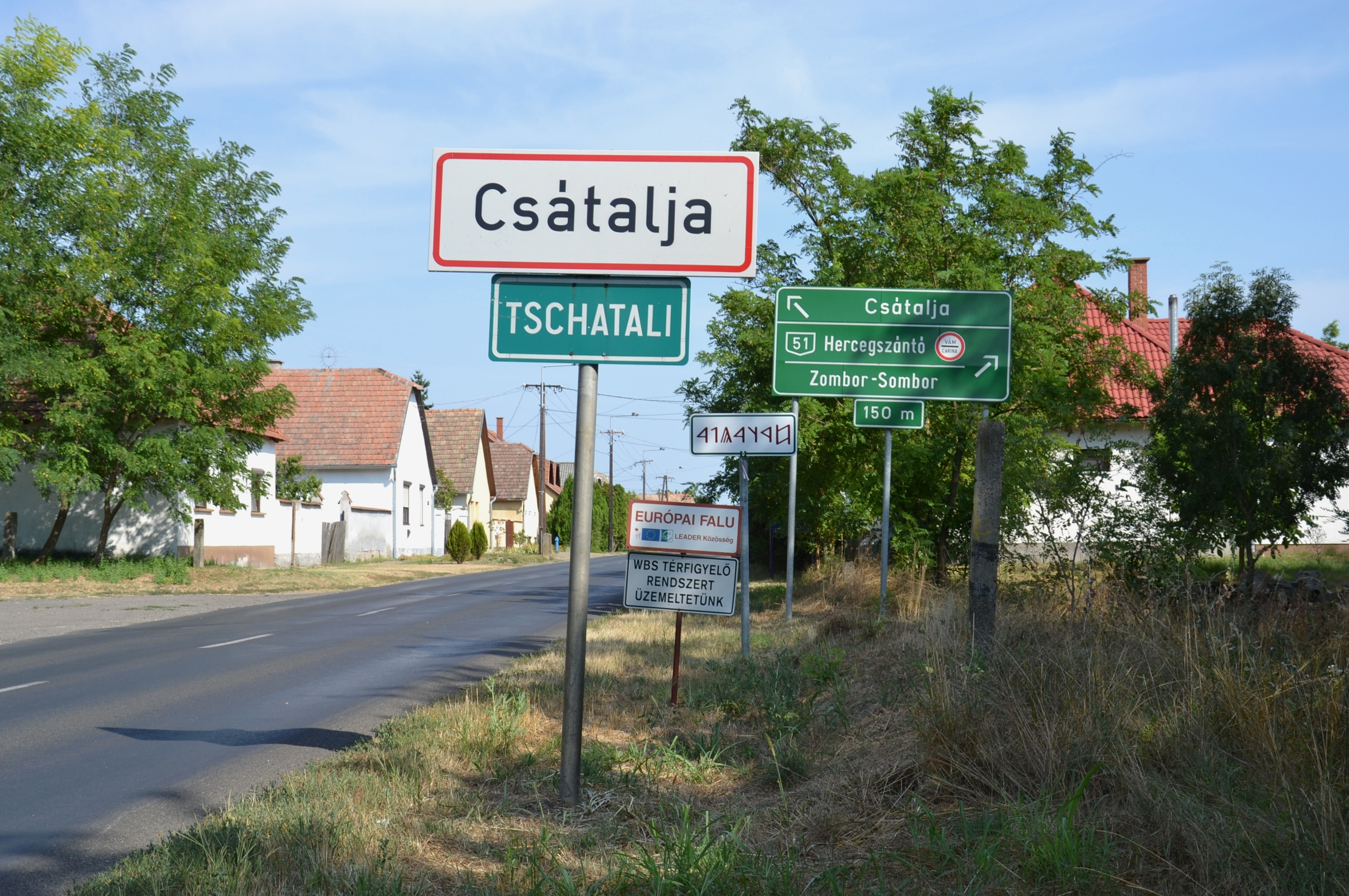
- Hungarian-German city limit sign

- Flag Coat of arms

- Location of Csátalja Csátalja; Tschatali (Hungary) Csátalja; Tschatali (Europe)
- Coordinates: 46°02′N 18°57′E
- Country: Hungary
- County: Bács-Kiskun
- District: Baja

Area
  - Total: 81.8 km^{2} (31.6 sq mi)

Population (2015)
  - Total: 1,437
  - Density: 36.8/km^{2} (95/sq mi)
- Time zone: UTC+1 (CET)
  - Summer (DST): UTC+2 (CEST)
- Postal code: 6523
- Area code: 79

Csátalja (German: Tschatali, Croatian: Čatalija) is a village in Bács-Kiskun county, in the Southern Great Plain region of southern Hungary.

== Geography ==
It covers an area of 81.8 km^{2} (32 sq mi) and had a population of 1437 people as of 2015.
