= Riđica =

Riđica Риђица (Serbian) Regőce (Hungarian)
- Village (Selo)
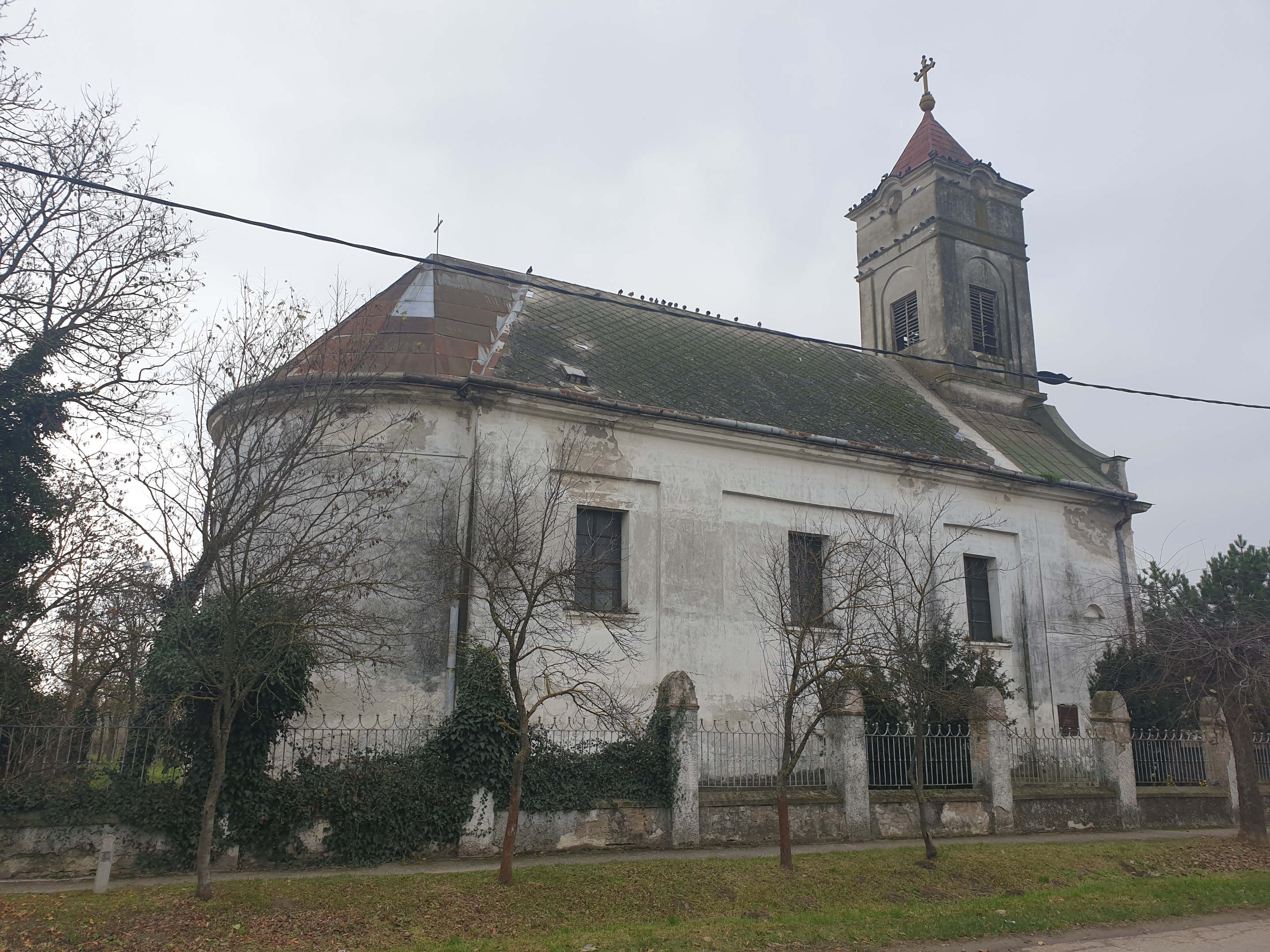
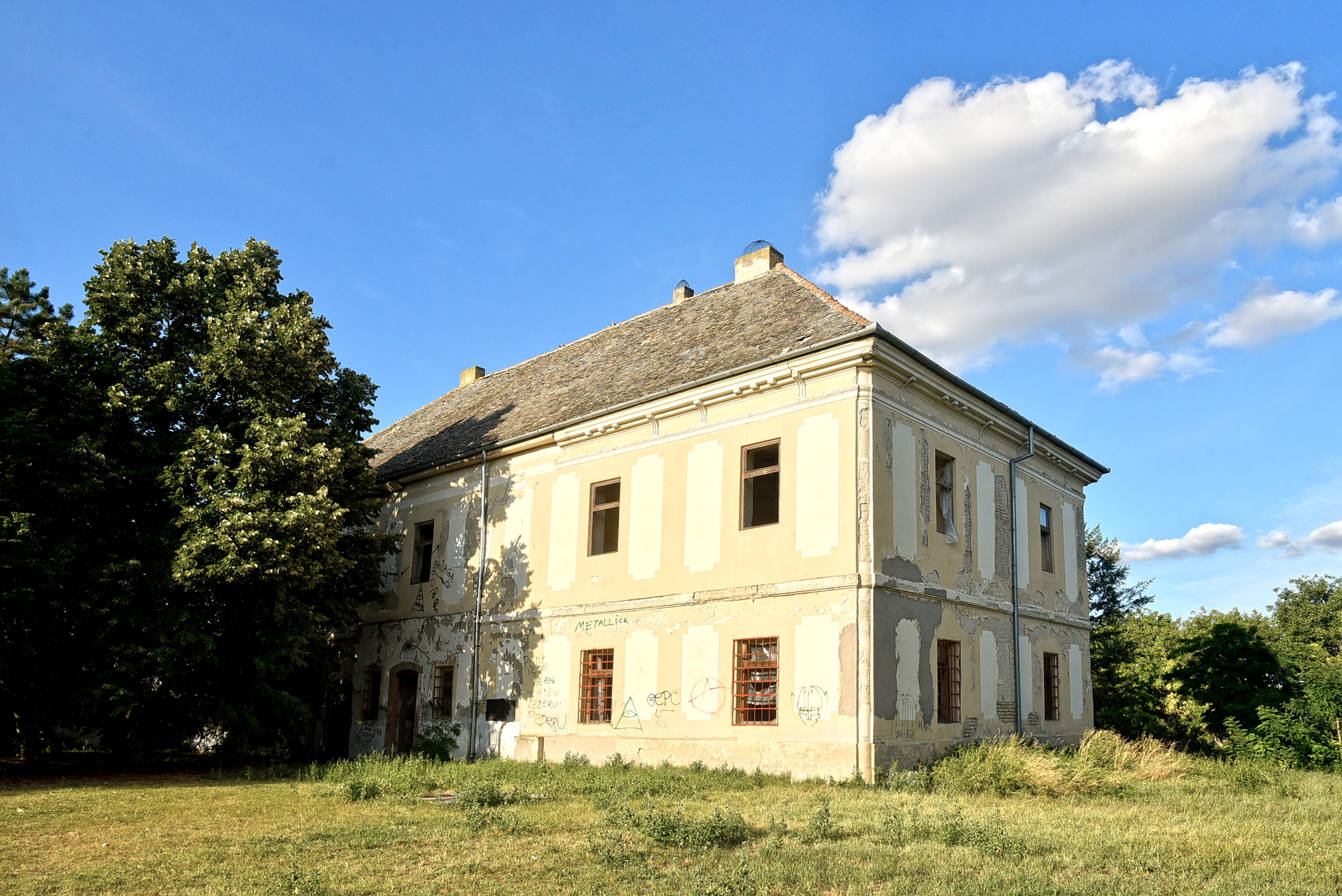
- Serbian Orthodox Church Castle of the Kovač family The Orthodox church

- Location within Vojvodina Location within Serbia Location within Europe
- Coordinates: 45°59′N 19°06′E
- Country: Serbia
- Province: Vojvodina
- Region: Bačka
- District: West Bačka
- Municipality: Sombor

Population (2002)
  - Total: 2,590
- Time zone: UTC+1 (CET)
  - Summer (DST): UTC+2 (CEST)

Riđica (Serbian Cyrillic: Риђица) is a village in Serbia. It is situated in the Sombor municipality, in the West Bačka District, Vojvodina province. The village has a Serb ethnic majority and its population numbers 2,590 people (2002 census).

== Geography ==
Riđica is the northernmost settlement of the Sombor municipality; it is 2 km away from the border with Hungary. The closest neighbouring settlements are Stanišić, Kruševlje and Rastina.

== History ==
There are remains of the Celtic fort in this area. The earliest historical record of the village dates from 1535, which mentions it as a possession of Katarina Orlović. During the Ottoman rule (16th-17th century), Riđica was populated by Serbs. During Habsburg rule, Hungarians, Slovaks and Germans settled here as well. While Slovaks were mostly magyarized, Germans left from the village after the Second World War as a consequence of war events. As part of the post-World War II colonization.

== Ethnic groups (2002 census) ==
- Serbs = 2,165 (83.59%)
- Hungarians = 217 (8.38%)
- Yugoslavs = 83 (3.21%)
- Croats = 63 (2.43%)
- Others.

== Historical population ==
- 1961: 4,291
- 1971: 3,663
- 1981: 3,186
- 1991: 2,806
- 2002: 2,590

== Sport ==
There are volleyball club "Dalmatinac" and football club "Graničar" in the village.

== See also ==
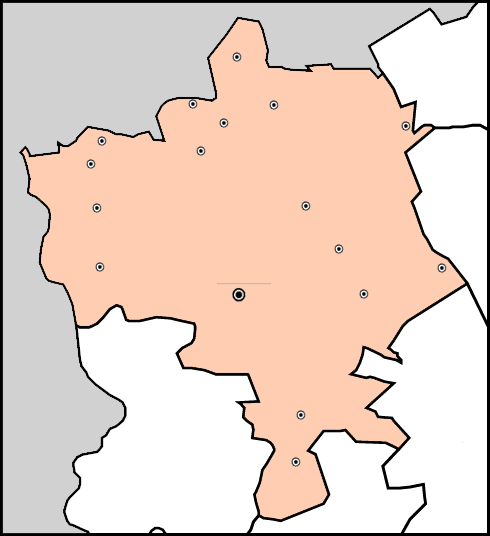
- List of places in Serbia
- List of cities, towns and villages in Vojvodina

== Gallery ==
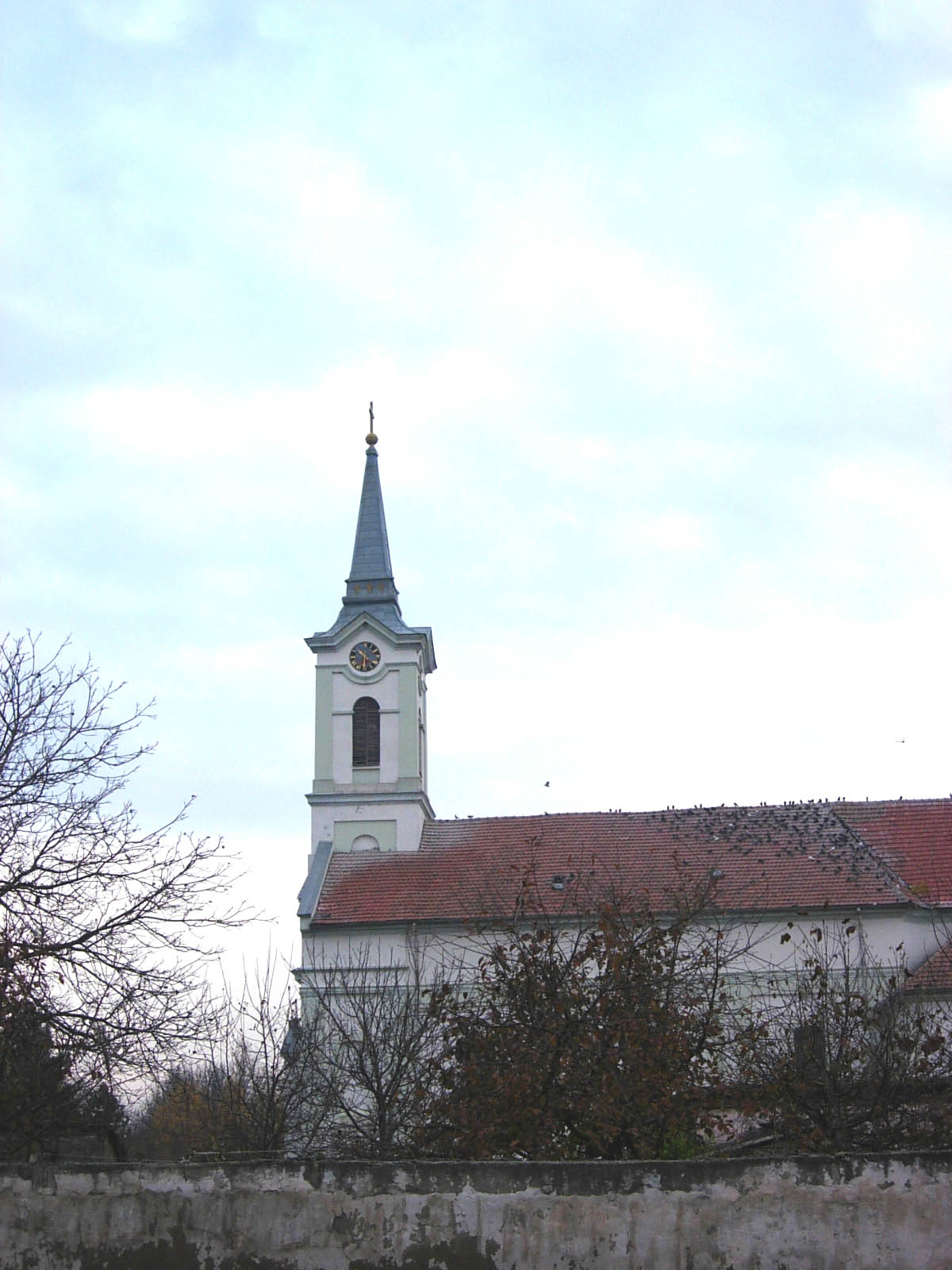
The Assumption of Our Lord Jesus Christ Catholic Church
