= Kolut =

Kolut Колут (Serbian)
- Village (Selo)
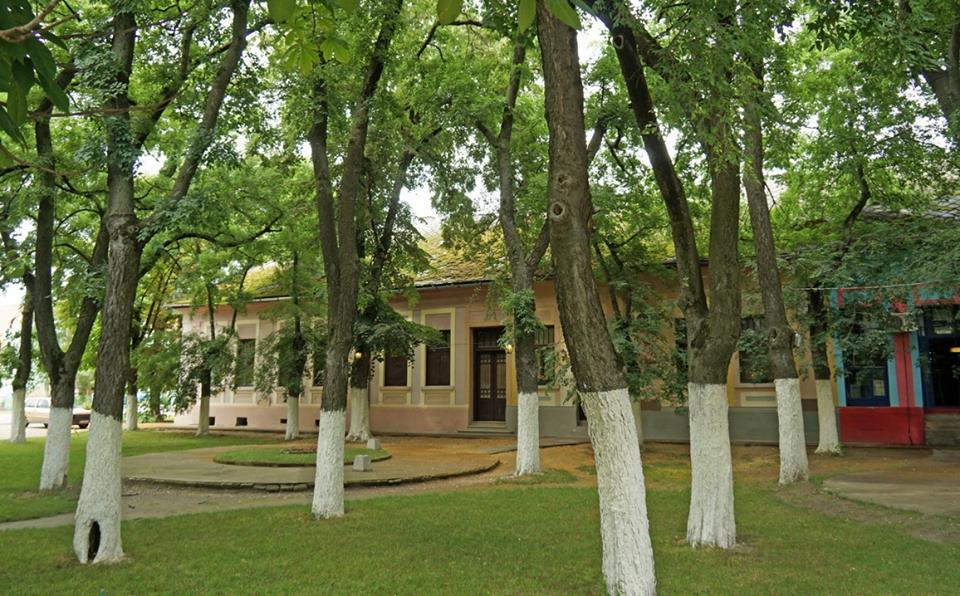
- village center

- Location within Vojvodina Location within Serbia Location within Europe
- Coordinates: 45°54′N 18°56′E
- Country: Serbia
- Province: Vojvodina
- Region: Bačka (Podunavlje)
- District: West Bačka
- Municipality: Sombor

Population (2022)
  - Total: 1,037
- Time zone: UTC+1 (CET)
  - Summer (DST): UTC+2 (CEST)

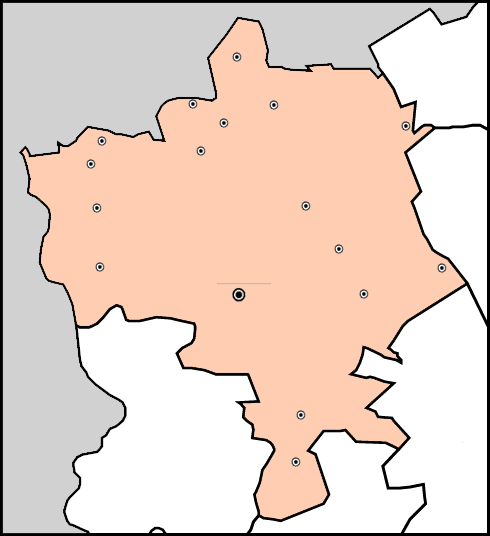

Kolut (Serbian Cyrillic: Колут) is a village in Serbia. It is situated in the Sombor municipality, in the West Bačka District, Vojvodina province. The village has a Serb ethnic majority and its population numbering 1,037 people (2022 census).

== History ==
It was first mentioned in 1261 under name Kulod, while in 1330 it was mentioned as Kulund, and several years later as Bel-Kulund during the administration of the medieval Kingdom of Hungary. During Ottoman administration (16th-17th century), the village of Kolut was populated by ethnic Serbs. In the 18th century, Germans and Hungarians settled here as well. After World War II, the village was settled by 436 families from Lika and Gorski Kotar.

== Historical population ==
- 1961: 2,597
- 1971: 2,148
- 1981: 1,866
- 1991: 1,710
- 2002: 1,710
- 2010: 1,356
- 2022: 1,037

== Gallery ==
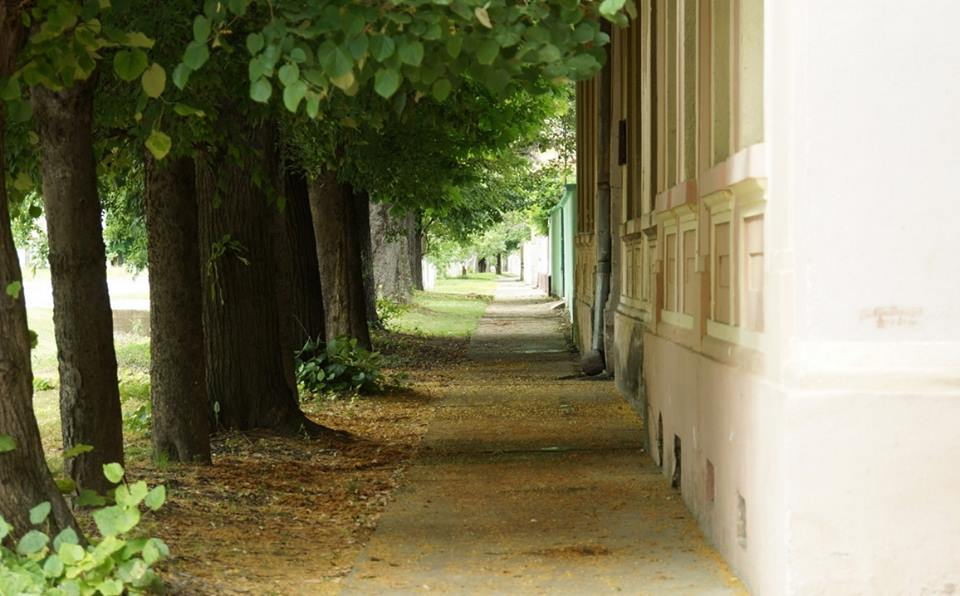

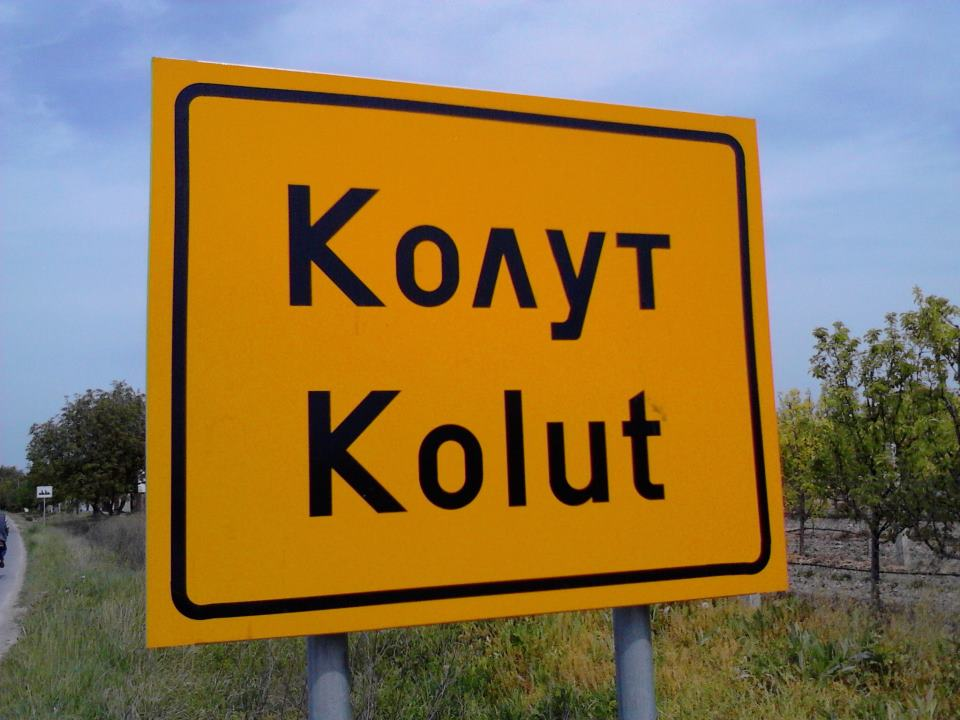

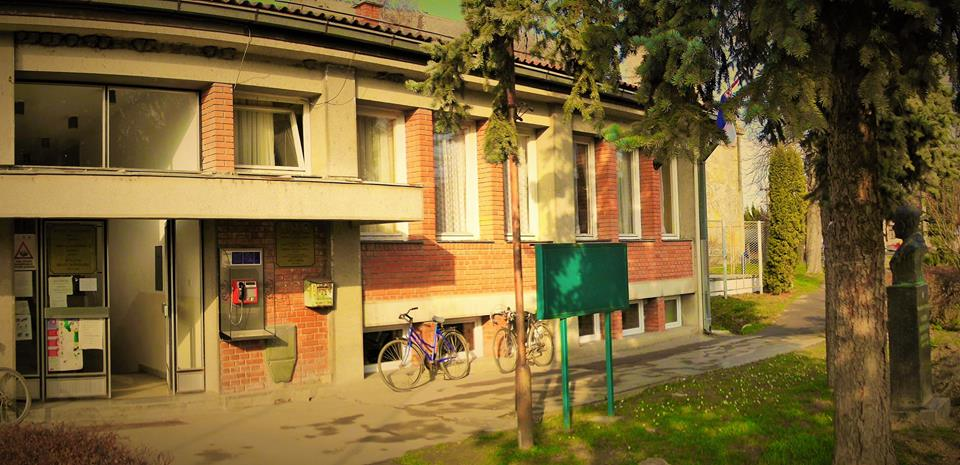

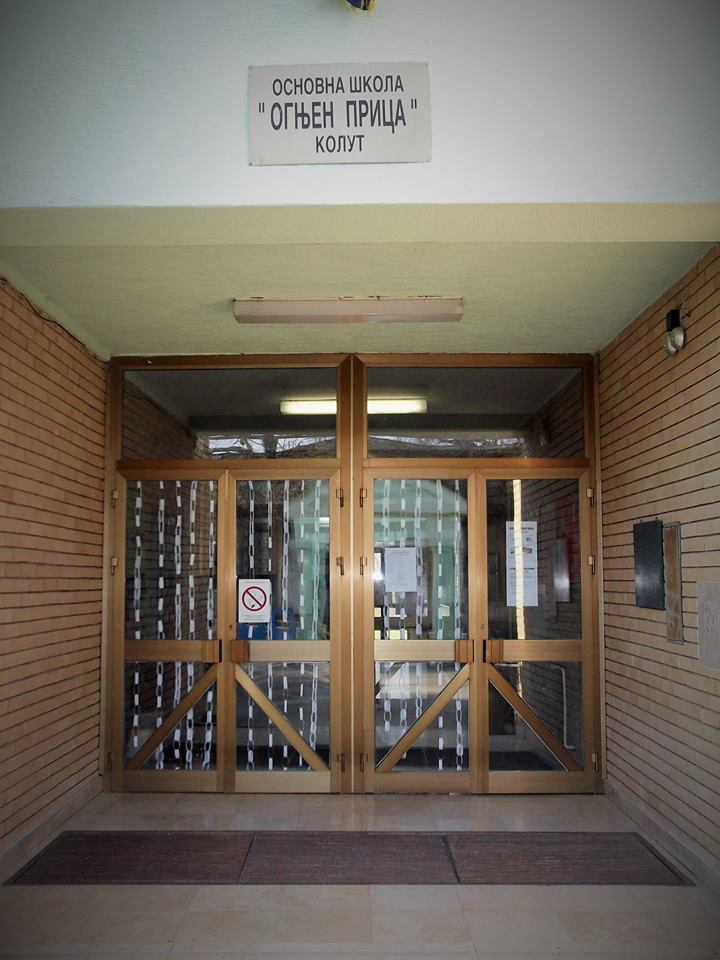

== See also ==
- List of places in Serbia
- List of cities, towns and villages in Vojvodina
