= Prigrevica =

Prigrevica Пригревица (Serbian)
- Village (Selo)
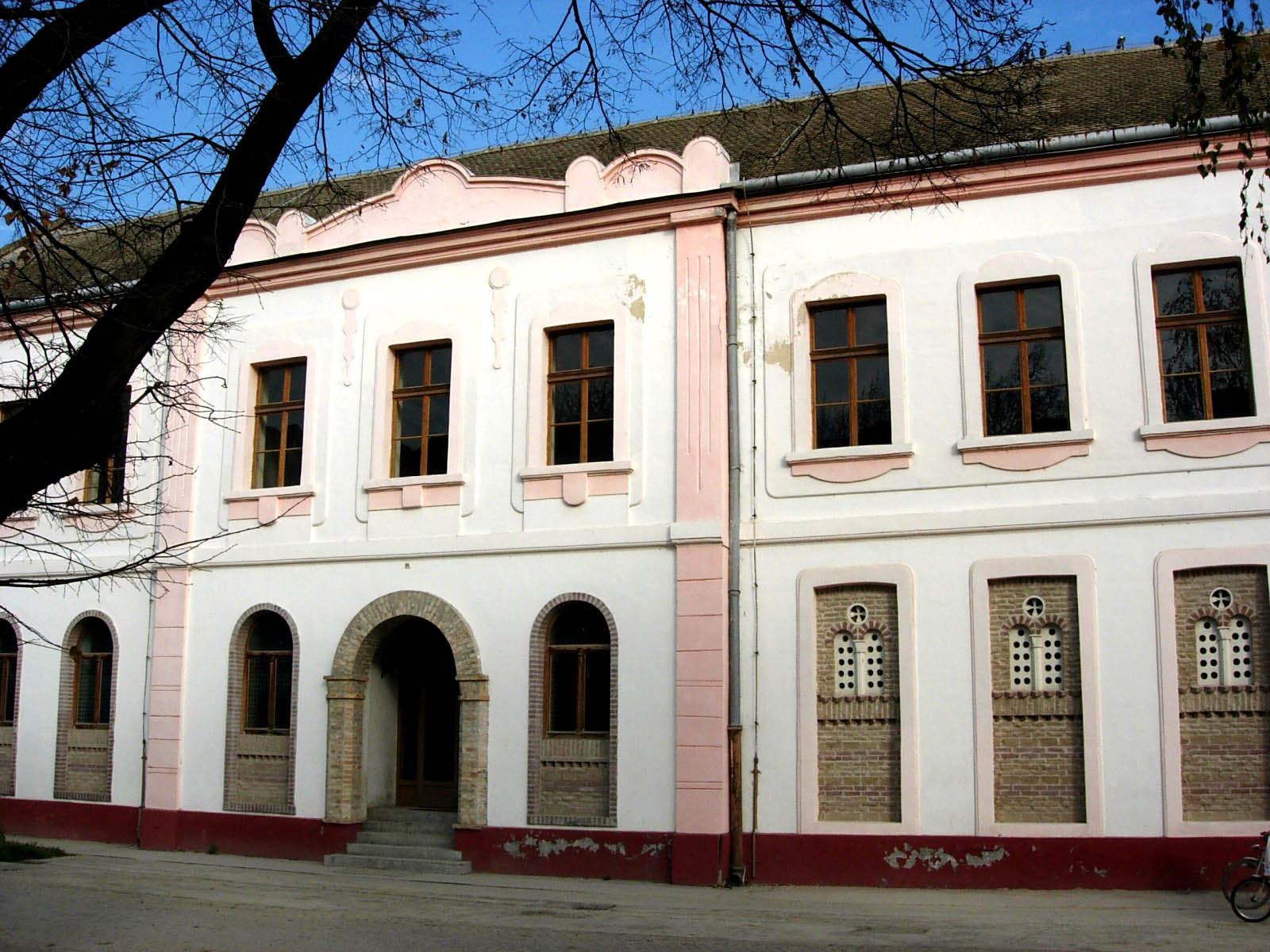
- Prigrevica Orthodox church

- Location within Vojvodina Location within Serbia Location within Europe
- Coordinates: 45°41′N 19°05′E
- Country: Serbia
- Province: Vojvodina
- Region: Bačka (Podunavlje)
- District: West Bačka
- Municipality: Apatin

Area
  - Total: 40.26 km^{2} (15.54 sq mi)

Population (2011)
  - Total: 3,964
  - Density: 98.46/km^{2} (255.0/sq mi)
- Time zone: UTC+1 (CET)
  - Summer (DST): UTC+2 (CEST)

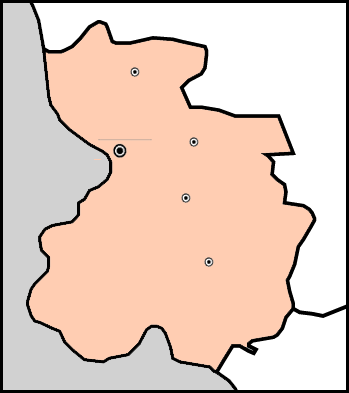

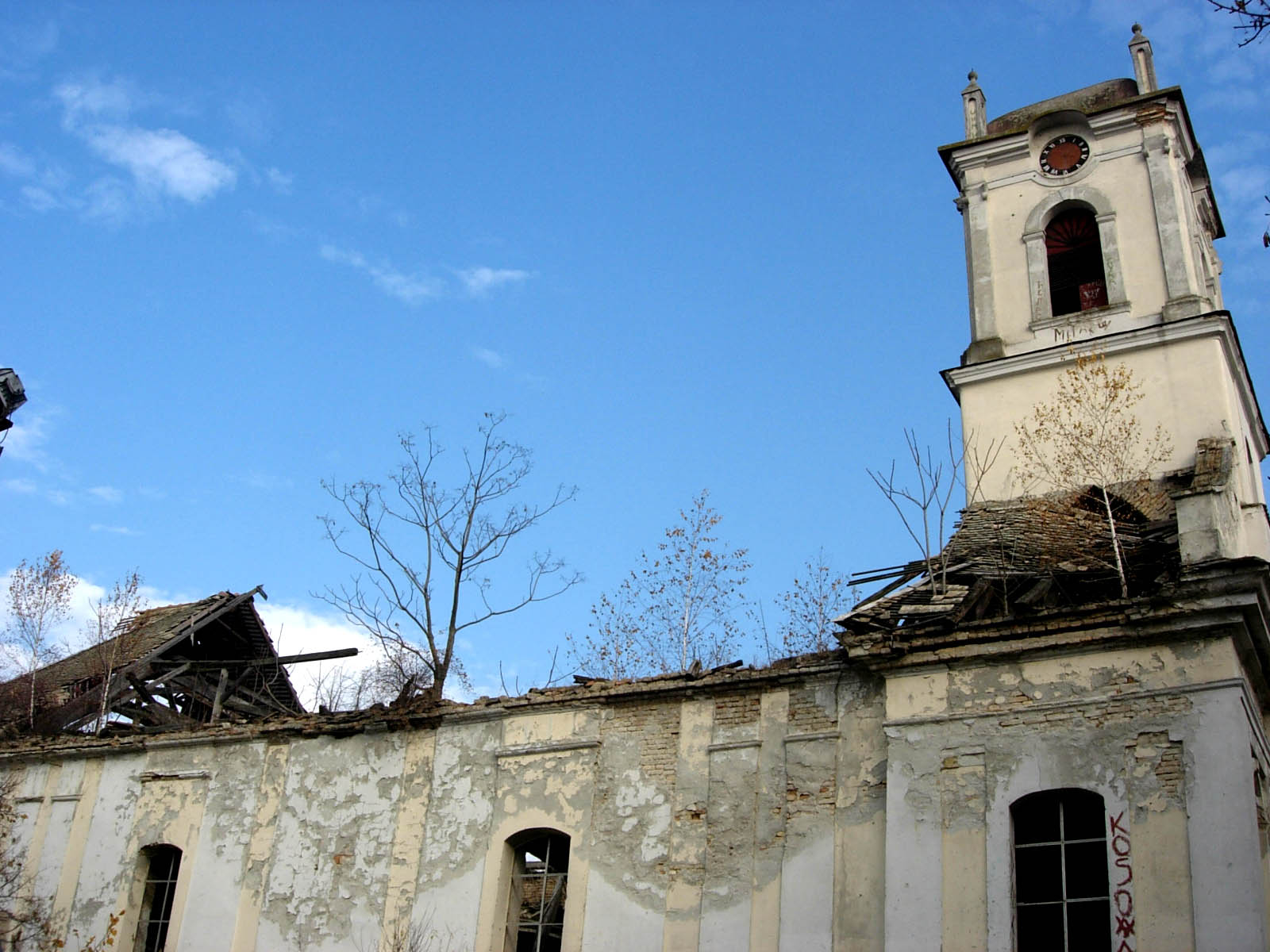
Saint John the Baptist Catholic Church, devastaded by fire and blown up with explosives in 1991

Prigrevica (Serbian Cyrillic: Пригревица) is a village located in the Apatin municipality, in the West Bačka District of Serbia. It is situated in the Autonomous Province of Vojvodina. The village is located 9 km east from Apatin. Population of Prigrevica counts about 3,964 people (2011 census), mostly ethnic Serbs.

== Name ==
The village was founded about 600 years ago and it was recorded as Zenthyvan. In German it is known as Batschsentiwan or Sankt Johann an der Schanze (1763). Saint John the Baptist is considered the patron of the village. Its Serbian names were Sentivanprogrevica (recorded in 1772), and Prigrevica Sveti Ivan (recorded in 1893). In 1947, the name was changed to shorter form Prigrevica.

== History ==
In the end of the 17th century the village became part of the Habsburg Monarchy. During the massive migration led by Arsenije Čarnojević in 1690 many Serbs came to Apatin, Sombor, and Prigrevica. A new wave of colonisation occurred in 1748 when many German colonists settled in Prigrevica. The colonists came from many different regions in southern Germany and East France. The gathering centre was in Ulm, Germany and from that point they were transported by the Danube to Apatin, which became the main base of the German expansion in Vojvodina.

When the Yugoslav Partisans came on October 24, 1944, they liberated Prigrevica from Axis occupation. AVNOJ declared its mainly German population as public enemies. Also in Prigrevica the German civil population became victim of excessive revenge of the partisans. They were partially shot, tortured to death or sent to one of several concentration camps that existed until 1948.

After the Second World War, Prigrevica was settled by colonists who mostly originated from Lika and Banija.

== Ethnic groups (2002 census) ==
- Serbs = 4,569 (95.57%)
- Croats = 50 (1.05%)
- Yugoslavs = 29 (0.61%)
- Hungarians = 21 (0.44%)
- Others.

== Historical population ==
- 1900: 5,054 inhabitants, 4,812 Germans, 195 Hungarians, 47 others
- 1948: 5,219 inhabitants, 89.3% Serbs and 7.4% Yugoslavs
- 1953: 5,480
- 1961: 5,449
- 1971: 5,033
- 1981: 5,026
- 1991: 4,842
- 2002: 4,781
- 2011: 3,964

== Culture ==
Cultural-artistic society "KUD Prigrevica" was founded in 1996 and it has about 100 members who are active in different sections of the society.

== Famous people ==
- Željko Rebrača, a professional basketball player in the NBA. He was born in Prigrevica in 1972.

== See also ==
- List of places in Serbia
- List of cities, towns and villages in Vojvodina

== Literature ==
- Slobodan Ćurčić, Broj stanovnika Vojvodine, Novi Sad, 1996.
