= Gakovo =

Gakovo Гаково (Serbian)
- Village (Selo)
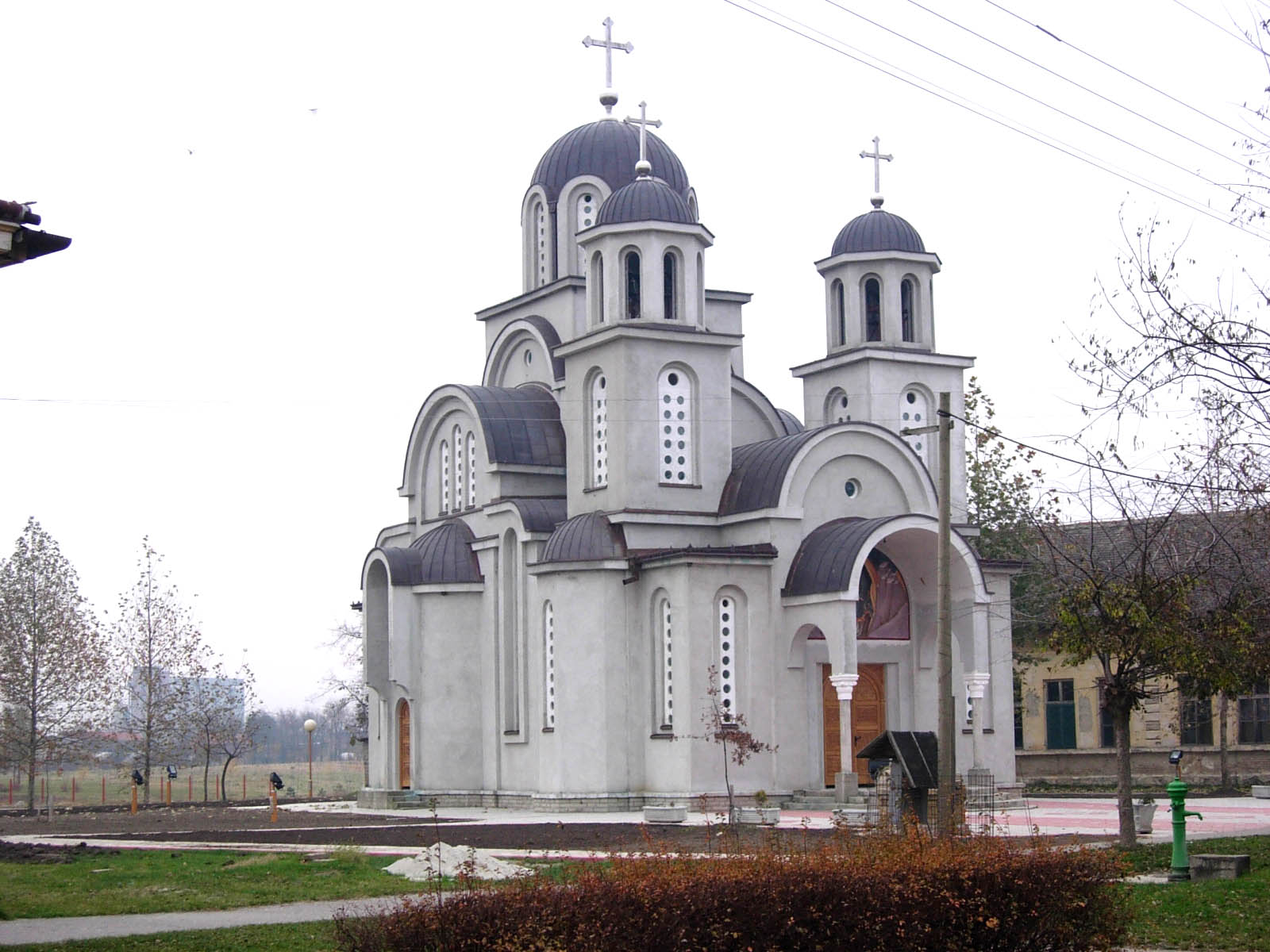
- The new Orthodox church in the village. The razed Catholic church stood here until the end of the 1960s.

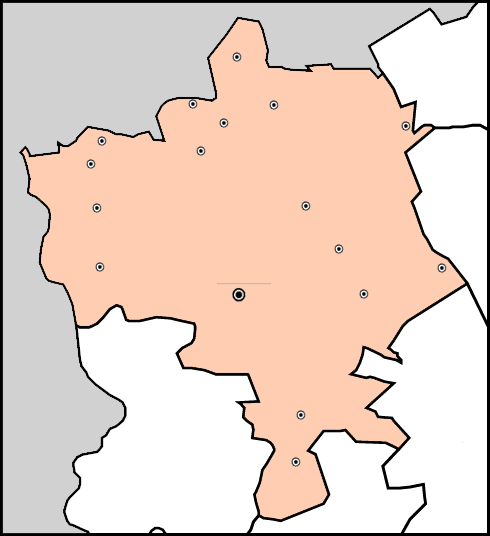

- Location within Vojvodina Location within Serbia Location within Europe
- Coordinates: 45°54′12″N 19°03′49″E
- Country: Serbia
- Province: Vojvodina
- Region: Bačka
- District: West Bačka
- Municipality: Sombor

Population (2002)
  - Total: 2,201
- Postal code: 25 282

Gakovo (Serbian Cyrillic: Гаково) is a village in Serbia. It is situated in the Sombor municipality, in the West Bačka District, Vojvodina province. The village has a Serb ethnic majority and its population is 2,201 (2002 census).

== Name ==
In Serbian, the village is known as Gakovo (Гаково), in German as Gakowa or Graumarkt, in Hungarian as Gádor or Gákova, in Croatian as Gakovo, and in Bunjevac as Gakovo. Name of the village is of Slavic (Serbo-Croatian) origin and roughly means "the place of Gako" or "the place of Gak".

== Geography ==
Gakovo is located in north-western Bačka near the border with Hungary between the Tisa and Danube rivers. A small neighbouring settlement known as Kruševlje is also officially regarded as part of Gakovo. Gakovo lies at an altitude of 96 meters.

== History ==
From 1658 name Gakovo was used for an uninhabited area that was under Ottoman administration. Village of Gakovo was formed during Habsburg administration in the first half of the 18th century. According to the sources, this village existed in 1728 and was populated by "Šijaks" (Serbs from Croatia).

In 1748, some Austro-Hungarians (Danube Swabians) from Apatin and Kruševlje settled here as well and it was one of the first settlements in Bačka that was colonized by Austro-Hungarians. Another wave of Danube Swabian colonists came between 1763 and 1768. Some colonists were from the upper Danube region, Baden-Württemberg (Swabian), and Alsace-Lorraine (Alsatian), but some were from other areas of the Habsburg monarchy such as Bohemia, Slovakia, Hungary, etc.

In 1787, population of Gakovo numbered 1,522 inhabitants. Until 1848, the village was part of the Batsch-Bodrog County within the Habsburg Kingdom of Hungary. In 1848–49, the village was part of autonomous Serbian Vojvodina and from 1849 to 1860 it was part of the Voivodeship of Serbia and Banat of Temeschwar, which was a separate Habsburg crownland. After abolishment of the voivodeship, in 1860, Gakovo was again included into Batsch-Bodrog County. In 1910, population of the village numbered 2,770 inhabitants, mostly Danube Swabians. Some village residents emigrated to the United States, Canada and Argentina beginning in the early 1900s, before the World War I. A second emigration wave set out from 1925 to 1930.

In 1918, the village became part of the Kingdom of Serbs, Croats and Slovenes (later renamed to Yugoslavia). From 1918 to 1922, the village was part of the Novi Sad County, from 1922 to 1929 part of Bačka Oblast, and from 1929 to 1941 part of Danube Banovina. From 1941 to 1944, the village was under Axis occupation and was officially part of Hungary.

=== World War II ===
In 1944, Soviet Red Army and Yugoslav partisans expelled Axis forces from the region and village was included into new socialist Yugoslavia. For many reasons that historians are still uncertain and divided about, new Yugoslav authorities sent those Gakovans who remained in the country into internment camps. (Many Gakovans, however, had left the country in 1944, following the defeated German Army.)

Gakovo was one of the sites of these post-World War II internment camps for the ethnic Germans (Danube Swabians). Gakovo and the nearby village of Kruševlje had at its maximum about 30,000 detainees, of whom between 11,000 and 12,000 died as the Yugoslav authorities deliberately created starvation conditions and extreme crowding, withheld water, and beat and shot the ethnic German civilians. The local population was strictly forbidden from helping their former neighbors with food.

Internment camps were abolished in 1948 and remaining Gakovans were forced to work for two years as indentured slaves throughout Yugoslavia. In the next decades, most emigrated from the country. Memorials to the victims of the Gakovo prison camp have been erected within the town.

Since 1944, the village is part of autonomous province Vojvodina, which in 1945 was included into newly formed Socialist Republic of Serbia within new Yugoslavia. Present-day inhabitants of the village were settled here after World War II. None of the inhabitants of Gakovo prior to World War II remain in Gakovo. New settlers originated mostly from Mrkonjić Grad and Donja Pecka in Bosnia and Herzegovina.

== Historical population ==
- 1783: 1,346
- 1791: 1,292
- 1800: 1,432
- 1819: 1,744
- 1890: 2,603 (400 houses)
- 1900: 2,620 (460 houses)
- 1910: 2,770 (578 houses)
- 1921: 2,751
- 1941: 2,531
- 1948: 62
- 1953: 2,022
- 1961: 1,769
- 1971: 2,014
- 1981: 2,122
- 1991: 2,073
- 2002: 2,201

== See also ==
- List of places in Serbia
- List of cities, towns and villages in Vojvodina
