= Žarkovac (Sombor) =

Žarkovac Жарковац (Serbian)
- Hamlet
- Interactive map of Žarkovac
- Country: Serbia
- Province: Vojvodina
- Time zone: UTC+1 (CET)
  - Summer (DST): UTC+2 (CEST)

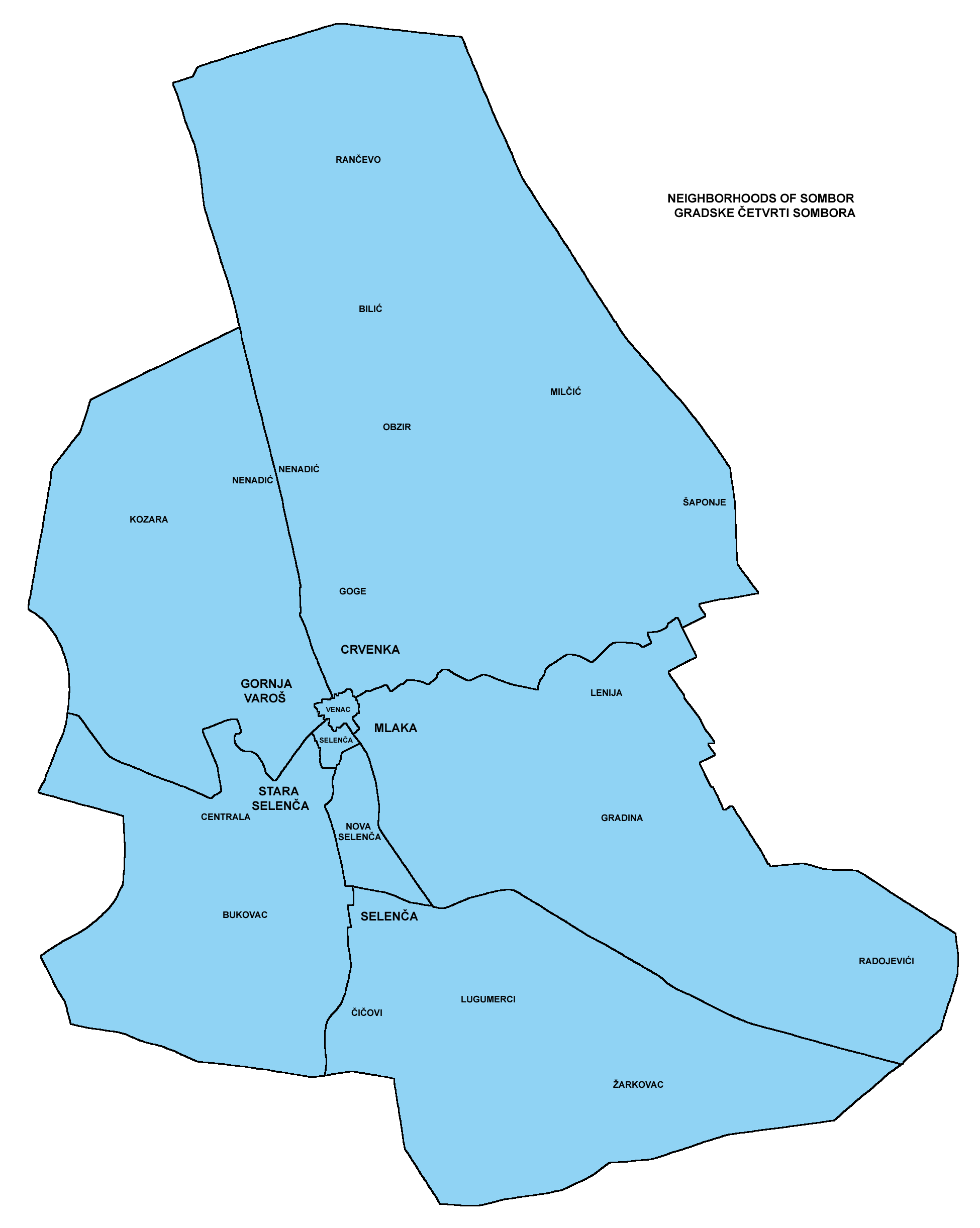
Neighborhoods of urban Sombor

Žarkovac (Serbian Cyrillic: Жарковац) is a small settlement (hamlet) in Serbia. It is situated in the Sombor municipality, West Bačka District, Vojvodina province.

== Geography ==
Officially, Žarkovac is not classified as a separate settlement, but as suburban part of the town of Sombor. It is located between Stapar and Lugumerci.

== See also ==
- Sombor
- List of places in Serbia
- List of cities, towns and villages in Vojvodina
