= Church of St. George, Sombor =

Church of St. George
- Црква светог Георгија; Crkva svetog Georgija
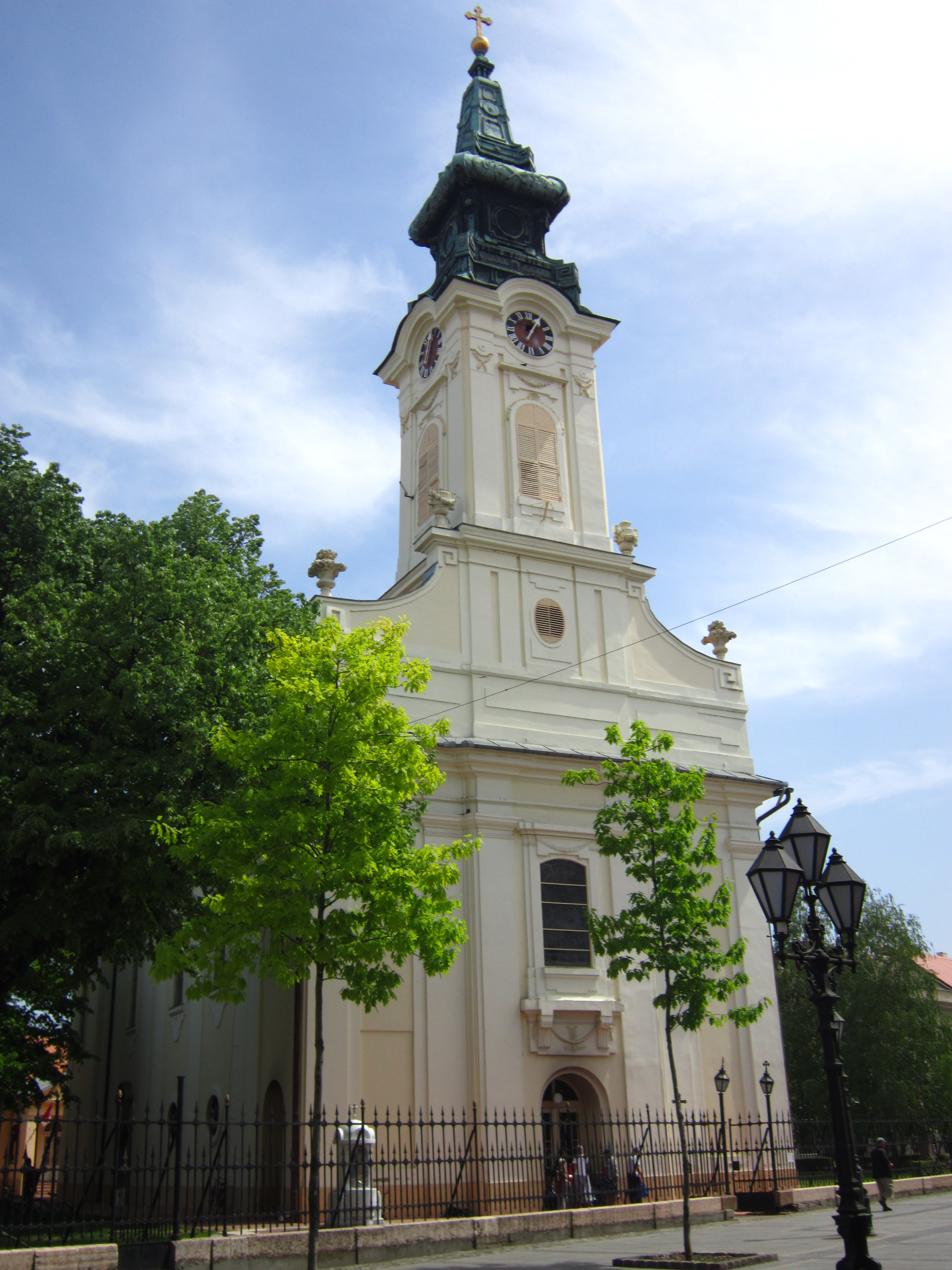
- Church of St George
- Church of St. George
- 45°46′26″N 19°06′54″E
- Location: Sombor, Vojvodina
- Country: Serbia
- Denomination: Serbian Orthodox

History
- Status: Church
- Dedication: St. George

Architecture
- Functional status: Active
- Style: Neo-classicism
- Years built: 1761

Administration
- Archdiocese: Eparchy of Bačka

The Church of St. George (Serbian: Црква светог Георгија) in Sombor is Serbian Orthodox church in Vojvodina, Serbia.

== History ==
The building is under the protection of the Republic of Serbia as a part of the Immovable Cultural Heritage of Great Importance. The Orthodox Church in Sombor, dedicated to Saint Great Martyr George, was erected on the site of an older church that was renovated during the Ottoman rule in 1717 and was known as the Small St. George's Church. After gaining the status of a free and royal city, the people of Sombor desired to have a church worthy of their new privileges. The construction of the new church began in 1759 with the contributions of the Orthodox Serbs from the city. The first liturgy in the new church was held on the feast of the Presentation in 1761, when a marble altar was placed in the sanctuary.

The iconostasis was created by woodcarver Arsenije Marković; in 1771, the painting of the icons was entrusted to Teodor Kračun, Jovan Isajlović and Lazar Serdanović. The church interior was transformed in 1866; a new iconostasis was sculpted by Joseph Kestner of Novi Sad and Karlo Ildinji of Budapest; the icons were painted by Pavle Simić, whose style is marked by the influence of Nazarene painting.

In the church are buried Count Jovan Janko Branković (c. 1675–1734), "great captain" of Sombor, and the bishop of the Bačka eparchy Jovan Jovanović, who died suddenly in 1805.

Restoration work was carried out on the paintings in 1959 and 1960 and on the architecture in 1966, 1980 and 1987.

== See also ==
- Eparchy of Bačka
