= Bilić, Serbia =

Bilić Билић (Serbian)
- Hamlet
- Location within Serbia
- Coordinates: 45°51′N 19°07′E
- Country: Serbia
- Province: Vojvodina
- Time zone: UTC+1 (CET)
  - Summer (DST): UTC+2 (CEST)

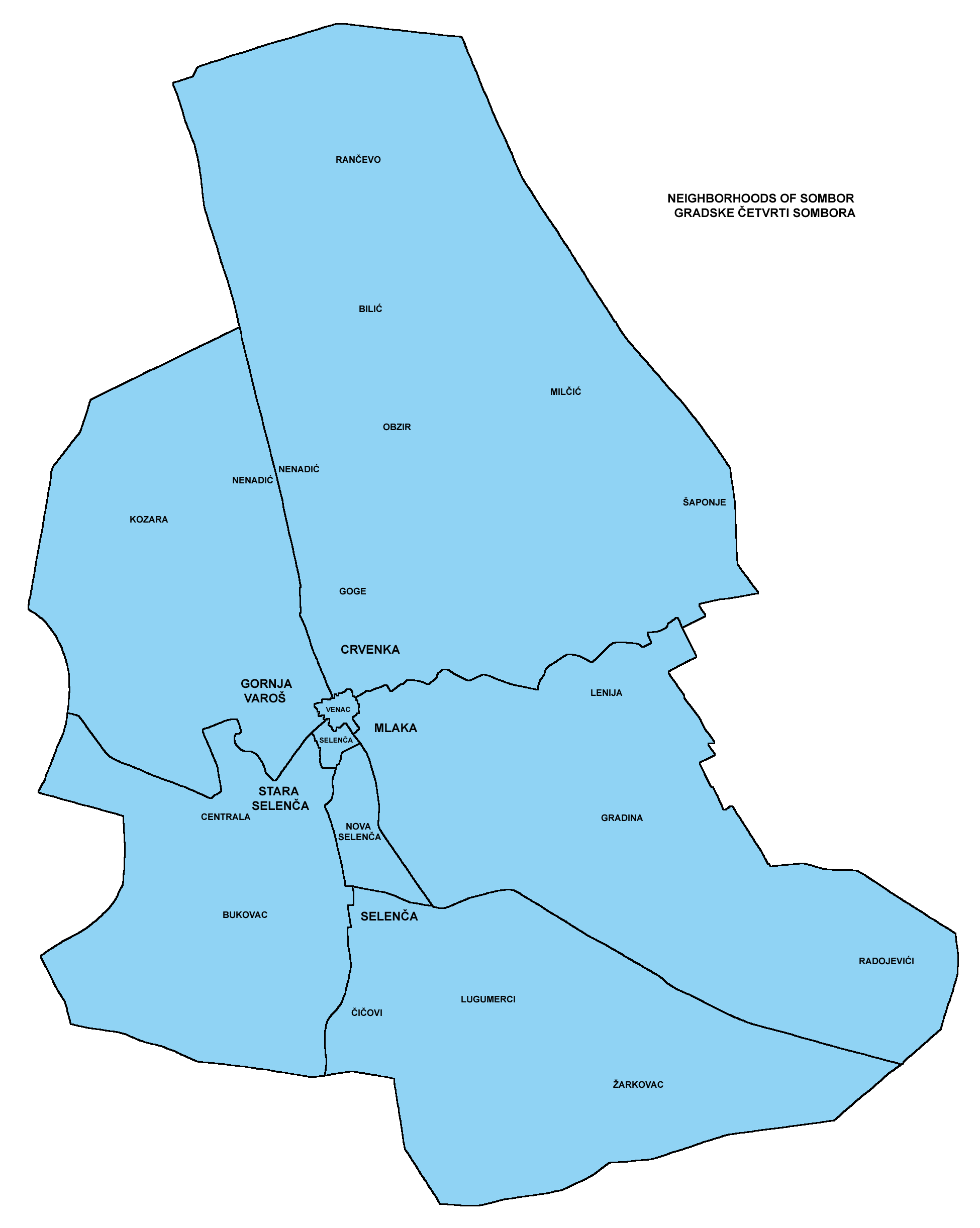
Neighborhoods of urban Sombor

Bilić (Serbian Cyrillic: Билић), also known as Bilići (Serbian Cyrillic: Билићи), is a small settlement (hamlet) in Serbia. It is situated in the Sombor municipality, West Bačka District, Vojvodina province.

== Geography ==
Officially, Bilić is not classified as a separate settlement, but as suburban part of the town of Sombor. It is located between Sombor, Svetozar Miletić, and Rančevo.

== See also ==
- Sombor
- List of places in Serbia
- List of cities, towns and villages in Vojvodina
