= Šaponje =

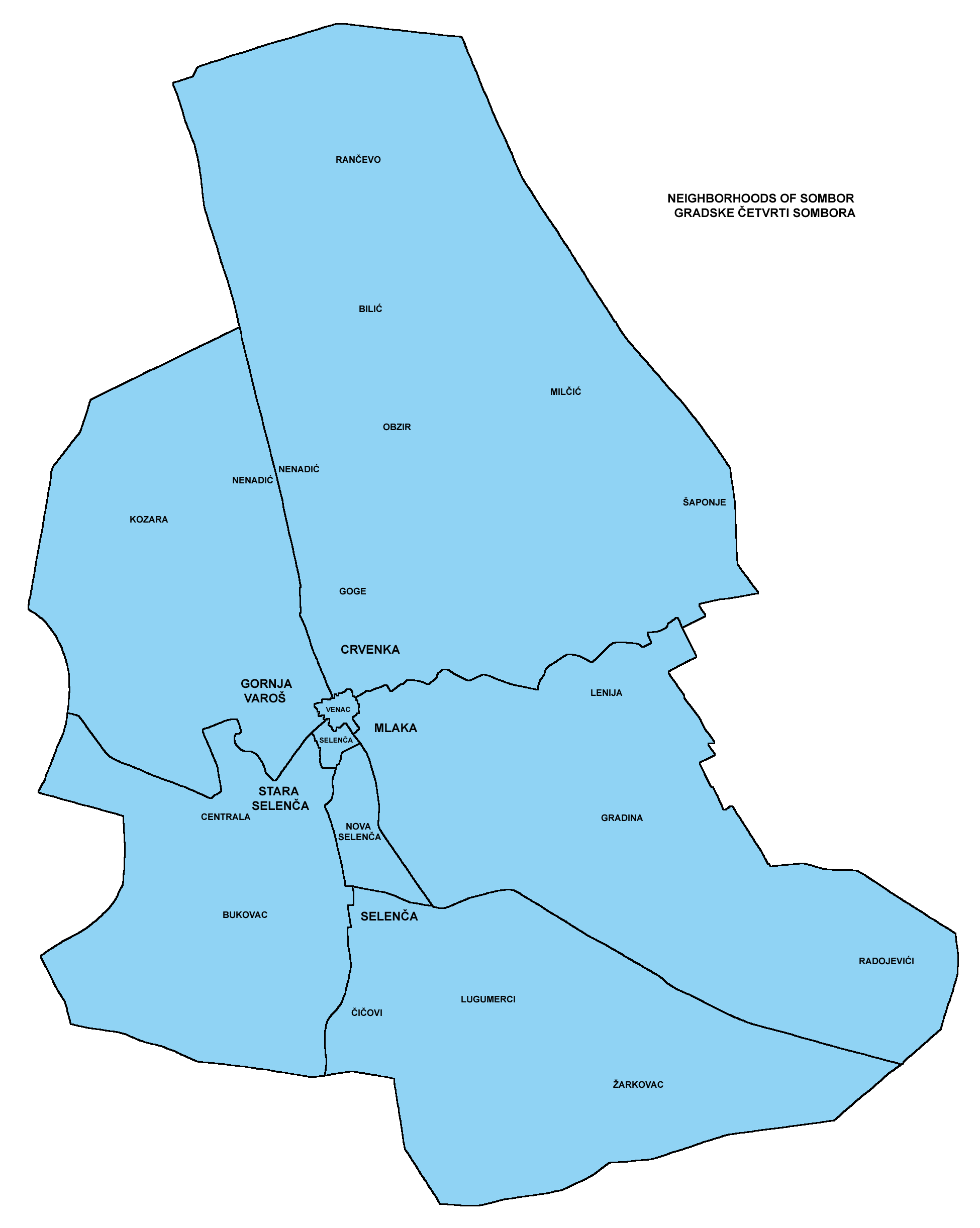
Neighborhoods of urban Sombor

Šaponje is a small farming village in the Sombor municipality of Vojvodina, Serbia. It's a locality in Montenegro and has an elevation of 1,172 metres. Šaponje is situated nearby to the localities Milovo and Vrčane.

The village was first mentioned in the 14th century.
