= Sombor =

City in the province of Vojvodina, Serbia

Sombor Сомбор (Serbian) Zombor (Hungarian)
- City
- City of Sombor
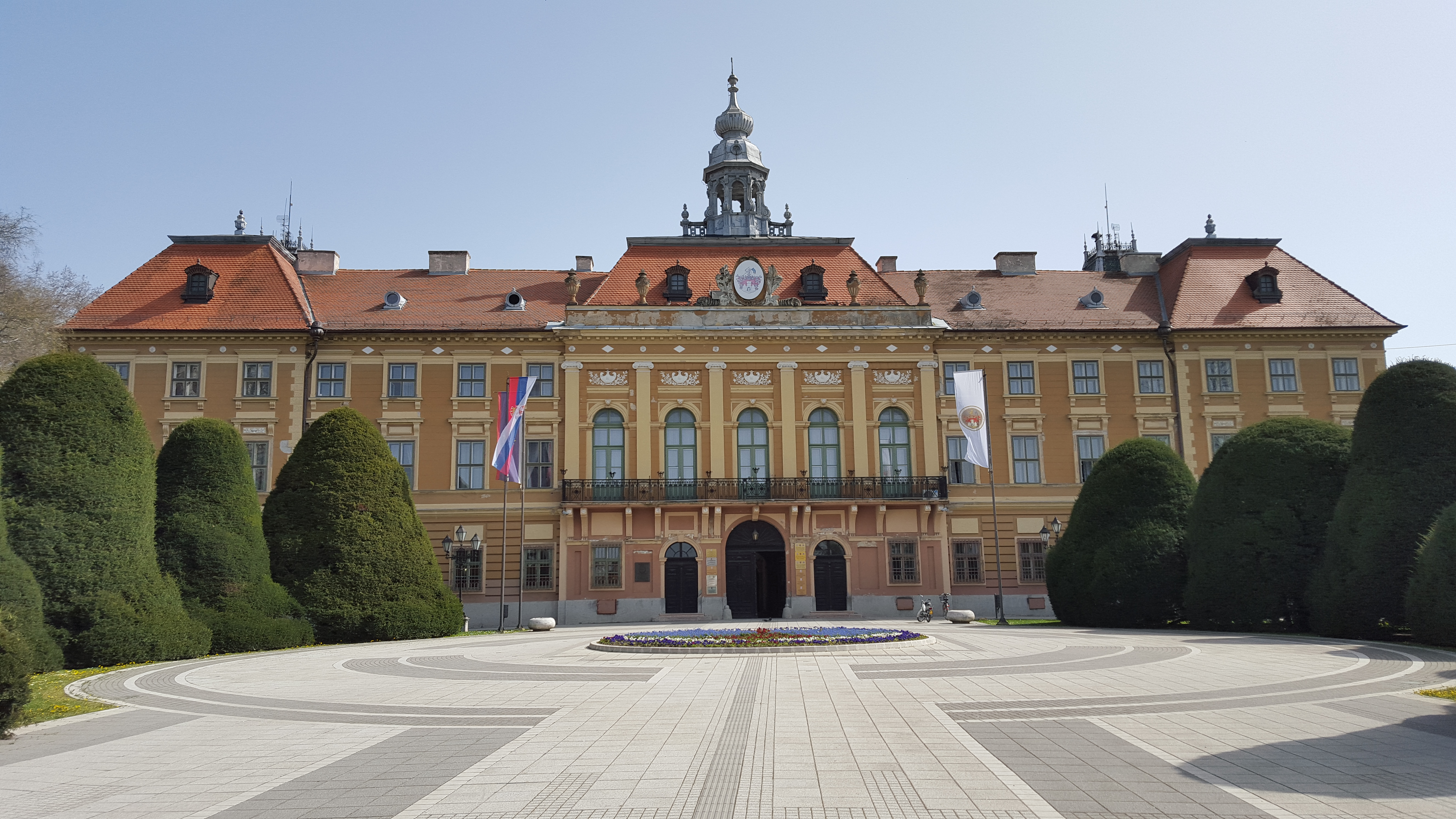
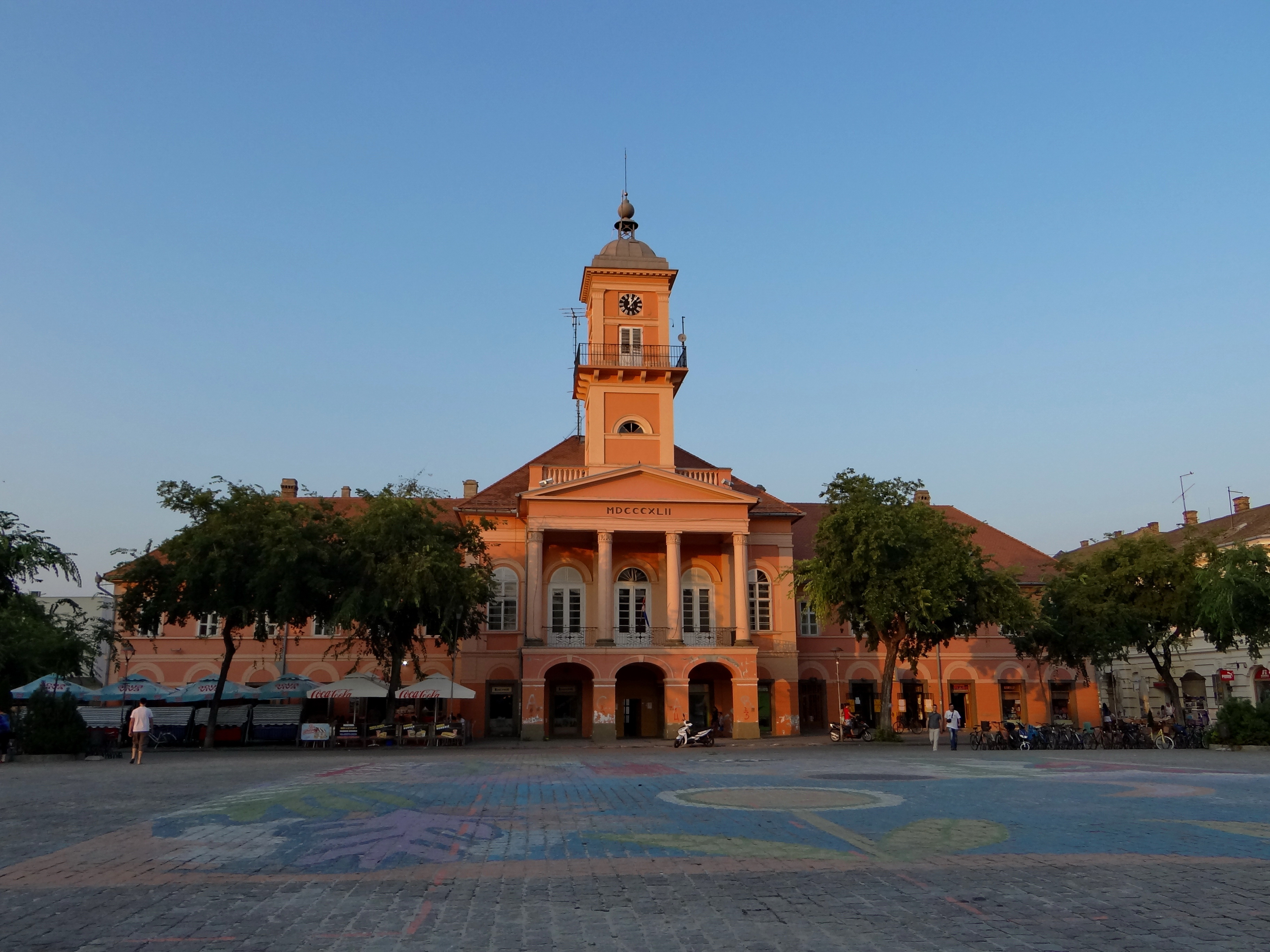
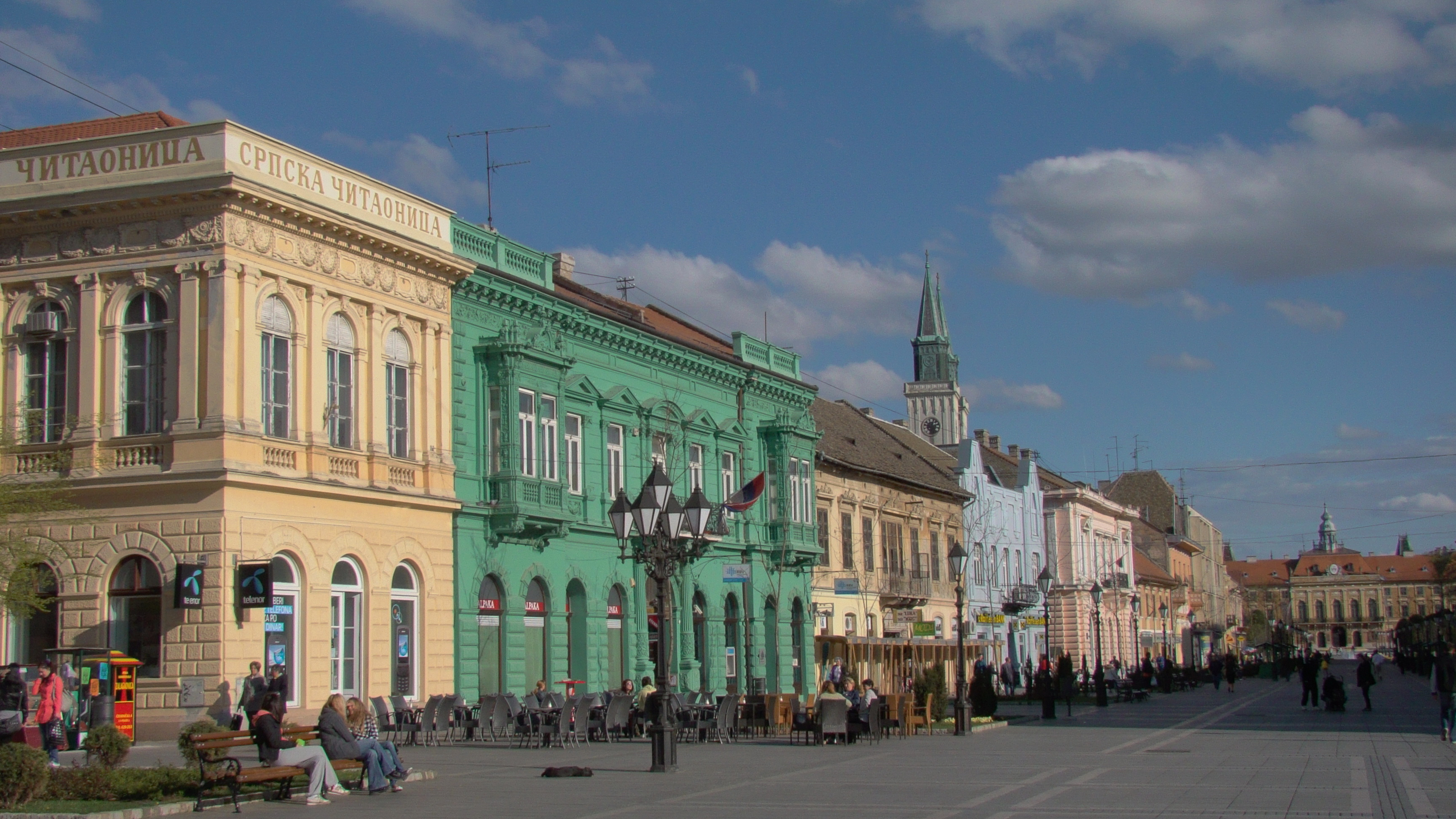
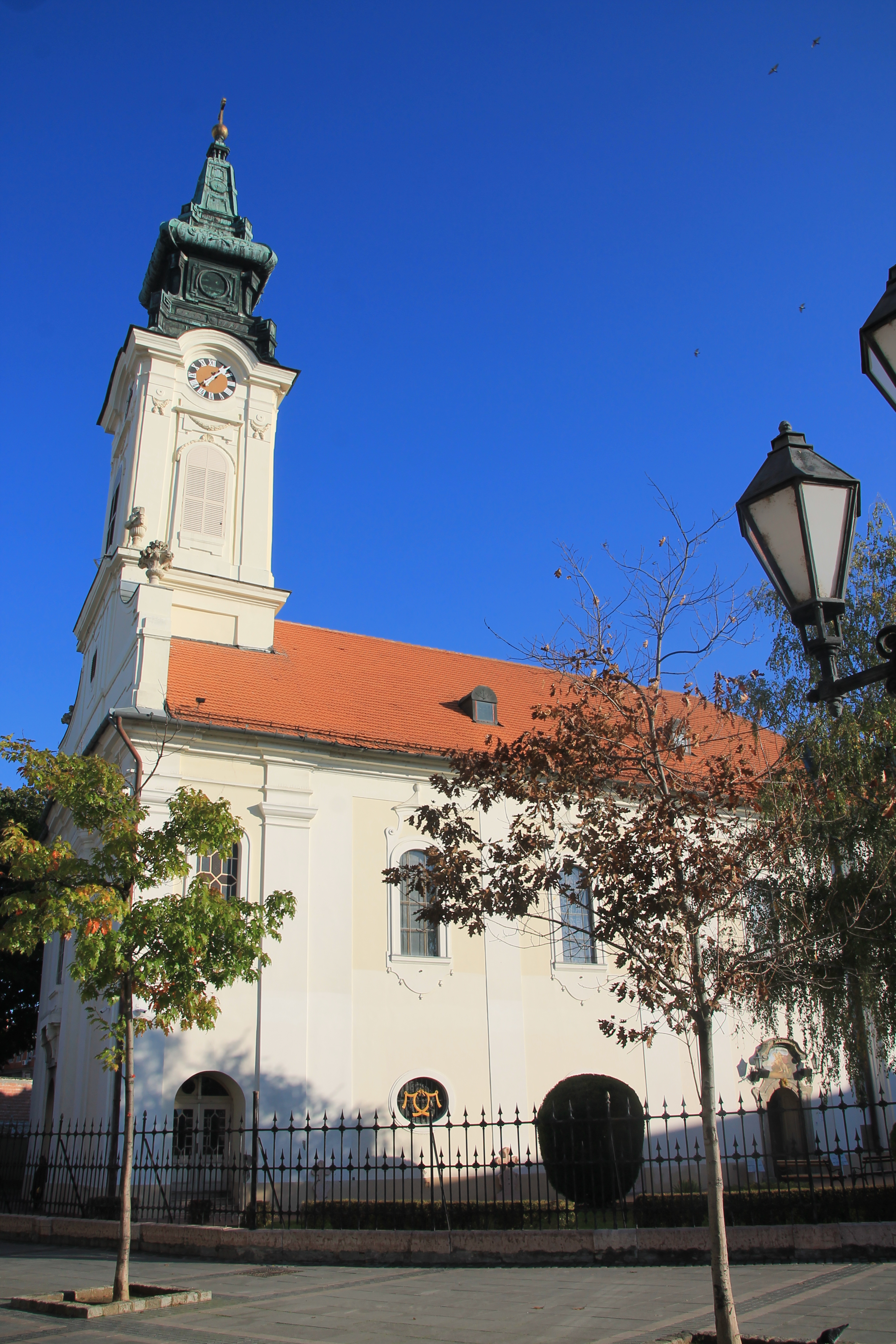
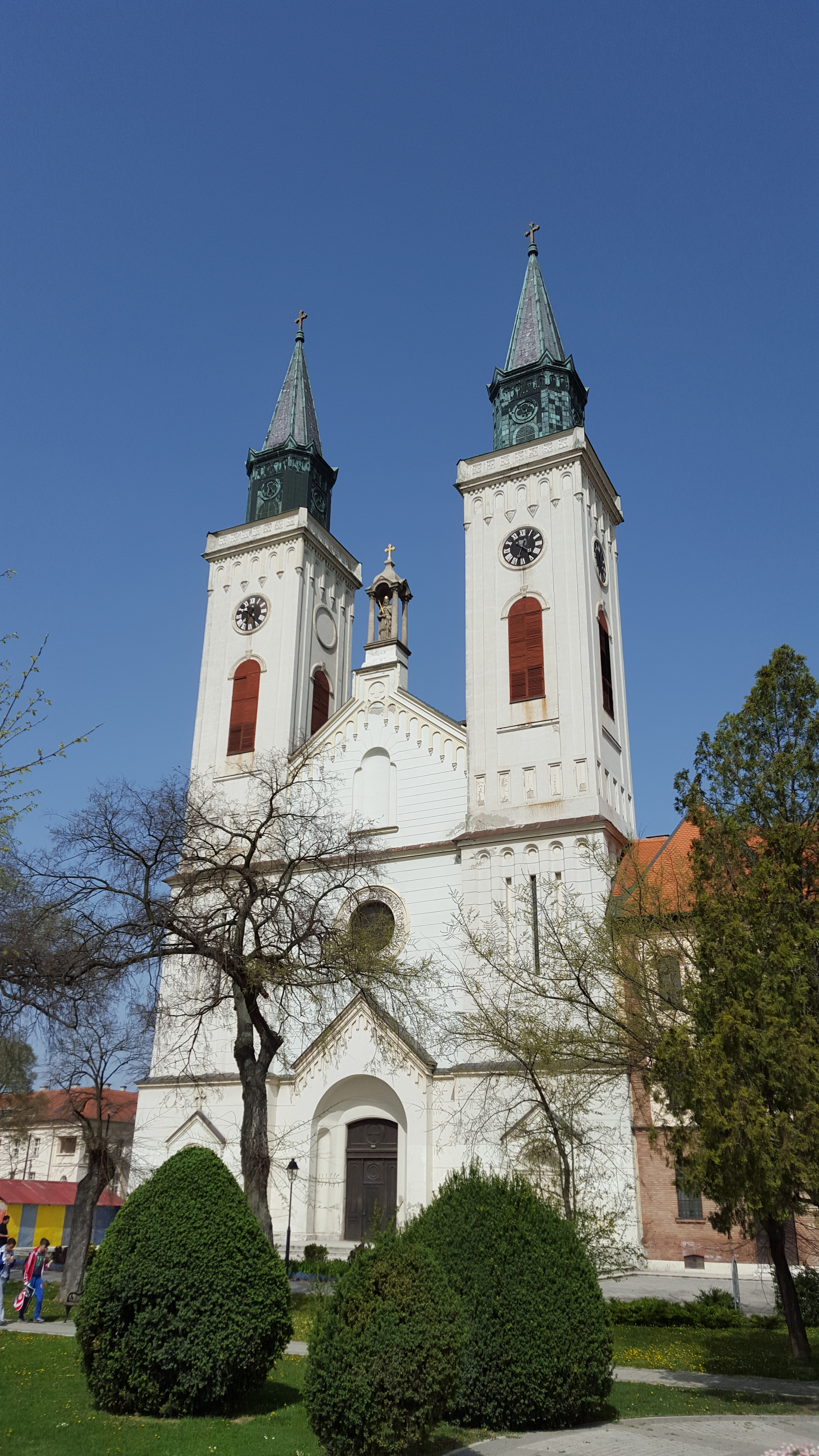
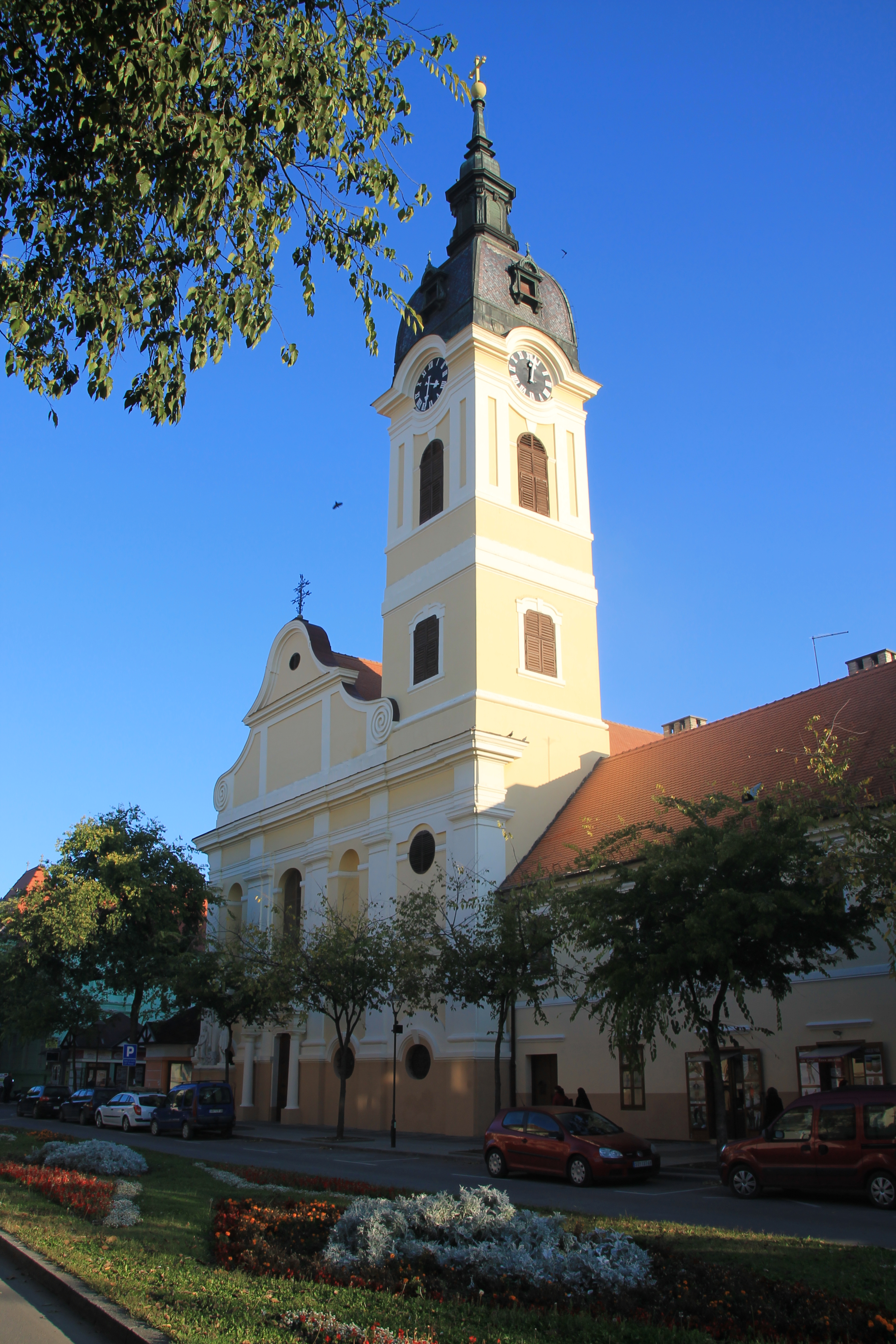
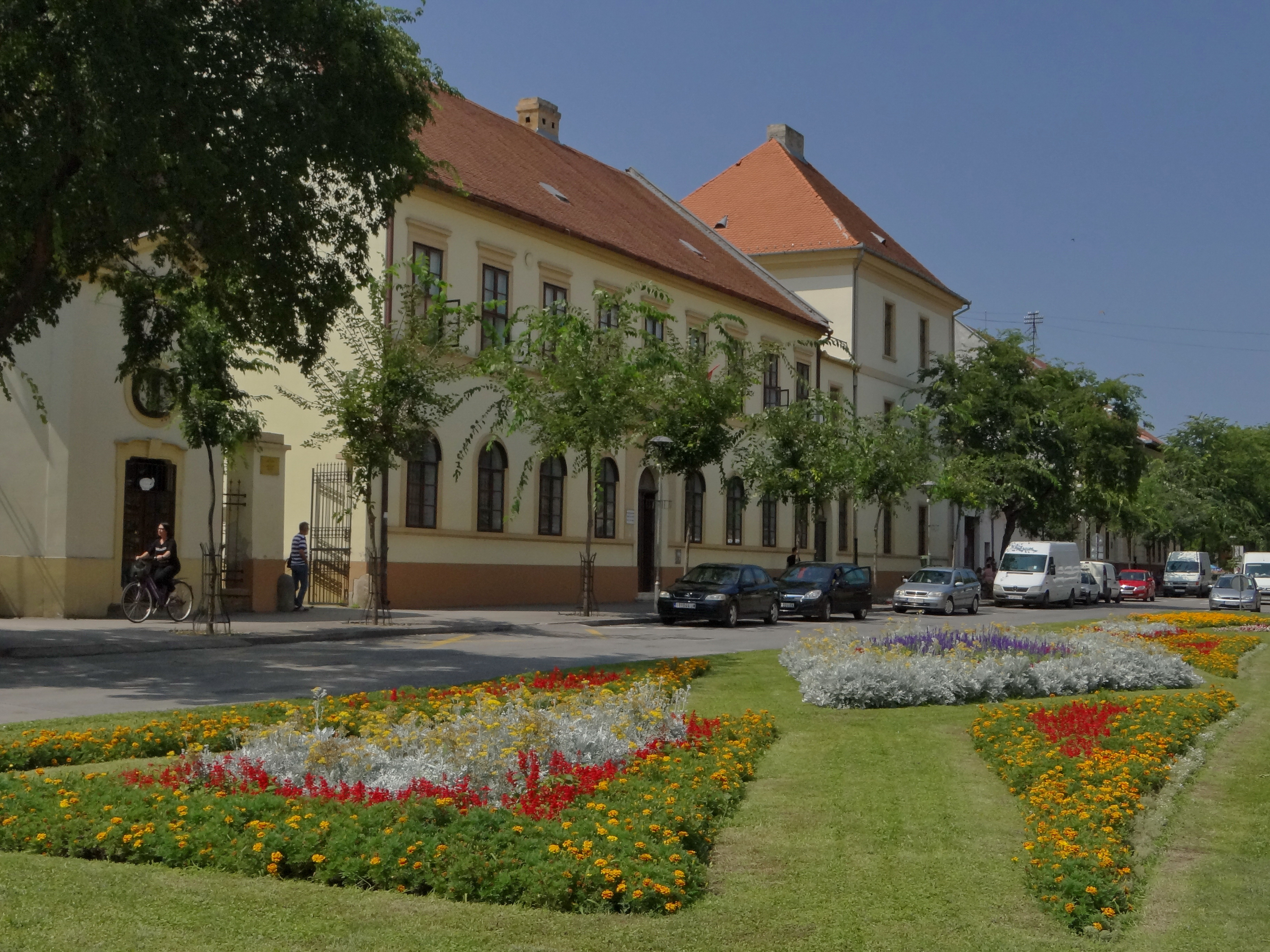
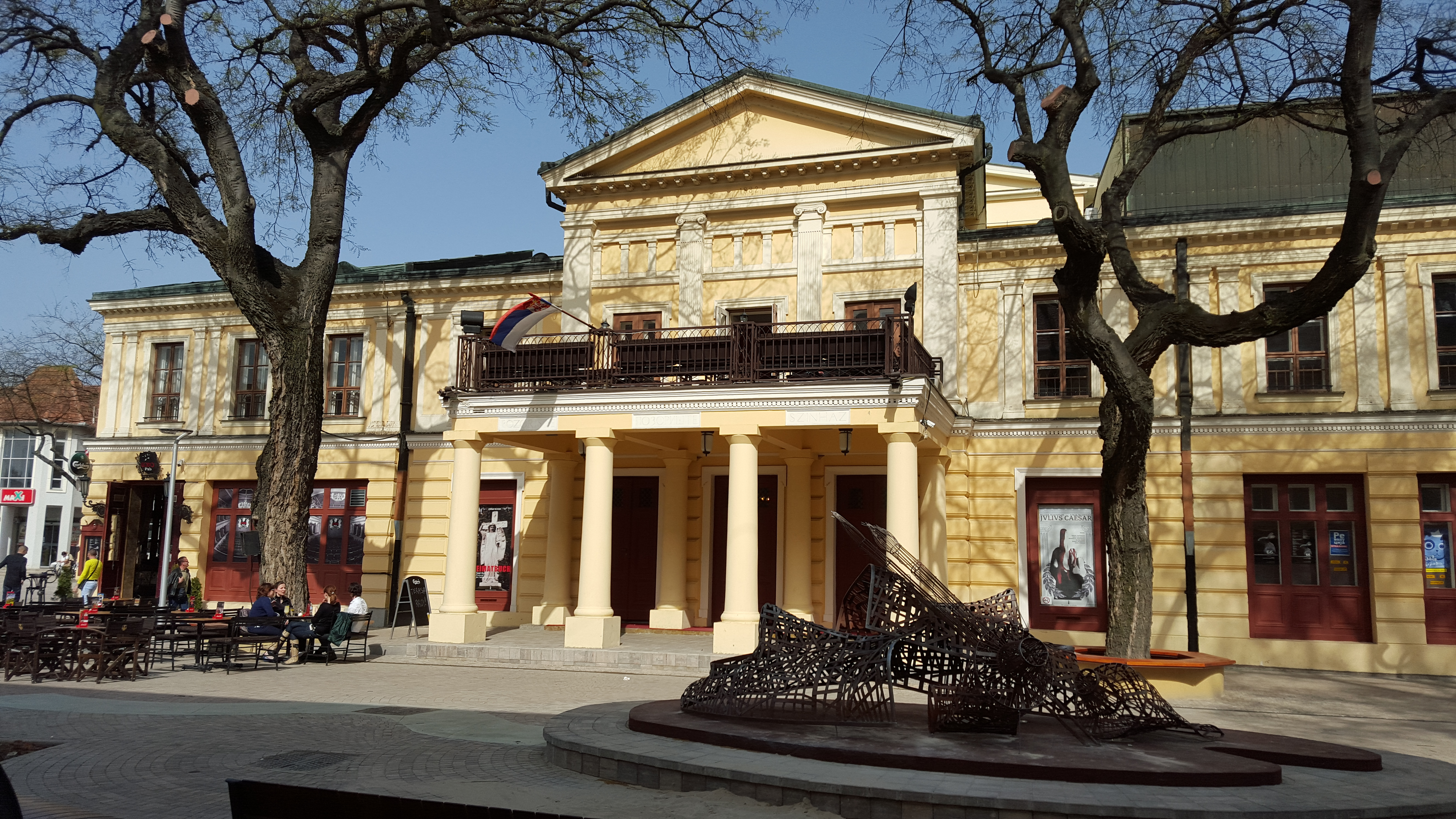
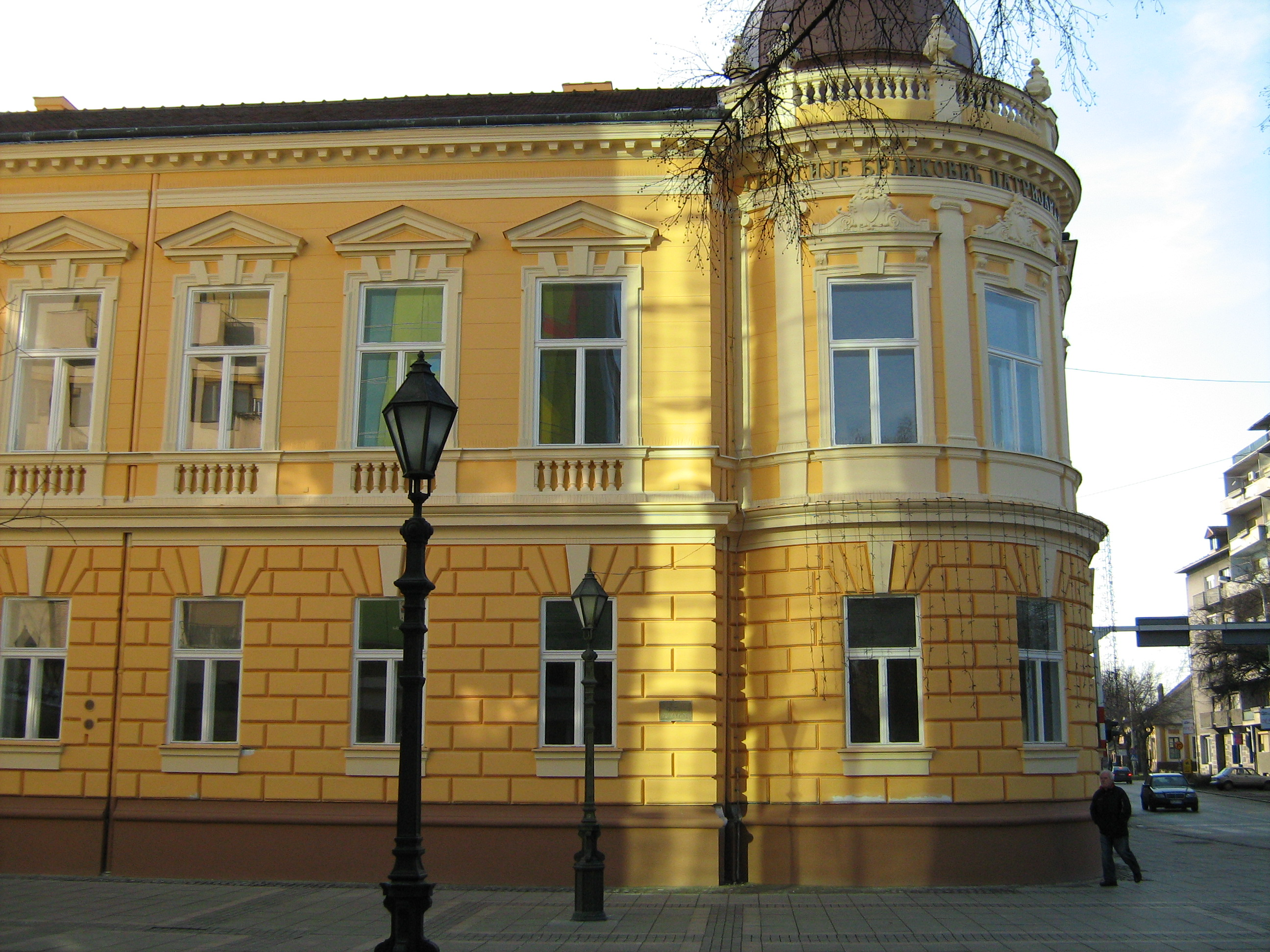
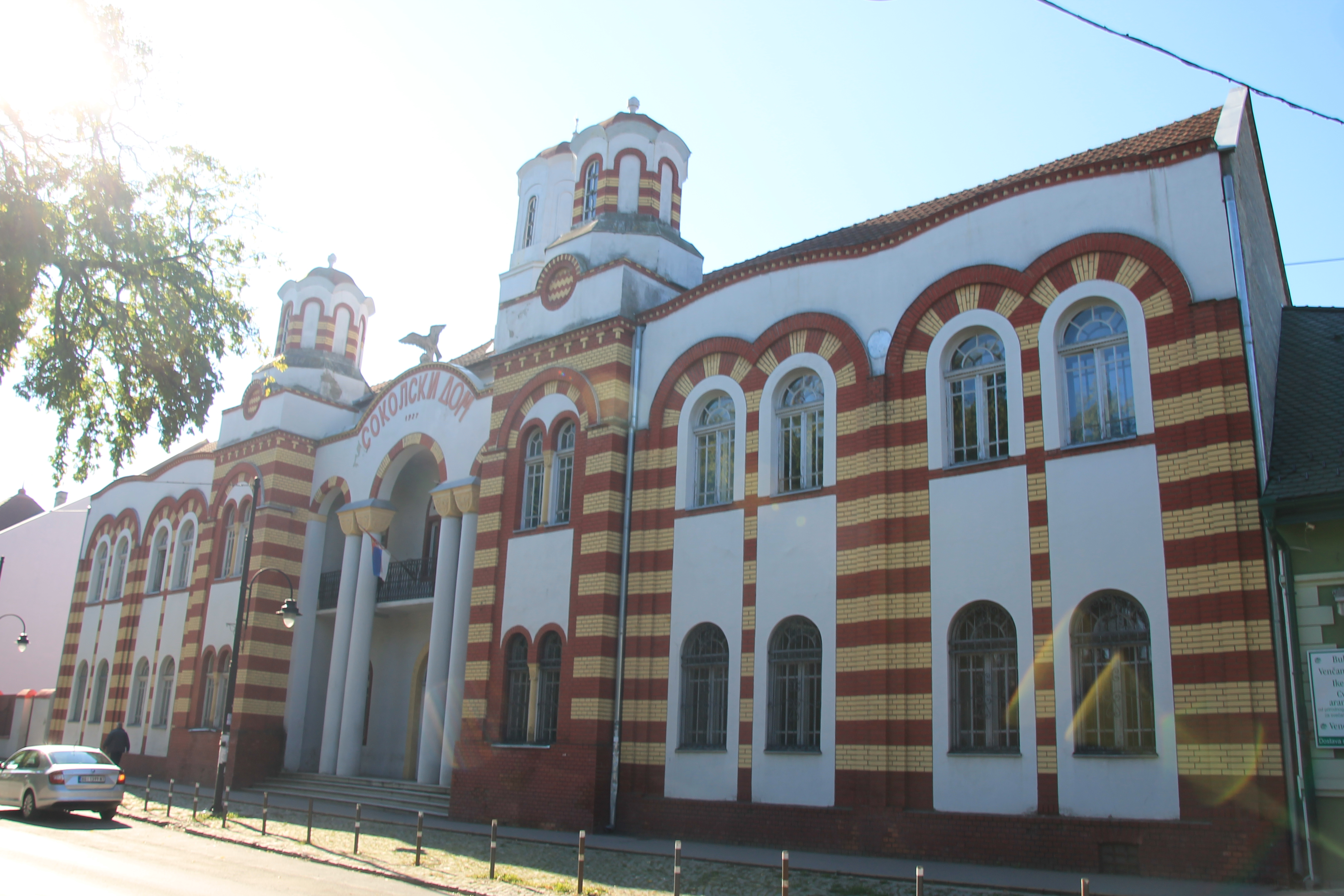
- Bács-Bodrog County Palace Old Sombor City Hall Kralja Petra I Street in Sombor Church of St. George Church of St. Stephen the King Church of the Holy Trinity Krušper's Palace National Theatre in Sombor Preparandija building Sokol House in Sombor

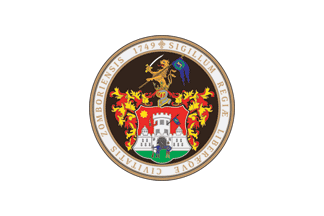
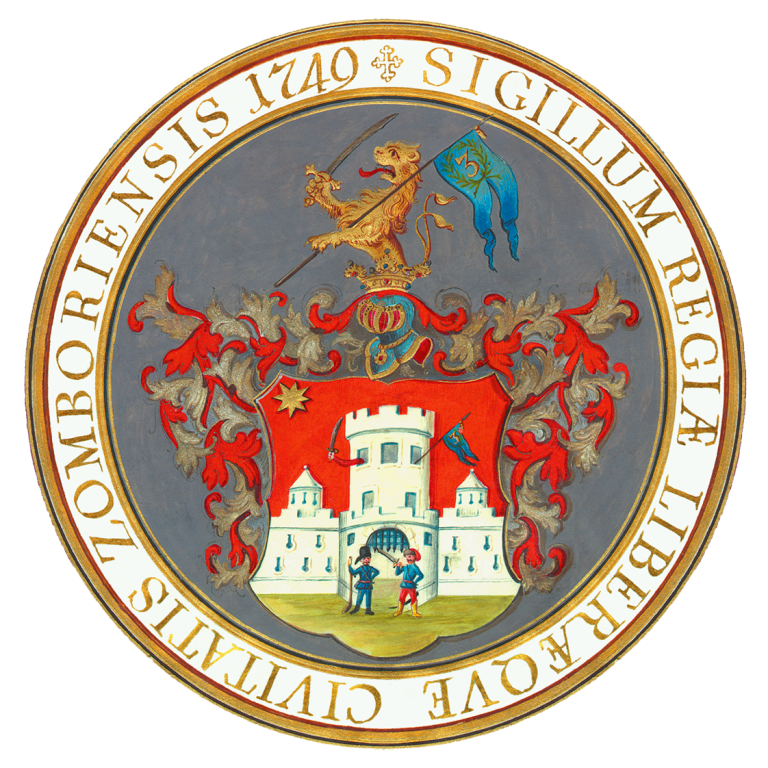
- Flag Coat of arms

- Location within Vojvodina Location within Serbia Location within Europe
- Coordinates: 45°47′N 19°07′E
- Country: Serbia
- Province: Vojvodina
- Region: Bačka
- District: West Bačka
- Municipality: Sombor
- City status: 17 February 1749
- Settlements: 16

Government
  - Mayor: Antonio Ratković (SNS)

Area
  - Rank: 7th in Serbia
  - Urban: 289.23 km^{2} (111.67 sq mi)
  - Administrative: 1,216.80 km^{2} (469.81 sq mi)
- Elevation: 90 m (300 ft)

Population (2022 census)
  - Rank: 19th in Serbia
  - Urban: 41,814
  - Urban density: 144.57/km^{2} (374.43/sq mi)
  - Administrative: 70,818
  - Administrative density: 58.200/km^{2} (150.74/sq mi)
- Time zone: UTC+1 (CET)
  - Summer (DST): UTC+2 (CEST)
- Postal code: 25000
- Area code: +381 25
- ISO 3166 code: SRB
- Car plates: SO
- Official languages: Serbian together with Hungarian on the entire territory and Croatian in Bački Monoštor, Bački Breg and Svetozar Miletić
- Website: www.sombor.rs

Sombor (Serbian Cyrillic: Сомбор, pronounced [sɔ̂ːmbɔr]; Hungarian: Zombor; Pannonian Rusyn: Зомбор, romanized: Zombor) is a city and the administrative center of the West Bačka District in the autonomous province of Vojvodina, Serbia. The city has a total population of 41,814 (as of 2022), while its administrative area (including neighboring villages) has 70,818 inhabitants.

== Name and etymology ==
In Serbian, the city is known as Sombor (Сомбор), and in Hungarian as Zombor.

The older Hungarian name for the city was Czoborszentmihály. The name originates from the Czobor family, who were the owners of this area in the 14th century. The family name came from the Slavic name Cibor. The city was mentioned in historical documents under several different names.

An unofficial name for the city is Ravangrad (Раванград), which literally means "flat town" in Serbian.

== History ==
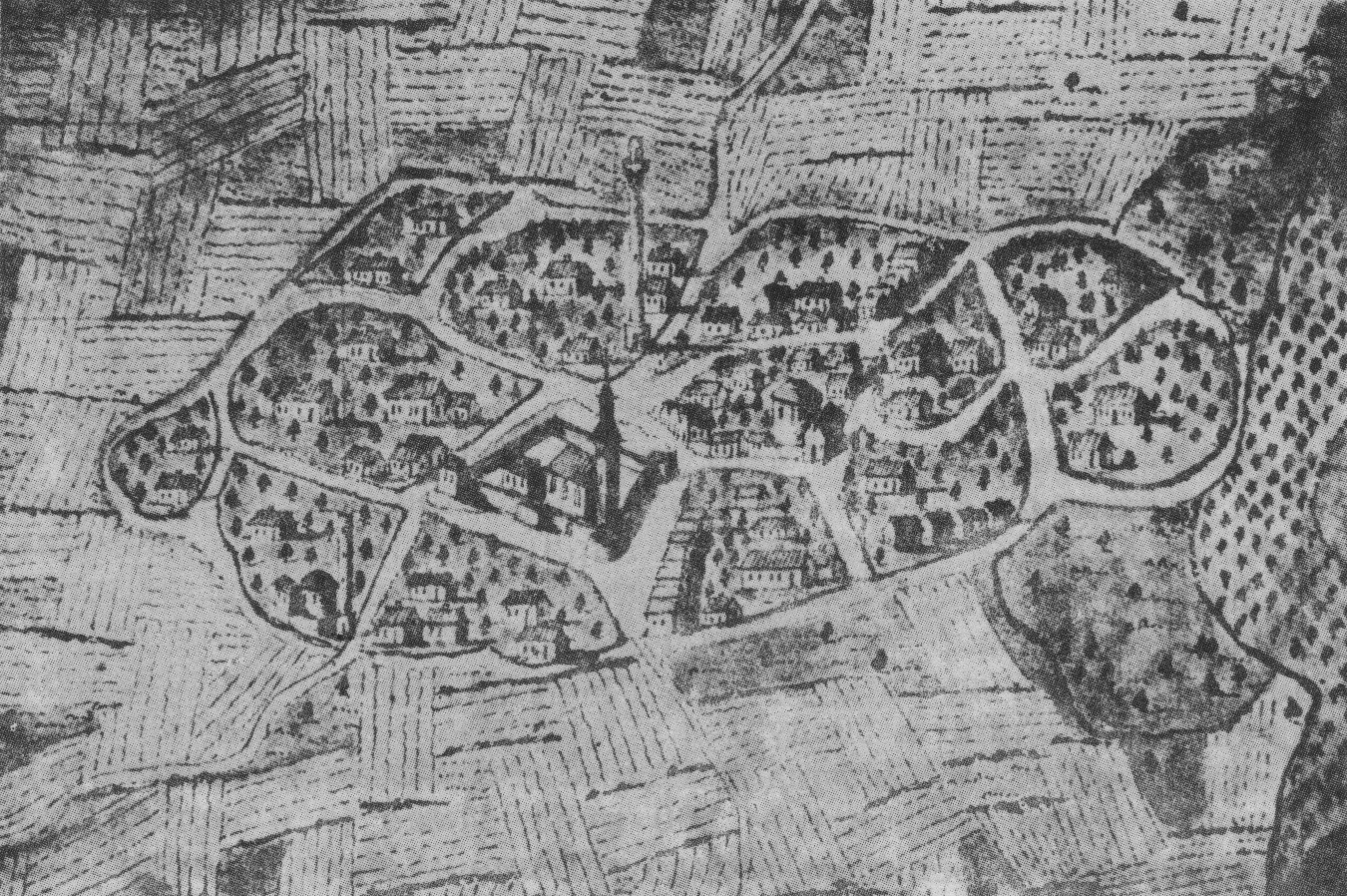
Sombor in 1698, displaying a mix of Christian and Islamic architecture

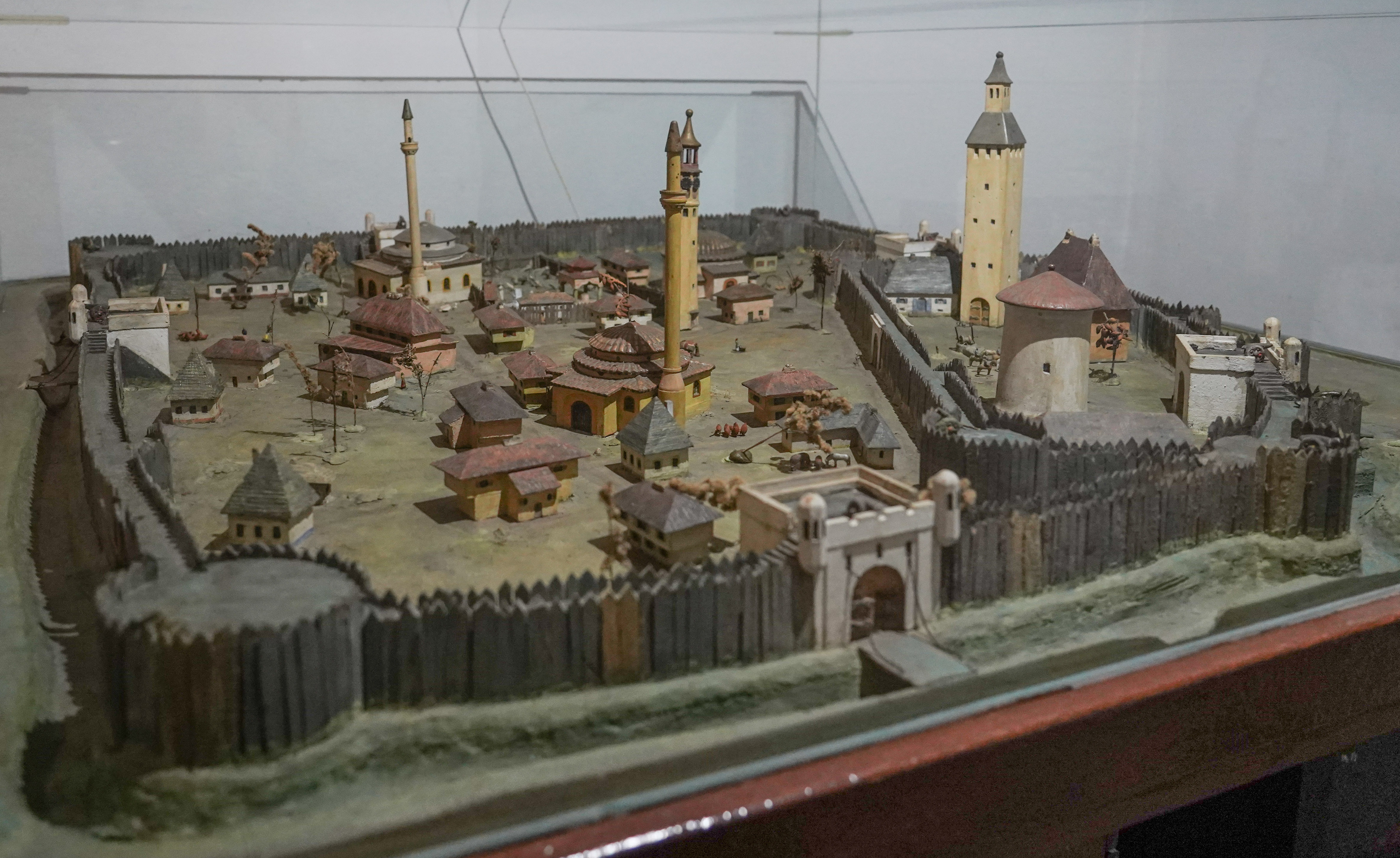
A scale model of the fortified central district of 17th century Sombor located in the Sombor City Museum

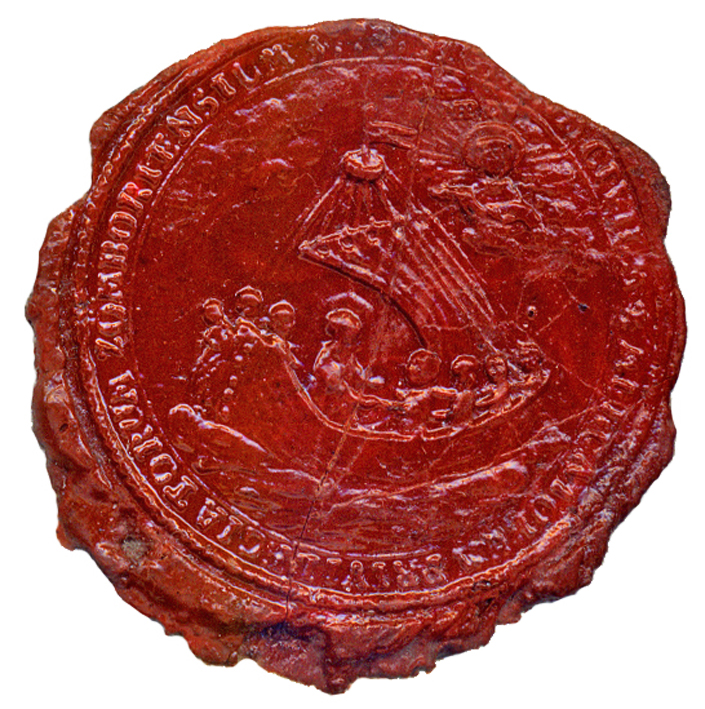
Wax seal of the Sombor city merchant guild from 1778

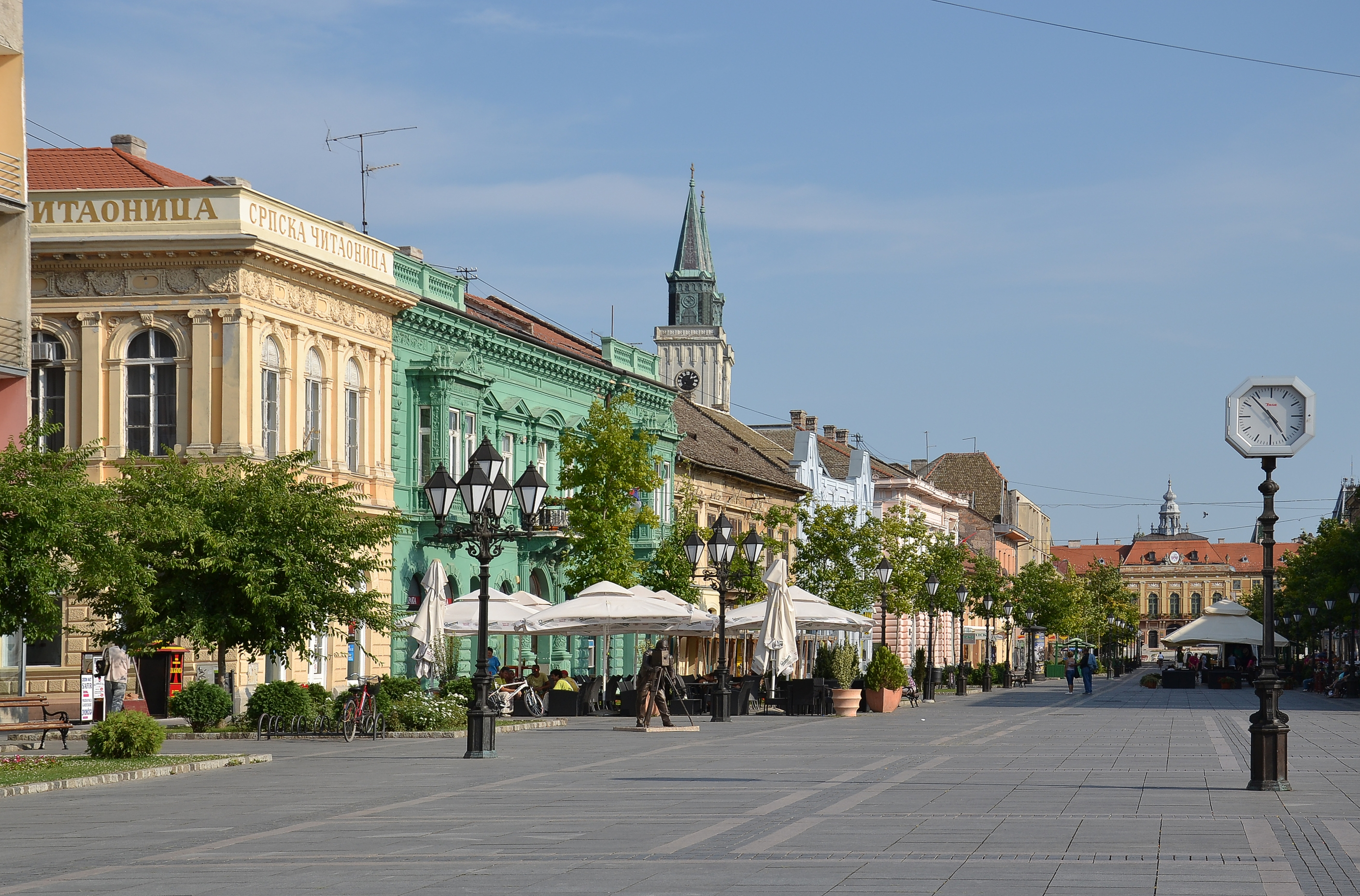
Main pedestrian street

The first historical record relating to the city is from 1340. The city was administered by the Kingdom of Hungary until the 16th century, when it became part of the Ottoman Empire. During the establishment of Ottoman authority, the local Hungarian population left the region. As a result, the city became populated mostly by ethnic Serbs. It was called "Sonbor" during Ottoman administration and was a kaza centre in the Sanjak of Segedin at first in Budin Province until 1596, and then in Eğri Province between 1596 and 1687.

In 1665, a well-known traveller, Evliya Çelebi, visited Sombor and wrote: "All the folk (in the city) are not Hungarian, but Wallachian-Christian (Serb). These places are something special; they do not belong to Hungary, but are a part of Bačka and Wallachia. Most of the inhabitants are traders, and all of them wear frontiersmen clothes; they are very polite and brave people." According to Celebi, the city had 200 shops, 14 mosques and about 2,000 houses. From 12 September 1687, the city was under Habsburg administration, and was included into the Habsburg Military Frontier. Ottomans attempted to recapture it during the Battle of Zenta on 11 September 1697. However their attack was repulsed.

In 1717, the first Orthodox elementary school was opened. Five years later a Roman Catholic elementary school was opened as well. In 1745, Sombor was excluded from the Military Frontier and was included into Bacsensis County. In 1749, Sombor gained royal free city status and acquired 11 additional areas on which farm settlements were founded over time. In 1786, the city became the seat of Bacsensis-Bodrogiensis County. According to 1786 data, the population of the city numbered 11,420 people, mostly Serbs. As a royal free city, Sombor was entitled to a democratically elected civil government that consisted of three chambers, the Upper House (Exteriori Senatus), the Lower House (Inferiori Senatus), and the Selected Community (Selecta Comunitatis). There was also a city Captain, a Chief Judge, a Tribune, and dozens of other appointed city officials.

According to the 1843 data, Sombor had 21,086 inhabitants, of whom 11,897 were Orthodox Christians, 9,082 Roman Catholics, 56 Jewish, and 51 Protestants. The main language spoken in the city at that time was Serbian, and the second-largest language was German. In 1848/1849, Sombor was part of the Serbian Vojvodina, a Serb autonomous region within Austrian Empire, while between 1849 and 1860, it was part of the Voivodeship of Serbia and Temes Banat, a separate Austrian crown land. Sombor was a seat of the district within voivodship. After the abolishment of this crown land, Sombor again became the seat of the Bacsensis-Bodrogiensis (Bács-Bodrog, Bačka-Bodrog) County.

According to the 1910 census, the population of Sombor was 30,593 people, of whom 11,881 spoke Serbian, 10,078 spoke Hungarian, 6,289 spoke Bunjevac, and 2,181 spoke German.

In 1918, Sombor became part of the Kingdom of Serbs, Croats and Slovenes (later known as the Kingdom of Yugoslavia). Between 1918 and 1922 it was part of Bačka County, between 1922 and 1929 part of Bačka Oblast, and between 1929 and 1941 part of Danube Banovina.

In 1941, the city was occupied by the Axis powers and annexed by Hungary. Many prominent citizens from the Serb community were interned and later executed. In 1944, the Yugoslav Partisans and Soviet Red Army expelled the Axis forces from the city. Since 1944, Sombor was part of the Autonomous Province of Vojvodina of the new Socialist Yugoslavia and (since 1945) socialist Serbia. Today, Sombor is the seat of the West Bačka District in the Autonomous Province of Vojvodina in the Republic of Serbia.

== Geography ==
=== Climate ===
Climate in this area has mild differences between highs and lows, and there is adequate rainfall year-round. The Köppen Climate Classification subtype for this climate is "Cfa" (Warm Temperate Climate/humid subtropical climate).

Climate data for Sombor (1991–2020, extremes 1961–2020)
Month	Jan	Feb	Mar	Apr	May	Jun	Jul	Aug	Sep	Oct	Nov	Dec	Year
Record high °C (°F)	19.3 (66.7)	21.3 (70.3)	27.6 (81.7)	30.8 (87.4)	35.1 (95.2)	37.1 (98.8)	40.3 (104.5)	40.6 (105.1)	36.5 (97.7)	30.0 (86.0)	25.7 (78.3)	20.7 (69.3)	40.6 (105.1)
Mean daily maximum °C (°F)	4.2 (39.6)	7.0 (44.6)	12.7 (54.9)	18.6 (65.5)	23.4 (74.1)	27.0 (80.6)	29.0 (84.2)	29.3 (84.7)	23.9 (75.0)	18.3 (64.9)	11.2 (52.2)	4.7 (40.5)	17.4 (63.3)
Daily mean °C (°F)	0.6 (33.1)	2.1 (35.8)	6.7 (44.1)	12.2 (54.0)	17.2 (63.0)	20.9 (69.6)	22.5 (72.5)	22.0 (71.6)	16.8 (62.2)	11.5 (52.7)	6.3 (43.3)	1.4 (34.5)	11.7 (53.1)
Mean daily minimum °C (°F)	−2.7 (27.1)	−2.0 (28.4)	1.6 (34.9)	6.1 (43.0)	10.9 (51.6)	14.5 (58.1)	15.8 (60.4)	15.5 (59.9)	11.2 (52.2)	6.5 (43.7)	2.6 (36.7)	−1.5 (29.3)	6.5 (43.7)
Record low °C (°F)	−27.2 (−17.0)	−26.8 (−16.2)	−24.5 (−12.1)	−5.6 (21.9)	−1.0 (30.2)	2.0 (35.6)	7.3 (45.1)	4.6 (40.3)	−2.2 (28.0)	−6.9 (19.6)	−18.4 (−1.1)	−23.7 (−10.7)	−27.2 (−17.0)
Average precipitation mm (inches)	37.1 (1.46)	37.7 (1.48)	35.4 (1.39)	40.3 (1.59)	64.8 (2.55)	79.8 (3.14)	72.7 (2.86)	56.2 (2.21)	60.9 (2.40)	54.3 (2.14)	49.5 (1.95)	47.3 (1.86)	636.0 (25.04)
Average precipitation days (≥ 0.1 mm)	11.8	10.7	10.3	10.9	13.0	11.8	10.0	8.6	10.2	9.5	11.1	12.3	130.2
Average snowy days	6.5	5.4	2.8	0.5	0.0	0.0	0.0	0.0	0.0	0.1	2.1	4.5	21.9
Average relative humidity (%)	84.0	77.9	69.6	65.0	64.5	64.8	63.4	65.0	70.7	75.7	82.5	85.9	72.4
Mean monthly sunshine hours	65.1	97.6	159.7	208.8	254.3	278.6	306.4	291.0	200.5	154.0	82.0	53.6	2,151.6
Source: Republic Hydrometeorological Service of Serbia

== Settlements ==
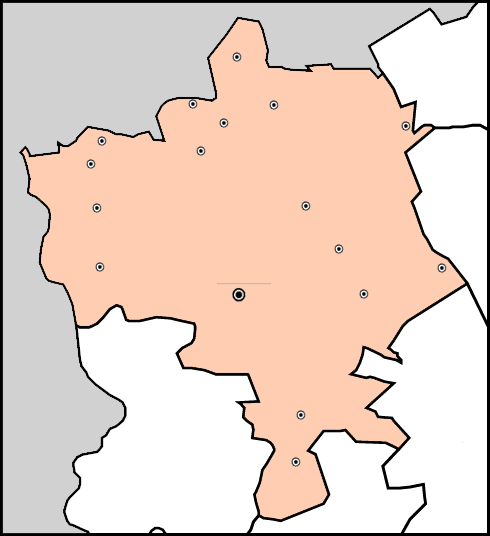

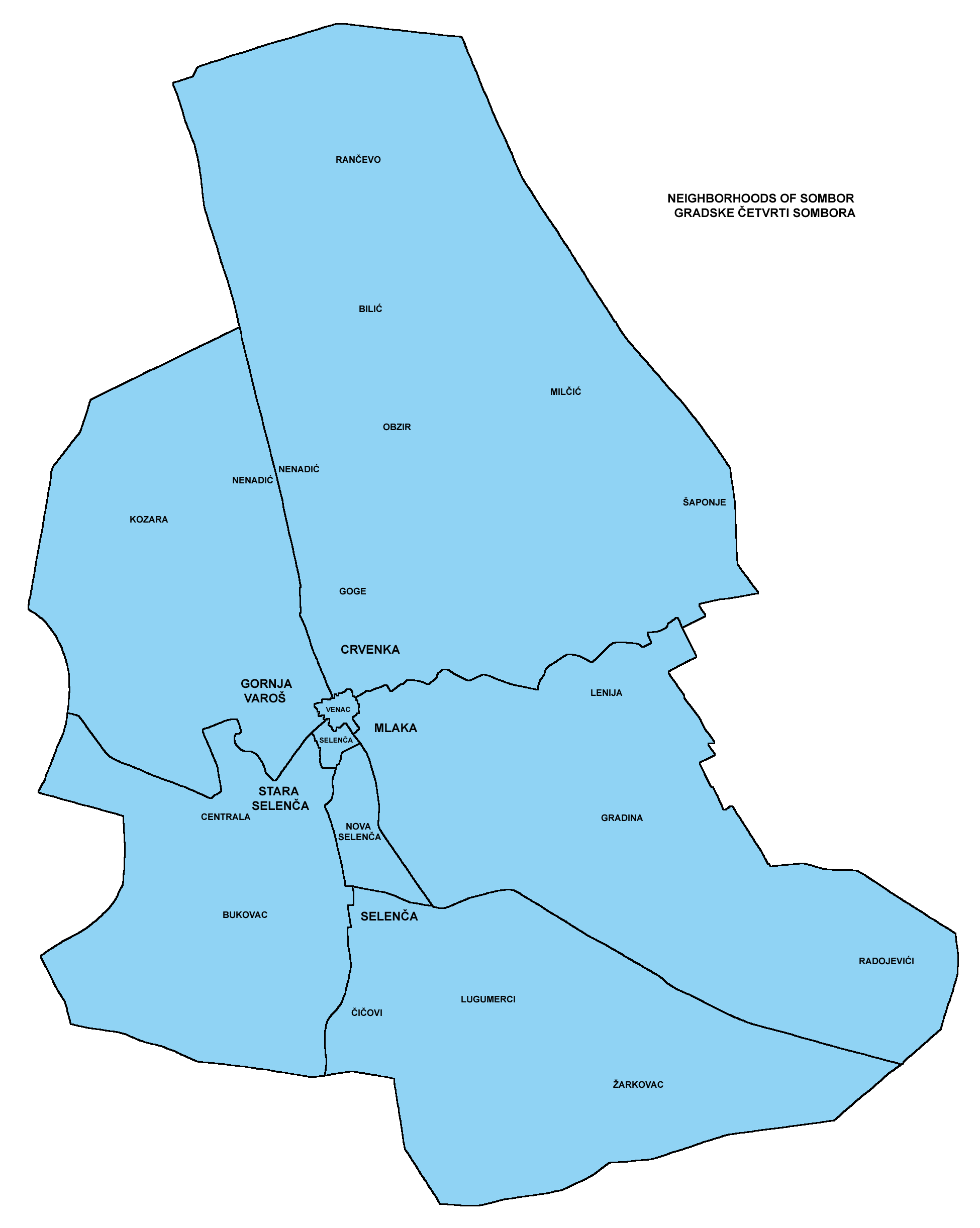
Neighborhoods of urban Sombor

The city administrative area of Sombor includes following villages:

- Aleksa Šantić
- Bački Breg
- Bački Monoštor
- Bezdan
- Gakovo
- Doroslovo
- Kljajićevo
- Kolut
- Rastina
- Riđica
- Svetozar Miletić
- Stanišić
- Stapar
- Telečka
- Čonoplja

Smaller and suburban settlements, "Salaši" include

- Bukovački Salaši
- Rančevo
- Kruševlje
- Bilić
- Lugomerci
- Žarkovac
- Šaponje
- Obzir
- Milčići
- Gradina
- Lenija
- Nenadić
- Radojevići

== Demographics ==
Historical population
Year	Pop.	±% p.a.
1948	90,477	—
1953	92,583	+0.46%
1961	96,191	+0.48%
1971	98,080	+0.19%
1981	99,168	+0.11%
1991	96,105	−0.31%
2002	97,263	+0.11%
2011	85,903	−1.37%
2022	70,818	−1.74%

According to the last official census done in 2011, the city of Sombor has 85,903 inhabitants.

=== Ethnic groups ===
Settlements with Serb ethnic majority (as of 2002) are: Sombor, Aleksa Šantić, Gakovo, Kljajićevo, Kolut, Rastina, Riđica, Stanišić, Stapar, and Čonoplja. Settlements with Croat/Šokac ethnic majority (as of 2002) are: Bački Breg and Bački Monoštor. Settlements with Hungarian ethnic majority (in 2002) are: Bezdan, Doroslovo, and Telečka. Ethnically mixed settlement with relative Hungarian majority is Svetozar Miletić.

The ethnic composition of the city:

Ethnic group	Population	%
Serbs	54,370	63.29%
Hungarians	9,874	11.49%
Croats	7,070	8.23%
Bunjevci	2,058	2.40%
Roma	1,015	1.18%
Yugoslavs	852	0.99%
Montenegrins	541	0.63%
Germans	494	0.58%
Macedonians	171	0.20%
Albanians	118	0.14%
Slovaks	117	0.14%
Others	9,223	10.74%
Total	85,903	

== Culture ==
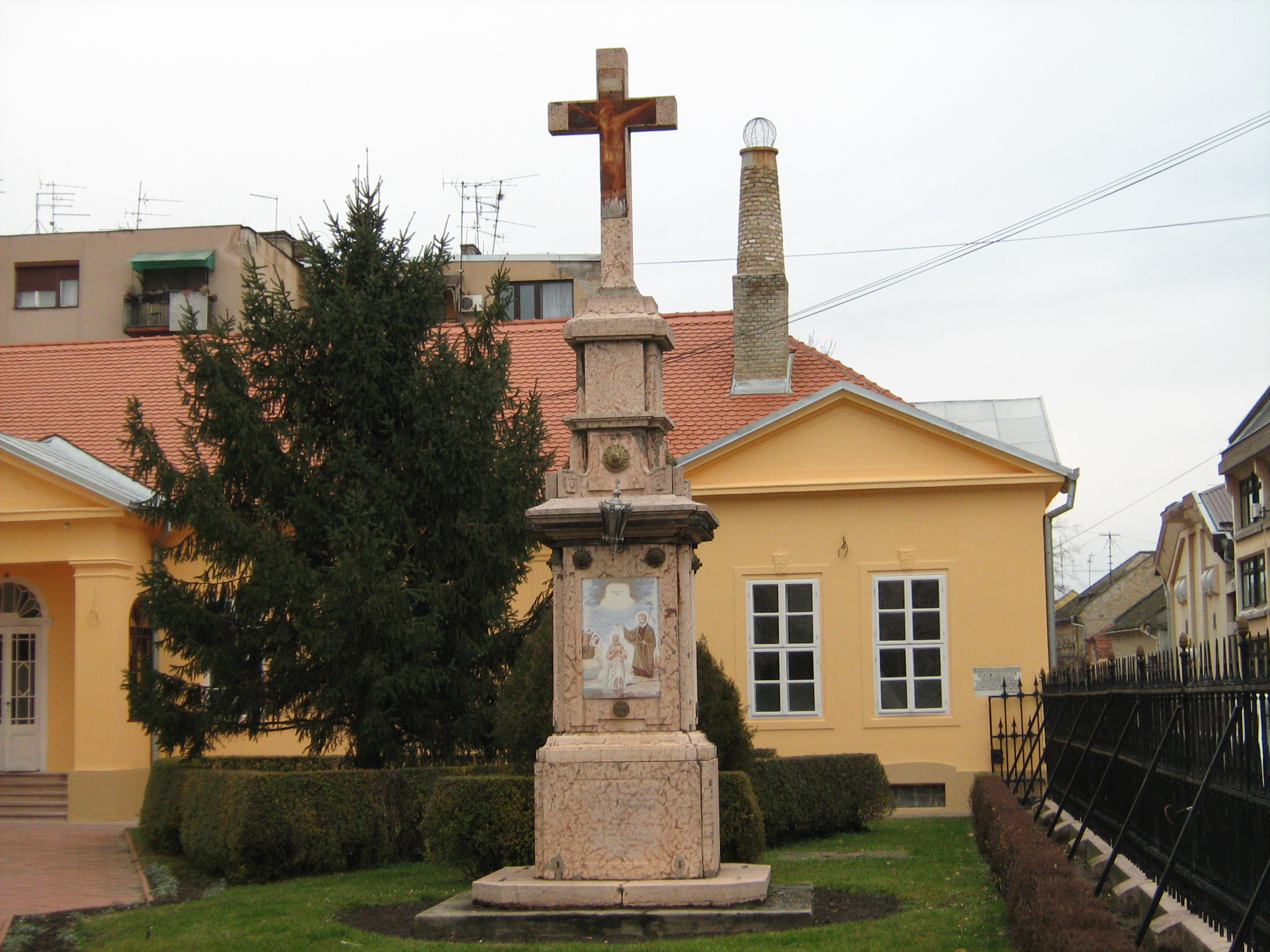
Building of former Sombor Norma where first civil school with Serbian as the language of instruction was established.

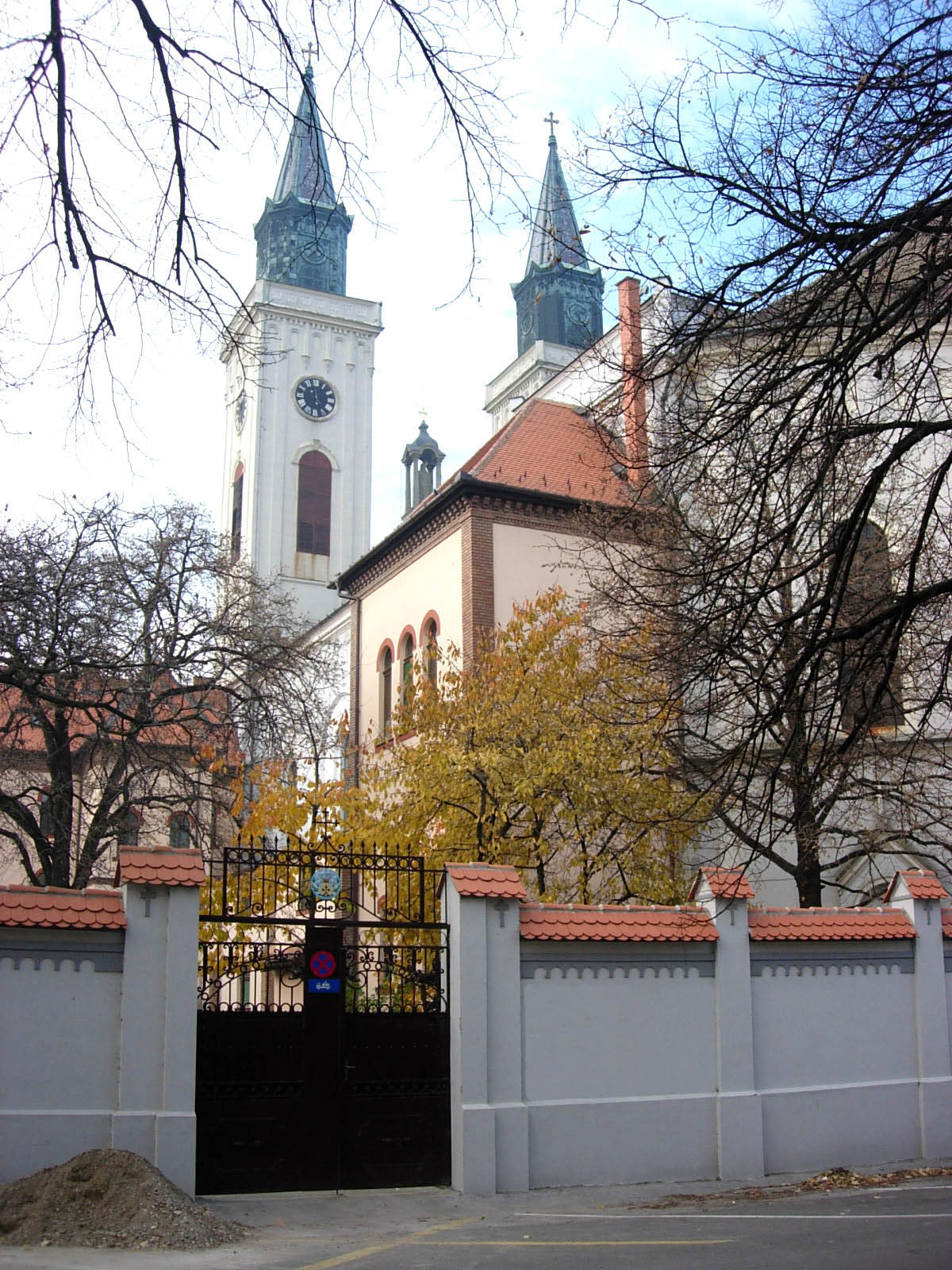
Carmelite monastery and church in the centre of the town.

Sombor is famous for its greenery, cultural life and beautiful 18th and 19th century center. The most important cultural institutions are the National Theater, the Sombor City Museum, the Modern Art Gallery, the Milan Konjović Art Gallery, the Teacher's College (Preparandija), the Serbian Reading House, and the Sombor Gymnasium. Teacher's College (Preparandija) founded in 1778, is the oldest college in Serbia and the region.

There are two monasteries in this city:

- Sombor Orthodox Monastery, founded in 1928–1933
- Discalced Carmelite Catholic monastery, founded in 1904

=== Buildings and architecture ===
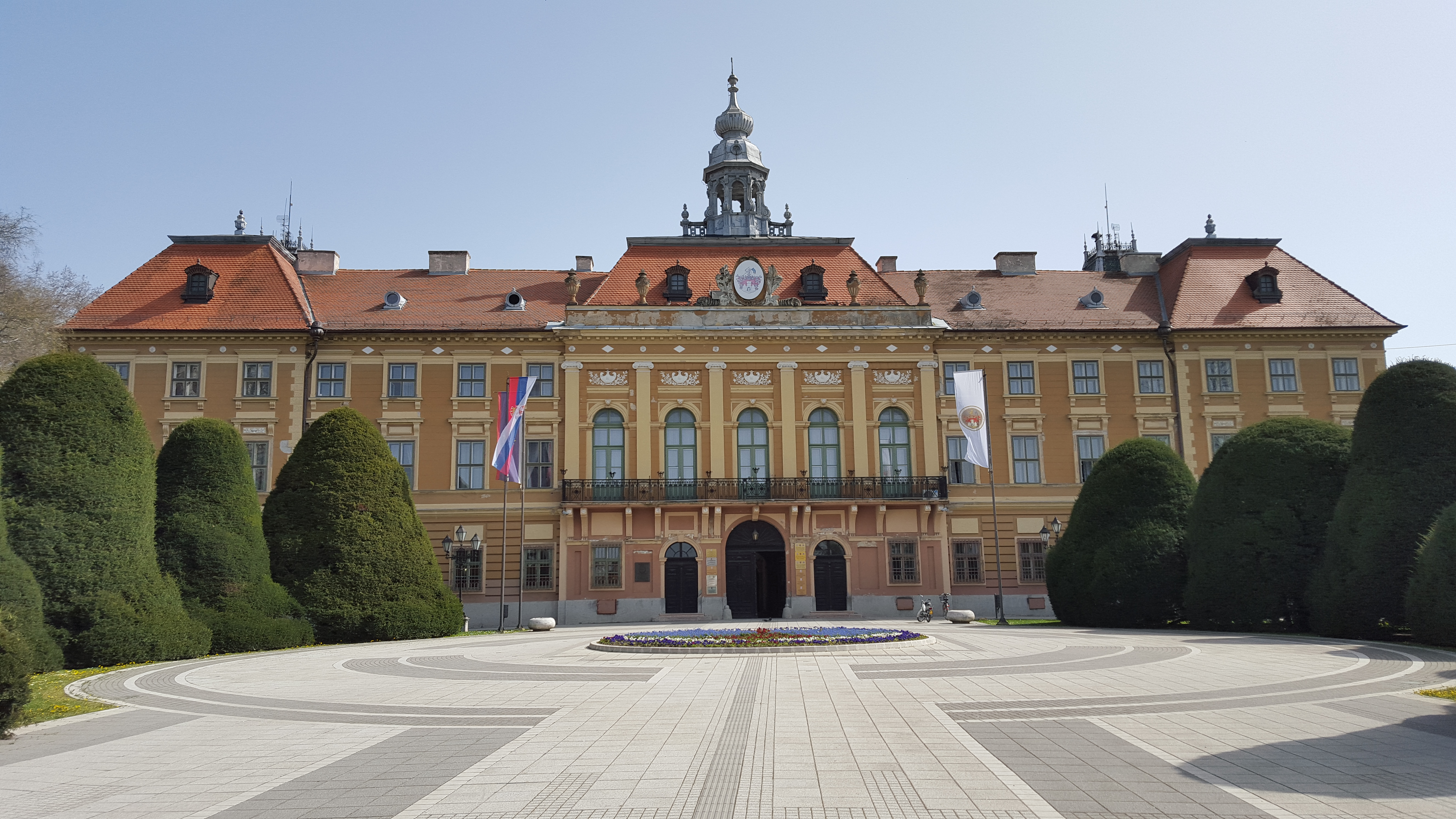
Županija building housing city and city administration

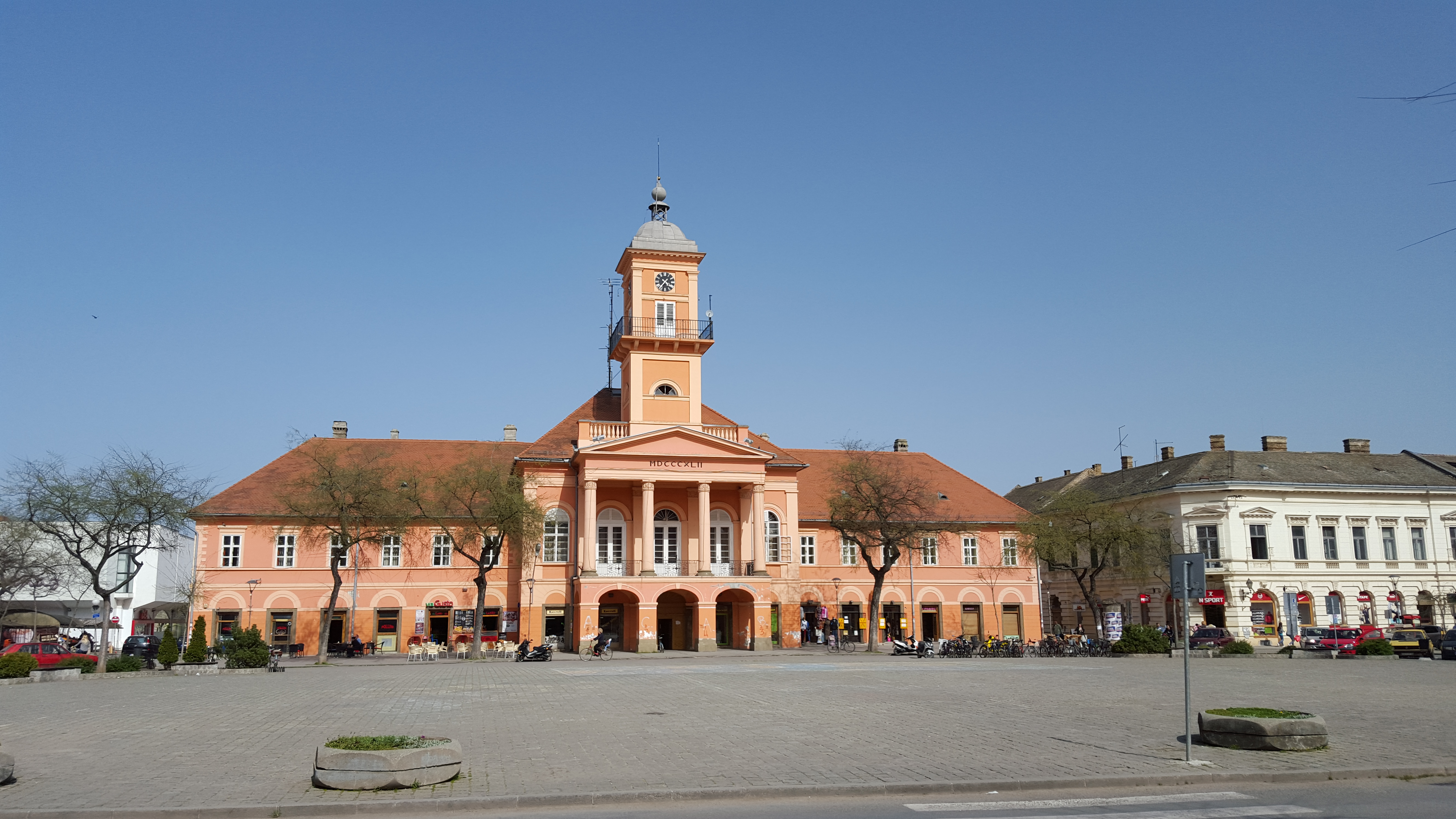
The old town hall of Sombor and the Holy Trinity Square

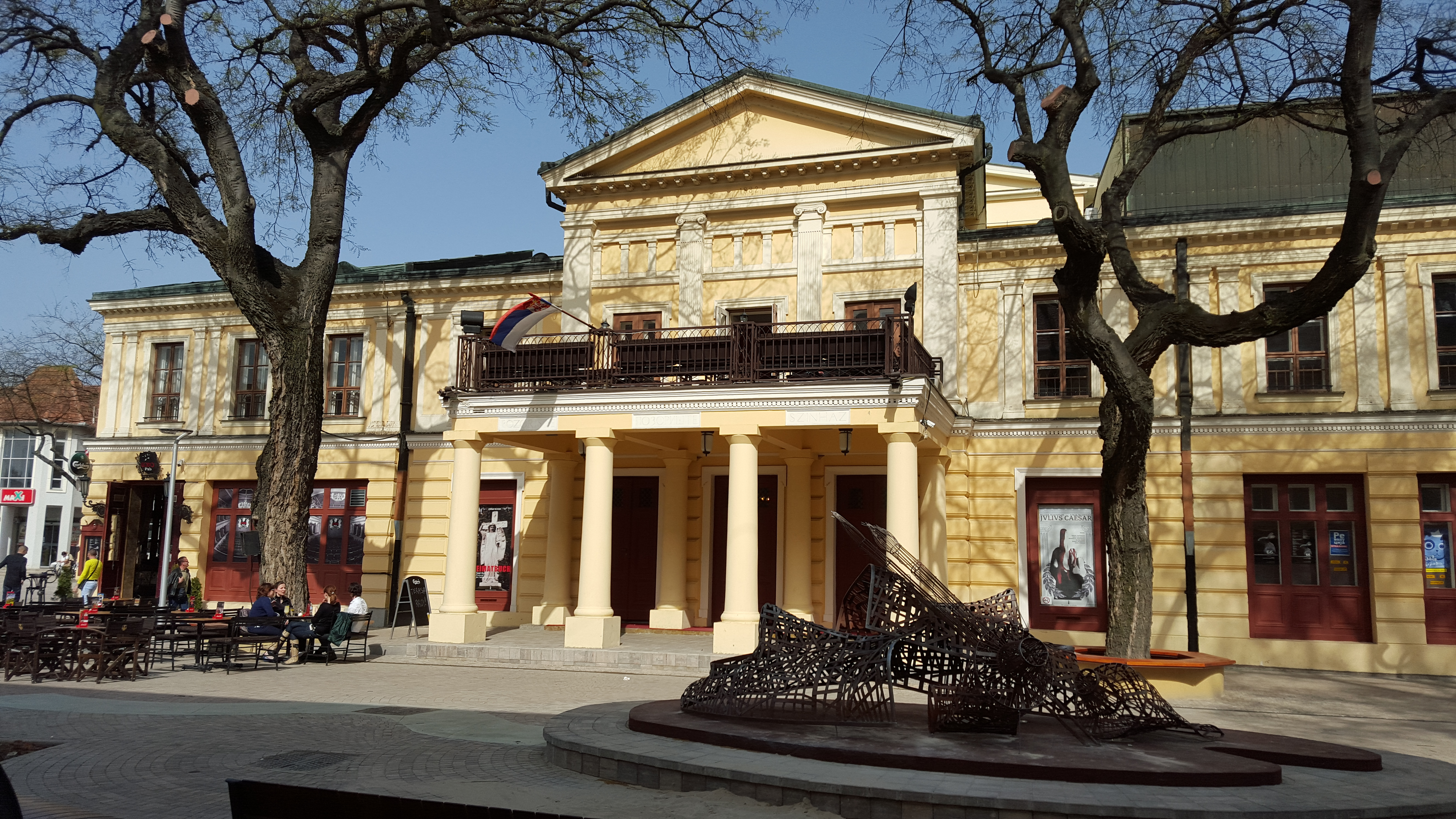
Sombor theater building

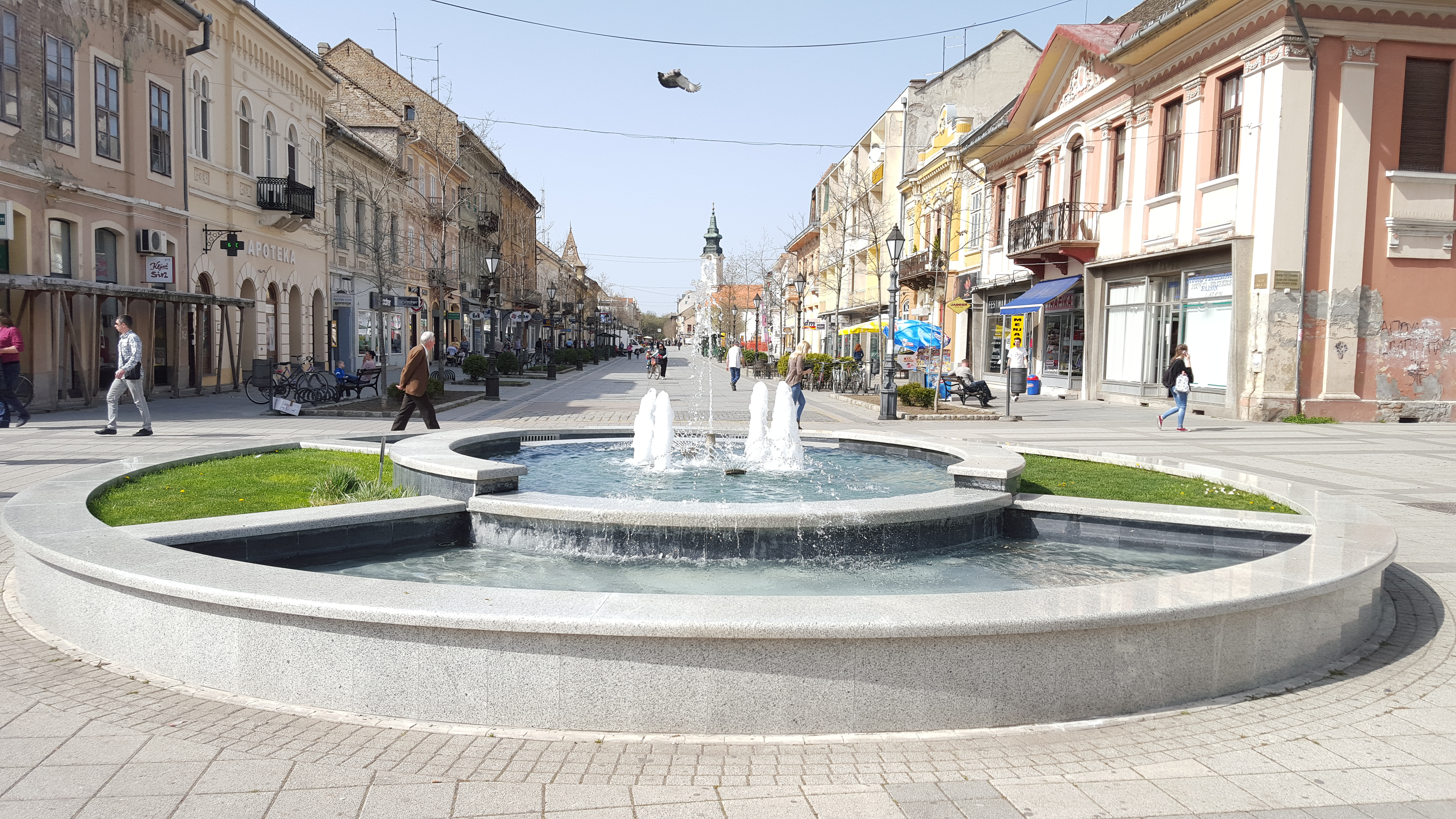
Sombor main street with the water fountain

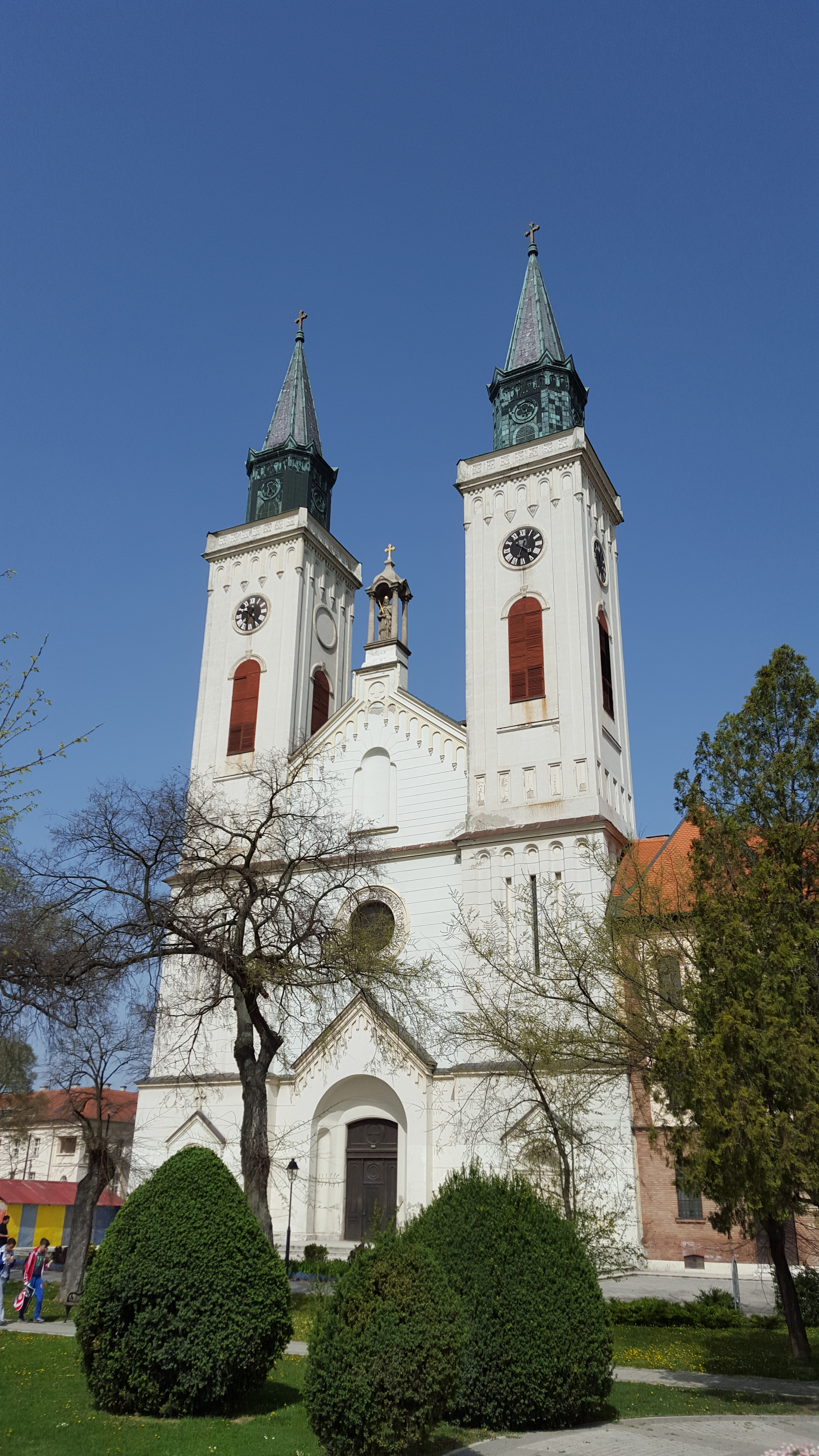
Catholic church in Sombor

== Economy ==
The following table gives a preview of total number of registered people employed in legal entities per their core activity (as of 2022):

Activity	Total
Agriculture, forestry and fishing	803
Mining and quarrying	3
Manufacturing	4,985
Electricity, gas, steam and air conditioning supply	197
Water supply; sewerage, waste management and remediation activities	257
Construction	903
Wholesale and retail trade, repair of motor vehicles and motorcycles	3,344
Transportation and storage	1,224
Accommodation and food services	823
Information and communication	284
Financial and insurance activities	332
Real estate activities	51
Professional, scientific and technical activities	687
Administrative and support service activities	991
Public administration and defense; compulsory social security	1,355
Education	1,697
Human health and social work activities	2,055
Arts, entertainment and recreation	315
Other service activities	443
Individual agricultural workers	976
Total	21,727

== Sports ==
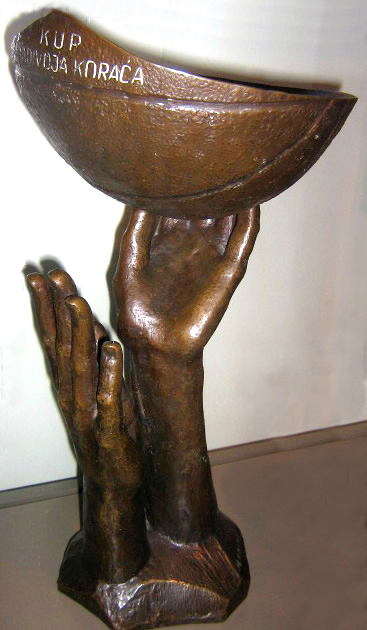
FIBA Korać Cup Trophy

Radnički Sombor is the main football club from the city competing in the 5th-tier PFL Sombor. They once played at the country's second level.

Sombor is the hometown of Radivoj Korać, the FIBA Hall of Fame basketball player. Korać holds the EuroLeague record for points in a game at 99.

Sombor is the hometown of 3x NBA MVP, NBA Champion and Finals MVP Nikola Jokić. The local basketball club where he began his playing career renamed itself KK Joker in 2017 after his English-language nickname, and was promoted to the top-level Basketball League of Serbia at the end of the 2022–23 season.

== Local media ==
=== Newspapers ===
- Somborske novine

=== TV stations ===
- K-54
- Spektar
- RTV Sreće

=== Radio stations ===
- Radio Marija (95.7)
- Radio Sombor (97.5)
- Radio Fortuna (106.6)

=== Internet media ===
- Novi Radio Sombor
- SOinfo.org

== Twin cities ==
Twin cities:

- Baja, Hungary
- Kispest, Hungary
- Veles, North Macedonia
- Istočno Sarajevo, Bosnia and Herzegovina

Regional cooperation:

- Osijek, Croatia
- Tuzla, Bosnia and Herzegovina
- Vukovar, Croatia

== Transportation ==
=== Buses ===
Buses offer direct connections to major Serbian cities including Belgrade, Novi Sad and Subotica, as well as many regional towns. Among the companies operating in the area is Severtrans.

=== Rail ===
Sombor is linked by direct rail links to Novi Sad and Subotica, among others.

=== Air ===
The city houses Sombor Airport.

== Notable residents ==
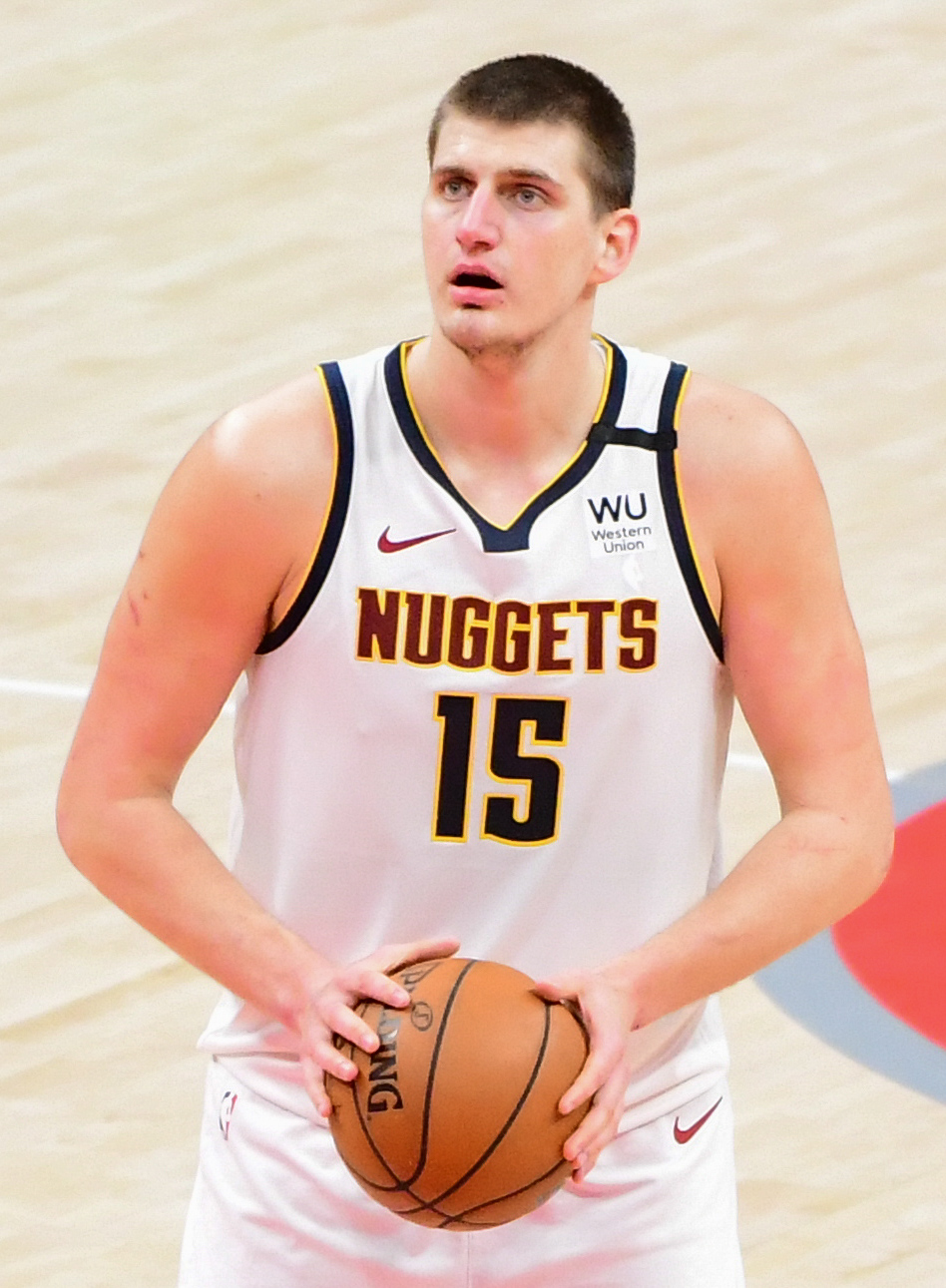
Basketball player Nikola Jokić was born in Sombor

- József Schweidel (b. 1796), Home Guard General, Martyr of Arad, his statue stood in the square in front of the County Hall until 1918.
- Samuilo Maširević (1804–1870), Orthodox Patriarch of Karlovci
- Laza Kostić (1841–1910), poet, prose writer, lawyer, philosopher, polyglot, publicist, and politician
- Ernest Bošnjak (1876–1963), cameraman, film director and printer. One of the founders of the filmography in the area
- Sándor Gombos (1895–1968), Olympic champion fencer
- Milan Konjović (1898–1993), prominent painter
- Joseph Kish (1899–1969), Academy Award winning Art Director
- Gustav Mezey (1899–1981), artist
- Andrija Konc (1919–1945), singer, born in Sombor.
- Sava Stojkov (1925–2014), naive art painter
- Bogdan Maglić (1928–2017), nuclear physicist
- Radivoj Korać (1938–1969), basketball player in the FIBA Hall of Fame
- Zvonko Bogdan (b. 1942), performer of traditional folk songs
- Iván Gutman (b. 1947), chemist and mathematician
- Nemanja Milić (b. 1990), professional football player
- Filip Krajinović (b. 1992), professional tennis player
- Nikola Jokić (b. 1995), professional basketball player, NBA Champion and Olympic silver medalist
- Filip Rebrača (b. 1997), professional basketball player

== See also ==
- List of cities in Serbia
- List of cities, towns and villages of Vojvodina
- West Bačka District
