= List of populated places in Hungary (H) =

This is a list of cities, towns and villages of Hungary

KEY: T = Town ; V = Village

Name	Rank	County	District	Population	Post code
Hács	V	Somogy	Lengyeltóti	419	8694
Hagyárosbörönd	V	Zala	Zalaegerszegi	302	8992
Hahót	V	Zala	Nagykanizsai	1,231	8771
Hajdúbagos	V	Hajdú-Bihar	Derecske–Létavértesi	1,981	4273
Hajdúböszörmény	T	Hajdú-Bihar	Hajdúböszörményi	32,220	4220
Hajdúdorog	T	Hajdú-Bihar	Hajdúböszörményi	9,640	4087
Hajdúhadház	T	Hajdú-Bihar	Hajdúhadházi	13,070	4242
Hajdúnánás	T	Hajdú-Bihar	Hajdúböszörményi	18,235	4080
Hajdúsámson	V	Hajdú-Bihar	Hajdúhadházi	11,293	4251
Hajdúszoboszló	T	Hajdú-Bihar	Hajdúszoboszlói	23,677	4200
Hajdúszovát	V	Hajdú-Bihar	Hajdúszoboszlói	3,200	4212
Hajmás	V	Somogy	Kaposvári	263	7473
Hajmáskér	V	Veszprém	Veszprémi	2,904	8192
Hajós	V	Bács-Kiskun	Kalocsai	3,501	6344
Halastó	Vas	Tolna	Körmendi	131	9814
Halászi	V	Gyor-Moson-Sopron	Mosonmagyaróvári	2,841	9228
Halásztelek	V	Pest	Ráckevei	7,224	2314
Halimba	V	Veszprém	Ajkai	1,140	8452
Halmaj	V	Borsod-Abaúj-Zemplén	Szikszói	1,912	3842
Halmajugra	V	Heves	Gyöngyösi	2,169	3273
Halogy	V	Vas	Körmendi	311	9917
Hangács	V	Borsod-Abaúj-Zemplén	Edelényi	679	3795
Hangony	V	Borsod-Abaúj-Zemplén	Ózdi	1,782	3626
Hantos	V	Fejér	Sárbogárdi	984	2434
Harasztifalu	V	Vas	Körmendi	181	9784
Harc	V	Tolna	Szekszárdi	898	7172
Harka	V	Gyor-Moson-Sopron	Sopron–Fertodi	1,533	9422
Harkakötöny	V	Bács-Kiskun	Kiskunhalasi	1,002	6136
Harkány	T	Baranya	Siklósi	3,539	7815
Háromfa	V	Somogy	Nagyatádi	862	7585
Háromhuta	V	Borsod-Abaúj-Zemplén	Sárospataki	172	3936
Harsány	V	Borsod-Abaúj-Zemplén	Miskolci	2,107	3555
Hárskút	V	Veszprém	Veszprémi	651	8442
Harta	V	Bács-Kiskun	Kalocsai	3,765	6326
Hásságy	V	Baranya	Mohácsi	294	7745
Hatvan	T	Heves	Hatvani	8,066	3000
Hédervár	V	Gyor-Moson-Sopron	Mosonmagyaróvári	1,117	9178
Hedrehely	V	Somogy	Kaposvári	531	7533
Hegyesd	V	Veszprém	Tapolcai	179	8296
Hegyeshalom	V	Gyor-Moson-Sopron	Mosonmagyaróvári	3,526	9222
Hegyfalu	V	Vas	Csepregi	797	9631
Hegyháthodász	V	Vas	Körmendi	183	9915
Hegyhátmaróc	V	Baranya	Komlói	206	7348
Hegyhátsál	V	Vas	Körmendi	171	9915
Hegyhátszentjakab	V	Vas	Oriszentpéteri	294	9934
Hegyhátszentmárton	V	Vas	Oriszentpéteri	71	9931
Hegyhátszentpéter	V	Vas	Vasvári	183	9821
Hegyko	V	Gyor-Moson-Sopron	Sopron–Fertodi	1,257	9437
Hegymagas	V	Veszprém	Tapolcai	251	8265
Hegymeg	V	Borsod-Abaúj-Zemplén	Edelényi	103	3786
Hegyszentmárton	V	Baranya	Sellyei	436	7837
Héhalom	V	Nógrád	Pásztói	1,047	3041
Hejce	V	Borsod-Abaúj-Zemplén	Abaúj–Hegyközi	303	3892
Hejobába	V	Borsod-Abaúj-Zemplén	Tiszaújvárosi	1,944	3593
Hejokeresztúr	V	Borsod-Abaúj-Zemplén	Tiszaújvárosi	1,077	3597
Hejokürt	V	Borsod-Abaúj-Zemplén	Tiszaújvárosi	340	3588
Hejopapi	V	Borsod-Abaúj-Zemplén	Tiszaújvárosi	1,248	3594
Hejoszalonta	V	Borsod-Abaúj-Zemplén	Tiszaújvárosi	779	3595
Helesfa	V	Baranya	Szentlorinci	568	7683
Helvécia	V	Bács-Kiskun	Kecskeméti	4,055	6034
Hencida	V	Hajdú-Bihar	Berettyóújfalui	1,313	4123
Hencse	V	Somogy	Kaposvári	395	7532
Herceghalom	V	Pest	Budaörsi	1,465	2053
Hercegkút	V	Borsod-Abaúj-Zemplén	Sárospataki	710	3958
Hercegszántó	V	Bács-Kiskun	Bajai	2,275	6525
Heréd	V	Heves	Hatvani	1,396	3011
Héreg	V	Komárom-Esztergom	Tatabányai	1,015	2832
Herencsény	V	Nógrád	Balassagyarmati	730	2677
Herend	T	Veszprém	Veszprémi	3,499	8440
Heresznye	V	Somogy	Barcsi	293	7587
Hermánszeg	V	Szabolcs-Szatmár-Bereg	Fehérgyarmati	285	4735
Hernád	V	Pest	Dabasi	3,618	2376
Hernádbud	V	Borsod-Abaúj-Zemplén	Encsi	164	3853
Hernádcéce	V	Borsod-Abaúj-Zemplén	Abaúj–Hegyközi	242	3887
Hernádkak	V	Borsod-Abaúj-Zemplén	Miskolci	1,559	3563
Hernádkércs	V	Borsod-Abaúj-Zemplén	Szikszói	334	3846
Hernádnémeti	V	Borsod-Abaúj-Zemplén	Miskolci	3,710	3564
Hernádpetri	V	Borsod-Abaúj-Zemplén	Encsi	253	3874
Hernádszentandrás	V	Borsod-Abaúj-Zemplén	Encsi	462	3852
Hernádszurdok	V	Borsod-Abaúj-Zemplén	Abaúj–Hegyközi	224	3875
Hernádvécse	V	Borsod-Abaúj-Zemplén	Encsi	923	3874
Hernyék	V	Zala	Lenti	114	8957
Hét	V	Borsod-Abaúj-Zemplén	Ózdi	562	3655
Hetefejércse	V	Szabolcs-Szatmár-Bereg	Vásárosnaményi	317	4843
Hetes	V	Somogy	Kaposvári	1,148	7432
Hetvehely	V	Baranya	Szentlorinci	497	7681
Hetyefo	V	Veszprém	Sümegi	99	8344
Heves	T	Heves	Hevesi	9,931	3360
Hevesaranyos	V	Heves	Bélapátfalvai	1,702	3322
Hevesvezekény	V	Heves	Hevesi	1,979	3383
Hévíz	T	Zala	Keszthely–Hévízi	4,505	8380
Hévízgyörk	V	Pest	Aszódi	3,043	2192
Hidas	V	Baranya	Pécsváradi	2,289	7696
Hidasnémeti	V	Borsod-Abaúj-Zemplén	Abaúj–Hegyközi	1,200	3876
Hidegkút	V	Veszprém	Veszprémi	419	8247
Hidegség	V	Gyor-Moson-Sopron	Sopron–Fertodi	311	9491
Hidvégardó	V	Borsod-Abaúj-Zemplén	Edelényi	683	3768
Himesháza	V	Baranya	Mohácsi	1,200	7735
Himod	V	Gyor-Moson-Sopron	Kapuvári	701	9362
Hirics	V	Baranya	Sellyei	267	7838
Hiszékeny	V	Zala	Nagykanizsai	1,337	8777
Hobol	V	Baranya	Szigetvári	1,049	7971
Hodász	V	Szabolcs-Szatmár-Bereg	Mátészalkai	3,487	4334
Hódmezővásárhely	city w. county rights	Csongrád	Hódmezővásárhelyi	48,350	6800
Hollád	V	Somogy	Marcali	297	8731
Hollóháza	V	Borsod-Abaúj-Zemplén	Sátoraljaújhelyi	1,029	3999
Hollóko	V	Nógrád	Szécsényi	404	3176
Homokbödöge	V	Veszprém	Pápai	707	8563
Homokkomárom	V	Zala	Nagykanizsai	230	8777
Homokmégy	V	Bács-Kiskun	Kalocsai	1,534	6341
Homokszentgyörgy	V	Somogy	Barcsi	1,235	7537
Homorúd	V	Baranya	Mohácsi	702	7716
Homrogd	V	Borsod-Abaúj-Zemplén	Szikszói	1,034	3812
Hont	V	Nógrád	Balassagyarmati	597	2647
Horpács	V	Nógrád	Rétsági	206	2658
Hort	V	Heves	Hatvani	4,309	3014
Hortobágy	V	Hajdú-Bihar	Balmazújvárosi	1,667	4071
Horváthertelend	V	Baranya	Szigetvári	94	7935
Horvátlövo	V	Vas	Szombathelyi	206	9796
Horvátzsidány	V	Vas	Koszegi	845	9733
Hosszúhetény	V	Baranya	Komlói	3,360	7694
Hosszúpályi	V	Hajdú-Bihar	Derecske–Létavértesi	5,645	4274
Hosszúpereszteg	V	Vas	Sárvári	766	9676
Hosszúvíz	V	Somogy	Marcali	70	8716
Hosszúvölgy	V	Zala	Nagykanizsai	188	8777
Hosztót	V	Veszprém	Sümegi	98	8475
Hottó	V	Zala	Zalaegerszegi	342	8991
Hogyész	V	Tolna	Tamási	3,041	7191
Hövej	V	Gyor-Moson-Sopron	Kapuvári	303	9361
Hugyag	V	Nógrád	Balassagyarmati	911	2672
Hunya	V	Békés	Békési	790	5555
Hunyadfalva	V	Jász-Nagykun-Szolnok	Szolnoki	220	5063
Husztót	V	Baranya	Pécsi	65	7678

== Notes ==
- Cities marked with * have several different post codes, the one here is only the most general one.
