= Bátya =

Bátya Baćin
- Location of Bátya
- Coordinates: 46.4833°N 18.9500°E
- Country: Hungary
- County: Bács-Kiskun

Area
  - Total: 33.86 km^{2} (13.07 sq mi)

Population (2005)
  - Total: 2,239
  - Density: 66.12/km^{2} (171.3/sq mi)
- Time zone: UTC+1 (CET)
  - Summer (DST): UTC+2 (CEST)
- Postal code: 6351
- Area code: 78
- Website: http://www.batya.hu (Hungarian)

Bátya (Croatian: Baćin or Baćino) is a village in Bács-Kiskun county, Hungary.

== Tourism ==
=== Cultural sights ===
- Church
- World War II monument
- Holy Trinity
- Calvaria

=== Other structures ===
Southwest of Bátya, there is the tallest electricity pylon of Hungary ( height: 138 metres). It is part of Danube crossing from the 400 kV-line Paks - Sandorfalva.

== Notable people ==
- Teri Harangozó (1943 - 2015), singer

== Demographics ==
Existing ethnicities:

- (Hungary) Magyars
- (Croatia) Croats

Croats from Bátya came to that area in 16th century from Croatian northeastern region of Slavonia. They speak the Štokavian dialect of Croatian, a Slavonian subdialect (Old-Shtokavian with non-reflected yat pronunciation). Similar dialectal features are seen today among population of Gradište near Županja and around Našice.

These Croats belong to special group of Danubian Croats: they call themselves as Raci. In literature they are also called racki Hrvati.

Bátya Croats' feast is Veliko racko prelo.

== Nearby villages ==
- Kalocsa
- Fajsz
- Foktő
- Miske
- Dusnok
