= Harangozó =

Harangozó or Harangozo is a surname. Notable people with the surname include:

- Gábor Harangozó, Hungarian parliamentarian
- Tamás Harangozó, Hungarian parliamentarian
- Teri Harangozó, Hungarian singer
- Tibor Harangozo, Yugoslav table tennis player
- Vilim Harangozo, Yugoslav table tennis player
