= Kalocsa District =

Coordinates: 46.5833°N 19.0500°E

Kalocsa District Kalocsai járás
- Districts of Hungary
- Coat of arms

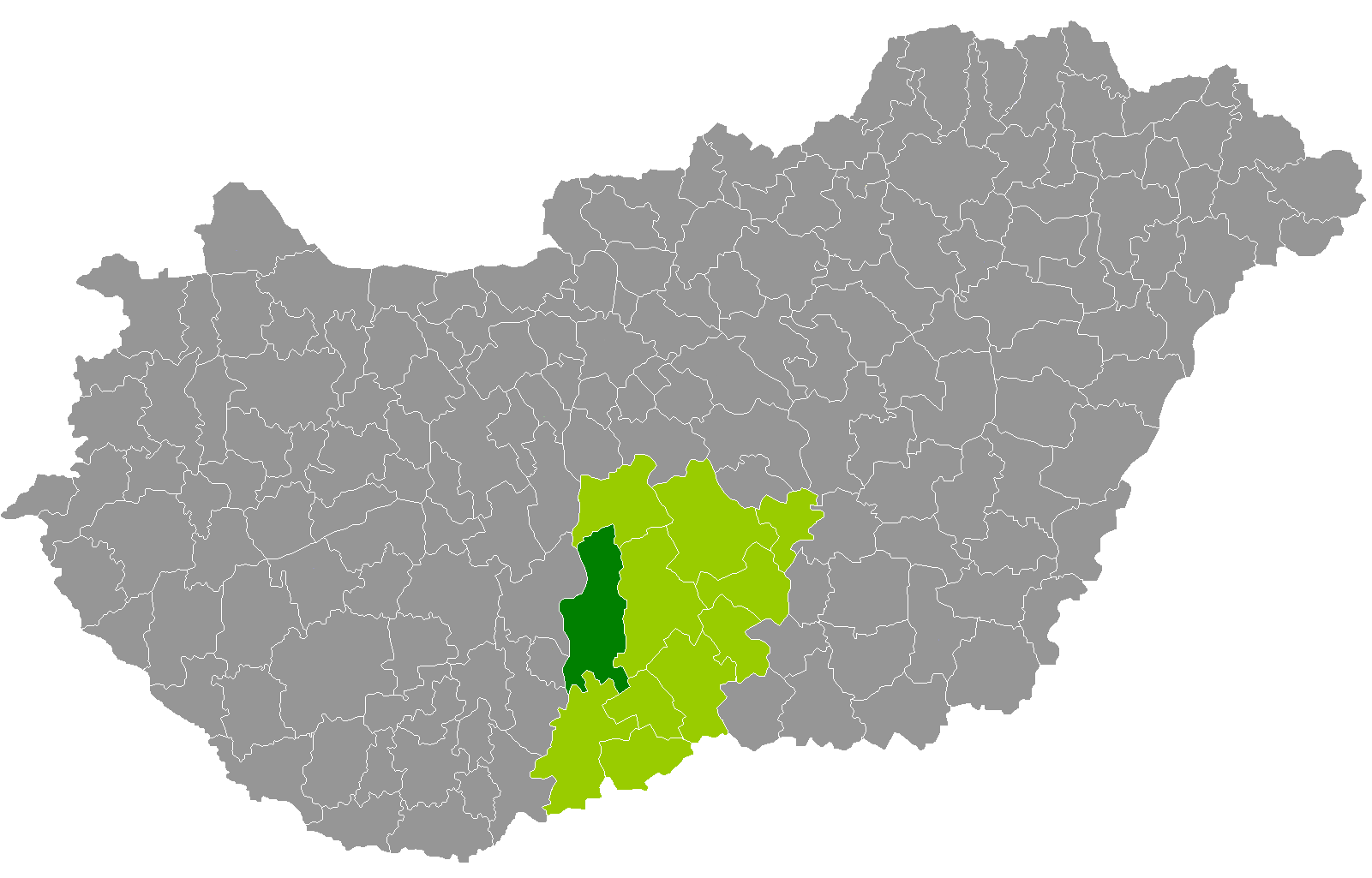
- Kalocsa District within Hungary and Bács-Kiskun County.
- Country: Hungary
- County: Bács-Kiskun
- District seat: Kalocsa

Area
  - Total: 1,062.27 km^{2} (410.14 sq mi)
  - Rank: 3rd in Bács-Kiskun

Population (2011 census)
  - Total: 52,479
  - Rank: 4th in Bács-Kiskun
  - Density: 49/km^{2} (130/sq mi)

Kalocsa (Hungarian: Kalocsai járás; German: Kreis Kollotschau) is a district in western part of Bács-Kiskun County. Kalocsa is also the name of the town where the district seat is found. The district is located in the Southern Great Plain Statistical Region.

== Geography ==
Kalocsa District borders with Kunszentmiklós District to the north, Kiskőrös District to the east, Jánoshalma District to the southeast, Baja District to the south, Tolna District and Paks District (Tolna County) to the west. The number of the inhabited places in Kalocsa District is 21.

== Municipalities ==
The district has 3 towns, 2 large villages and 16 villages. (ordered by population, as of 1 January 2013)

- Bátya (2,060)
- Drágszél (326)
- Dunapataj (3,180)
- Dunaszentbenedek (865)
- Dunatetétlen (529)
- Dusnok (2,958)
- Fajsz (1,712)
- Foktő (1,628)
- Géderlak (1,020)
- **Hajós** (3,115)
- Harta (3,417)
- Homokmégy (1,398)
- **Kalocsa** (16,552) – district seat
- Miske (1,722)
- Ordas (420)
- Öregcsertő (809)
- **Solt** (6,488)
- Szakmár (1,237)
- Uszód (1,056)
- Újsolt (181)
- Újtelek (355)

The bolded municipalities are cities, italics municipalities are large villages.

== Demographics ==
Religion in Kalocsa District (2011 census)
1. Catholic Church (49.1%)
2. Greek Catholicism (0.20%)
3. Calvinism (11.4%)
4. Lutheranism (2.50%)
5. Other religions (1.20%)
6. Non-religious (10.4%)
7. Atheists (0.70%)
8. Undeclared (24.5%)

In 2011, it had a population of 52,497 and the population density was 49/km^{2}.

Year	County population	Change
2011	52,497	n/a

=== Ethnicity ===
Besides Hungarian majority, the main minorities are the German (approx. 3,000), Roma (1,800), Croat (1,000), Slovak and Romanian (100).

Total population (2011 census): 52,497
Ethnic groups (2011 census): Identified themselves: 51,084 persons:

- Hungarians: 44,689 (87.48%)
- Germans: 2,951 (5.78%)
- Gypsies: 1,801 (3.53%)
- Croats: 1,005 (1.97%)
- Others and indefinable: 638 (1.25%)

Approx. 1,500 persons in Kalocsa District did not declare their ethnic group at the 2011 census.

=== Religion ===
Religious adherence in the county according to 2011 census:

- Catholic – 25,901 (Roman Catholic – 25,773; Greek Catholic – 121);
- Reformed – 5,957;
- Evangelical – 1,299;
- other religions – 639;
- Non-religious – 5,484;
- Atheism – 379;
- Undeclared – 12,838.

== Gallery ==
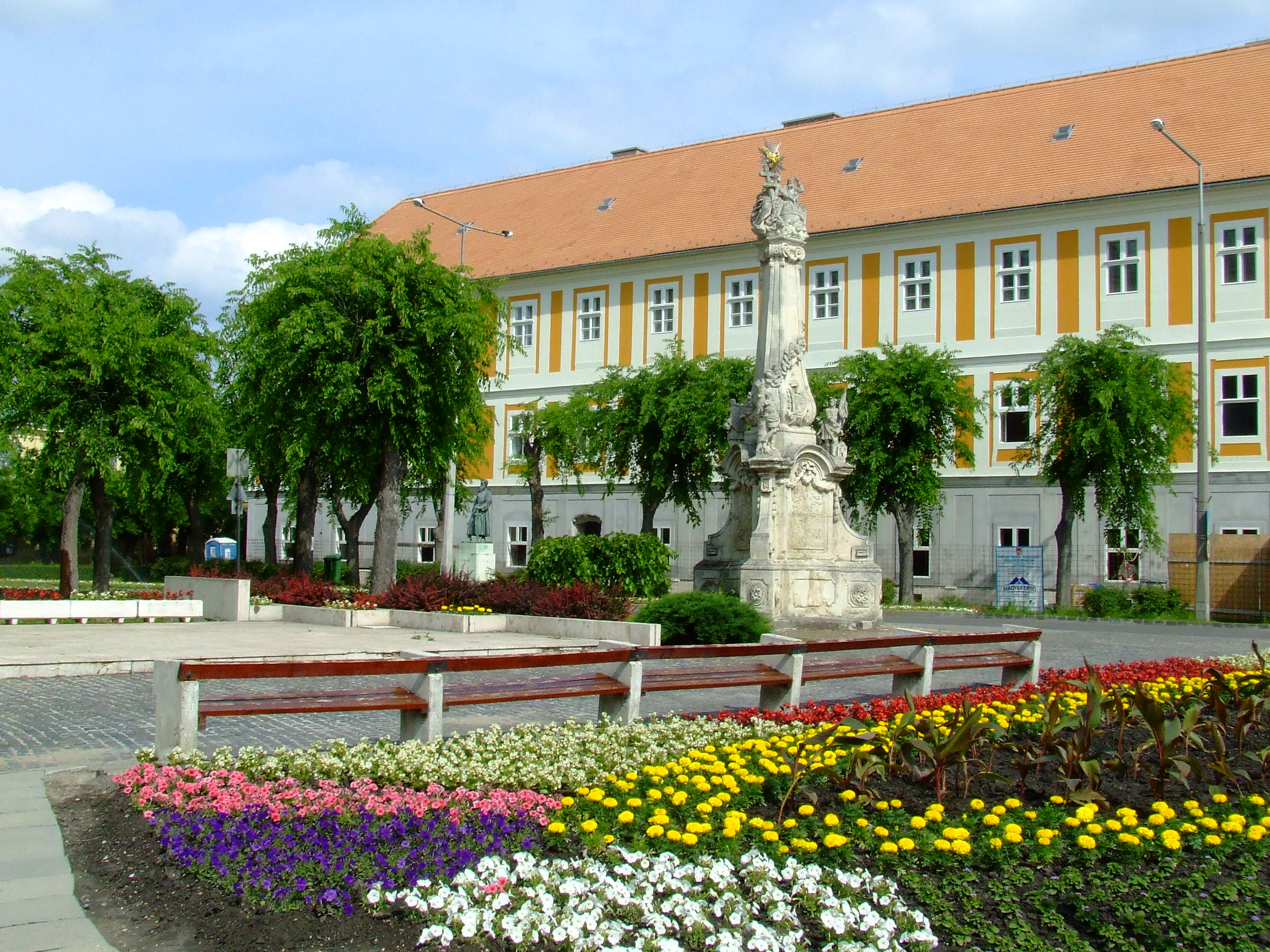
Kalocsa, the district seat

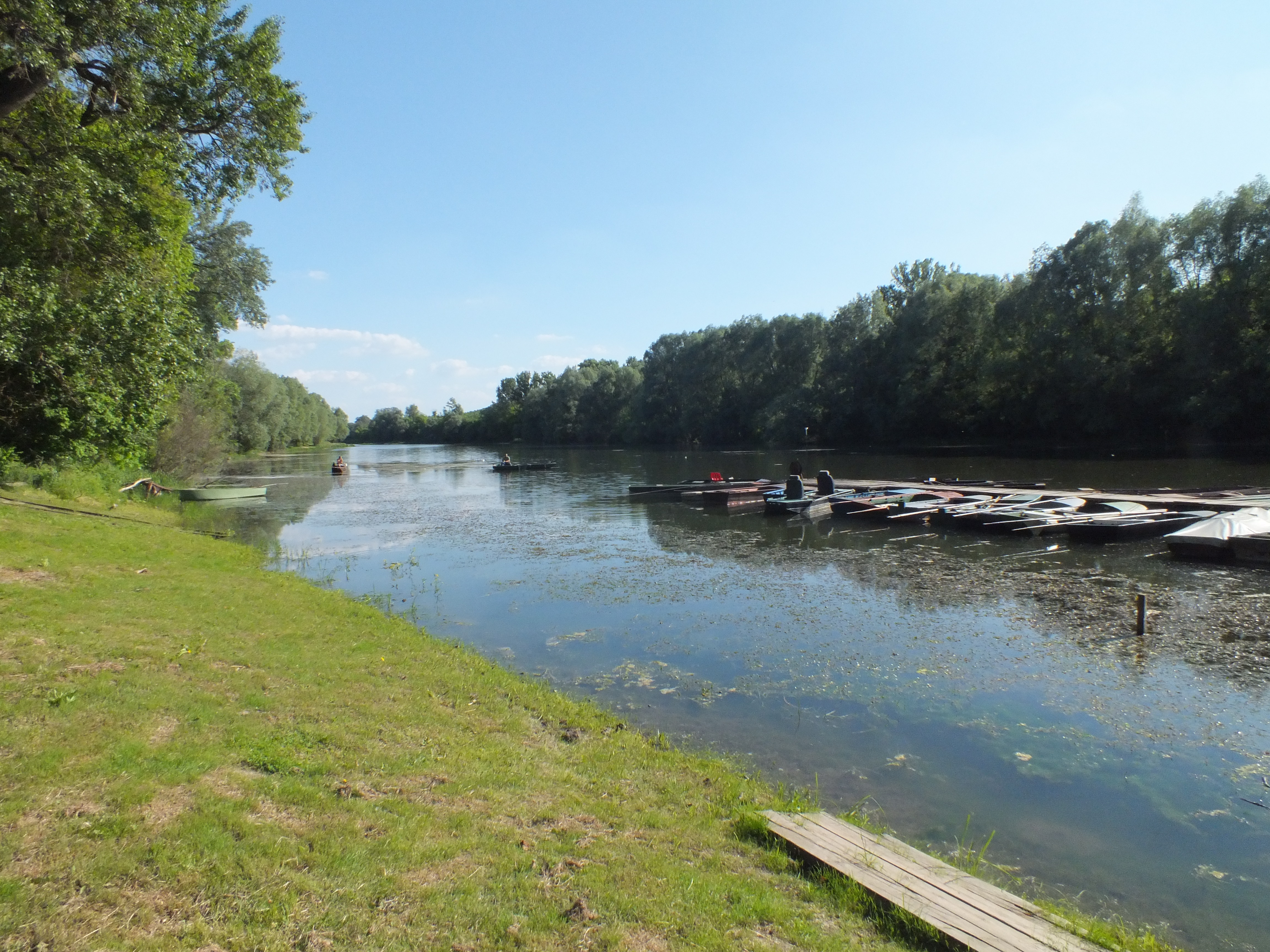
Fishing lake near Solt

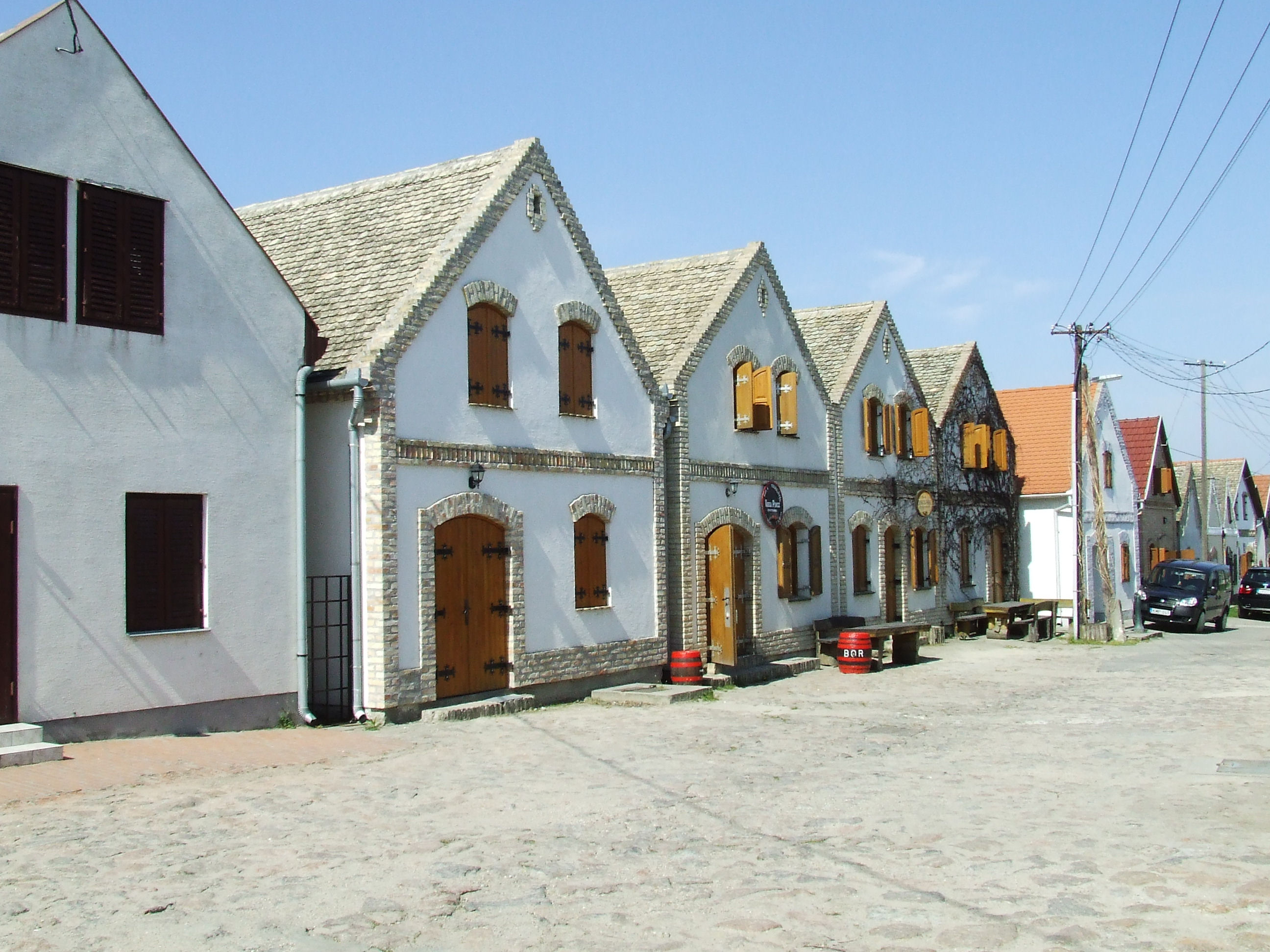
Cellar Village of Hajós

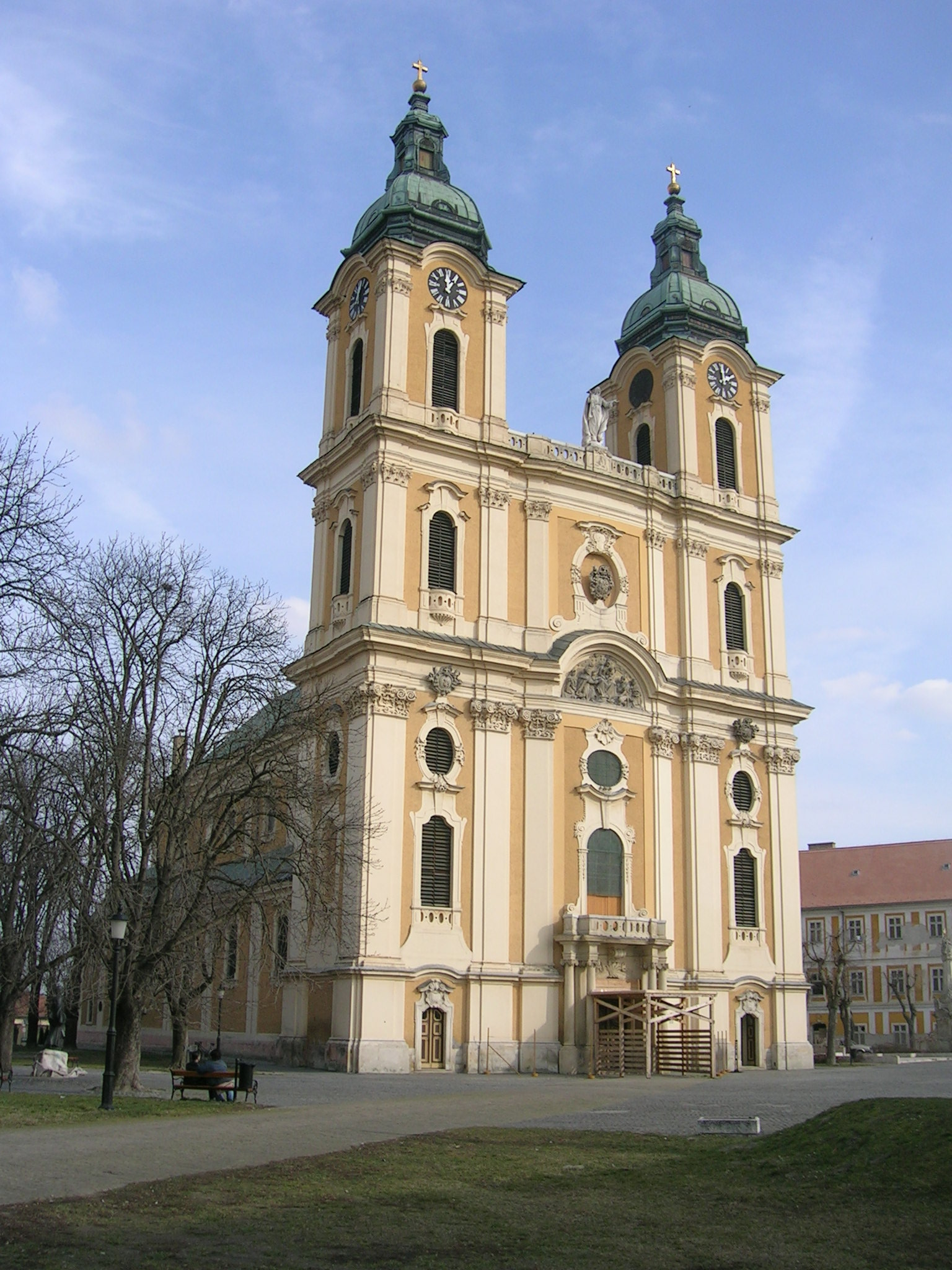
Assumption Cathedral in Kalocsa

== See also ==
- List of cities and towns of Hungary
