= Vendler =

Vendler is a surname. Notable people with the surname include:

- Helen Vendler (1933–2024), American critic of poetry
- Zeno Vendler (1921–2004), Hungarian-born philosopher
