= Drágszél =

- Location of Drágszél
- Coordinates: 46.466°N 19.05°E
- Country: Hungary
- County: Bács-Kiskun

Area
  - Total: 12.59 km^{2} (4.86 sq mi)

Population (2025)
  - Total: 252
- Time zone: UTC+1 (CET)
  - Summer (DST): UTC+2 (CEST)
- Postal code: 6342
- Area code: 78

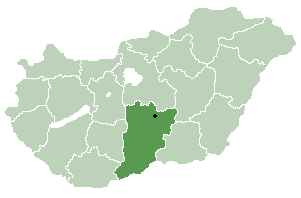
Location of Bács-Kiskun county in Hungary

Drágszél (Croatian: Draga) is a small village in Bács-Kiskun county, in the Southern Great Plain region of Hungary.

== Geography ==
It covers an area of 12.59 km^{2} (5 sq mi) and has a population of 398 people (2002).

== History ==
In 1913, Drágszél had a population of 506. At that time, the village was part of the larger municipality of Homokmégy, which was located in the Kalocsa district of Pest-Pilis-Solt-Kiskun County.
