= Oskar David Ginsberger =

Croatian physician

Dr. med. Oskar David Ginsberger
- Born: Oskar David Günsberger; 2 February 1896; Gradište, Kingdom of Croatia-Slavonia, Austria-Hungary, (now Croatia)
- Died: 1 February 1979 (aged 82); St. Gallen, Switzerland
- Education: University of Graz
- Occupation: Physician
- Parent: Ljudevit Günsberger

Oskar David Ginsberger (2 February 1896 – 1 February 1979) was a Croatian physician (dermatovenerologist) and Partisan member during World War II.

Ginsberger was born in Gradište, in the Kingdom of Croatia-Slavonia on 2 February 1896 to a Jewish family. He finished grammar school in Gradište, and attended gymnasium in Vinkovci and Zagreb. In 1914 Ginsberger graduated from the Faculty of Medicine at the University of Graz. He completed dermatovenereology academic specialization in Vienna, 1922. Upon return to Osijek, he worked as a private physician. During World War II, in 1942, he joined the Partisans as a member of the VII. Banijska brigada (Banovina brigade). After the war he worked at the Sisak community health center. He worked on sexually transmitted diseases and their control. Ginsberger wrote articles which were published in local and western professional medical journals from 1925 to 1965. He translated the book of Jürgen Thorwald "Das Jahrhundert der Chirurgen" and Herbert Franks "Aufstand der Herzen". Ginsberger retired in 1953, but worked privately until 1965. He died in St. Gallen, Switzerland on 1 February 1979.

== Bibliography ==
- Romano, Jaša (1980). Jevreji Jugoslavije 1941-1945: žrtve genocida i učesnici narodnooslobodilačkog rata. Beograd: Jevrejski Istorijski Muzej, Saveza jevrejskih opština Jugoslavije.
