= Korondi =

Korondi is a Hungarian surname. Notable people with the surname include:

- Anna Korondi, singer
- György Korondi (1936–2015), singer, father of Anna Korondi
- Margit Korondi (1932–2022), gymnast
- Miklós Korondi (born 1955), politician
