= Vărșag =

Vărșag Székelyvarság
- Commune
- Location in Harghita County

- Location in Romania
- Coordinates: 46°31′N 25°21′E
- Country: Romania
- County: Harghita

Government
  - Mayor (2020–2024): Ernő Tamás (UDMR)
- Area: 76.69 km^{2} (29.61 sq mi)
- Population (2021-12-01): 1,652
  - Density: 21.54/km^{2} (55.79/sq mi)
- Time zone: UTC+02:00 (EET)
  - Summer (DST): UTC+03:00 (EEST)
- Postal code: 537350
- Area code: +40 266
- Vehicle reg.: HR
- Website: www.varsag.ro

Vărșag (Hungarian: Székelyvarság or colloquially Varság, Hungarian pronunciation: [ˈvɒrʃaːɡ]) is a commune in Harghita County, Romania. It lies in the Székely Land, an ethno-cultural region in eastern Transylvania. It is composed of a single village, Vărșag.

== Geography ==
It is the biggest scattered settlement in the county, its area being 76.69 km^{2}. The main dwellings from south to north are Küküllõ-telep, Bagzos, Nagykút, Sólyomkõ, Központ, Forrásköze, Varság-Tisztása. The village lies on the 850–1050 m high Vărșag volcanic plateau at the feet of the Ghurghiu de Sud Mountain. The only access way into the village is a 13-kilometre-long (8.1 mi) non-asphalted road (138B) which starts at the Zetea storage-lake. The climatic conditions are temperate, with short and fresh summers and long and chilly winters. The most important river is the Tărnava Mare (Nagy-Küküllő) River which rise here. There are a great number of creeks in the area: Tartód, Kiság, Varság, Nagykút, Boros, Köves, Szilidi. Sixty percent of it area is covered in forest with a great biological diversity. Local fauna include rabbits, foxes, bears, wolves, lynxes and a lot of species of birds. During the summer, raspberries, bilberries, blackberries, wild strawberries and several species of mushrooms can be picked. Trout are common in the brooks.

== History ==
The name Varság was first mentioned in 1598. In 1888, it was recorded as Varság-tisztás but the place was not inhabited until the end of the 19th century when summer dwellings for villagers were built here. The first permanent residents were woodworkers, shingle makers from the neighboring Székely villages. It became a commune as late as in 1906 and was called Varságtelep at first. Since 1908, it has been called Székelyvarság in Hungarian. In 1910, it had 1233 Hungarian inhabitants. Until the end of VVI, the village belonged to Udvarhely County in the Kingdom of Hungary.

After the Treaty of Trianon of 1920, the village became part of Romania and fell within Odorhei County during the interwar period. In 1940, the second Vienna Award granted Northern Transylvania to Hungary and the village was held by Hungary until 1944. After Soviet occupation, the Romanian administration returned and the commune became officially part of Romania in 1947. Between 1952 and 1960, the commune fell within the Magyar Autonomous Region, between 1960 and 1968 the Mureș-Magyar Autonomous Region. In 1968, the province was abolished, and since then, the commune has been part of Harghita County.

== Demographics ==
The commune has an absolute Székely Hungarian majority. According to the 2011 census it has a population of 1,572 of which 99.75% or 1,568 are Hungarian.

== Economy ==
The main economical activity is forestry and wood processing, agriculture, stone-cutting and in recent times ecotourism.

== Landmarks ==
- The ruins of the Tartód-castle stand on an 870-metre-high (2,854 ft) peak above the mouth of Tartód Creek. The castle was part of the line of defenses on the border of the Kingdom of Hungary in the 11th and 12th centuries,
- The Roman Catholic church was built between 1902 and 1904 from donation of count Károly Gusztav Majláth, Bishop of Transylvania,
- The Csorgókő Falls and the Jesus-spring are situated 3–4 km from the village center,

== Sister village ==
- Homokmégy (Hungary)
