= Dusnok =

Village in Hungary

Dusnok Dušnok
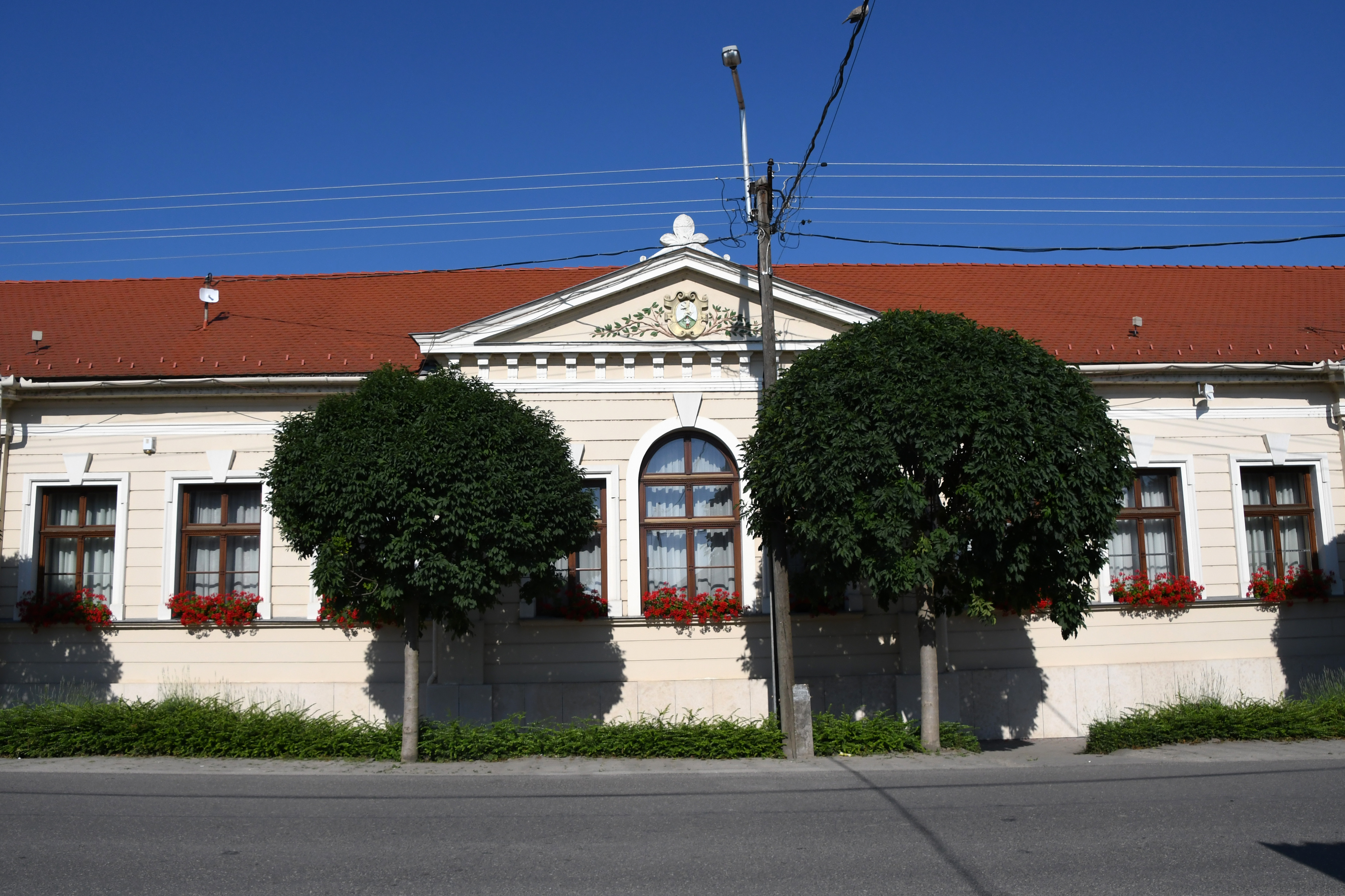
- Town hall

- Flag Coat of arms

- Location of Dusnok Dusnok (Hungary) Dusnok (Europe)
- Coordinates: 46.383°N 18.966°E
- Country: Hungary
- County: Bács-Kiskun
- District: Kalocsa

Area
  - Total: 57.47 km^{2} (22.19 sq mi)

Population (2005)
  - Total: 3,396
  - Density: 59.09/km^{2} (153.0/sq mi)
- Time zone: UTC+1 (CET)
  - Summer (DST): UTC+2 (CEST)
- Postal code: 6353
- Area code: 78

Dusnok (Croatian: Dušnok) is a village in Bács-Kiskun County, in the Southern Great Plain region of southern Hungary.

== Geography ==
It covers an area of 57.47 km^{2} (22 sq mi).

== Demographics ==
It had a population of 3396 people in 2005. Population consists of Magyars, Croats, Germans and Romani.

Croats from Dusnok came to that area in 16th century from Slavonia. They speak the Štokavian dialect of Croatian, a Slavonian subdialect (Old-Shtokavian with non-reflected yat pronunciation). Similar dialectal features are seen today among population of Gradište near Županja (in western Syrmia) and around town of Našice in central eastern Slavonia (both in northeastern Croatia).

These Croats belong to special group of Danubian Croats: they call themselves Raci. In literature they are also called racki Hrvati.

Dusnok Croats' feasts are Veliko racko prelo, Racki Duhovi or Racke Pinkusde (since 1993.), Ivanjdan, August 20, and Berbena svečanost (harvest celebration).

== History ==
Its name was mentioned first in a document issued between 1193 and 1196 by King Béla III. Dusnok was devastated by the Ottoman invasion in the 16th century. In 1639 it was an abandoned place, the property of János Miskey and István Veres. At the end of 17th century Catholic settlers from Dalmatia and Bosnia arrived. In early 18th century Dusnok was reclaimed by the Counts Cseszneky, before becoming the property of the archbishop of Kalocsa. In 1864 the village suffered from a fire.

== Official homepage ==
- (in Hungarian) Dusnok
