= Miklós Korondi =

Hungarian politician

Member of the National Assembly
- In office 14 May 2010 – 5 May 2014

Personal details
- Born: 16 April 1955 (age 70) Szakmár, Hungary
- Party: MSZMP (1982–1987); Jobbik (since 2003)
- Children: 1
- Profession: politician

Miklós Korondi (born 16 April 1955) is a Hungarian politician and a member of parliament between 2010 and 2014.

== Early life ==
Miklós Korondi was born on 16 April 1955 in Szakmár, Bács-Kiskun County. He graduated from I. István Gimnázium of Kalocsa in 1973. From 1973 to 1975 he worked as a teacher in Szakmár and from 1976 he works for Hungarian State Railways. In 1983, he finished studies at Baross Gábor Educational Center of Hungarian State Railways. From 1985 to 1987 he was the stationmaster of Üllő's station and from 1988 to 1997 a traffic expert at the Department in Budapest District of Hungarian State Railways. He made his final exam in 1997 at Budapest University of Technology and Economics and from this year he has been a traffic regulator expert of the company located in the headquarters.

== Political career ==
From 1982 to 1987 he was a member of Hungarian Socialist Workers' Party. On 6 February 2004, he founded the local unit of Jobbik in Cegléd and became the president of this unit. From 2005 he organises Jobbik's campaign in the 15th District of Pest County. In 2006 he was a candidate of MIÉP-Jobbik Third Way coalition and from 1 October 2006 became a municipal representative of Cegléd, the member of Committee on Culture, Education, Youth and Sport and vice-chairman of Sub-committee on Sport. In 2009 he was a candidate of Jobbik in the elections of the European Parliament.

From 2010, he was a member of National Assembly of Hungary and also member of its Committee on Local Government and Regional Development.

== Private life ==
Korondi is married and has a son.
