= Zeno Vendler =

American philosopher of language (1921-2004)

- Born: December 22, 1921; Devecser, Hungary
- Died: January 13, 2004 (aged 82); Hetyefő, Hungary

Philosophical work
- Era: Contemporary philosophy
- Region: Western philosophy
- School: Analytic philosophy
- Main interests: Philosophy of language
- Notable ideas: Verbal aspect

Zeno Vendler (December 22, 1921 – January 13, 2004) was an American philosopher of language, and a founding member and former director of the Department of Philosophy at the University of Calgary. His work on lexical aspect, quantifiers, and nominalization has been influential in the field of linguistics.

== Life ==
Vendler was born in Devecser and raised in Hungary, where he learned to speak both Hungarian and German. He studied there until he began to train as a Jesuit priest in Maastricht. Vendler later went to Harvard University to study philosophy, and earned his doctorate in 1959 with a dissertation titled "Facts and Laws." His participation in a project of Zellig Harris on grammatical transformations introduced him into modern linguistics, and he retained a strong admiration for Harris. After holding several teaching positions at various American universities, he became a professor at the University of Calgary, where he was one of the founding members of the Department of Philosophy. After leaving the University of Calgary in 1973, he taught at several other schools, including Rice University and the University of California, San Diego.

He was married twice—his first wife was poetry critic Helen Hennessy Vendler—and had two sons. Vendler died on 13 January 2004 at the age of 82 in Hetyefő, Veszprém County, Hungary.

== Influence ==
Vendler's 1957 Philosophical Review article "Verbs and times" first introduced a four-way distinction between verbs based on their aspectual features, a distinction that has had a major influence on theories of lexical aspect or aktionsart.

Under Vendler's model, events may be classified into one of four aspectual classes:

- states, which are static and do not have an endpoint ("know," "love");
- activities, which are dynamic and do not have an endpoint ("run," "drive");
- accomplishments, which have an endpoint and are incremental or gradual ("paint a picture," "build a house"); and
- achievements, which have an endpoint and occur instantaneously ("recognize," "notice").

Vendler also popularized the use of the progressive aspect as a diagnostic for distinguishing between these lexical classes; for example, activities and accomplishments are able to appear in the progressive (He is running, He is painting a picture), whereas states and achievements are not (*He is knowing French, *He is recognizing his friend). Vendler's categories are still widely used in current research in areas such as syntax, semantics, and second language acquisition. Linguist S.-Y. Kuroda has said that Vendler's terms achievement and accomplishment "have since become basic technical vocabulary in modern linguistics," and have been used to develop numerous theories and allow for "sophisticated and highly technical" research in a variety of areas.

Vendler's 1967 book Linguistics in Philosophy, a collection of some of his earlier articles, had a large influence on the field of ordinary language philosophy, which attempts to use the study of language and linguistic structures to inform philosophical theory. The book has been called an attempt to "reconcile the empirical basis of linguistic science with the a priori nature of philosophical reasoning." His 1972 Res Cogitans also dealt with the relationship between language and philosophy.

Vendler published over 30 widely cited journal articles and four monographs.

== Books ==
- Zeno Vendler (1967). Linguistics in Philosophy. Ithaca, NY: Cornell University Press. ISBN 0-8014-0436-3.
- Zeno Vendler (1968). Adjectives and Nominalizations. The Hague: Mouton. ISBN 90-279-0083-3.
- Zeno Vendler (1972). Res Cogitans: An Essay in Rational Psychology. Ithaca, NY: Cornell University Press. ISBN 0-8014-0743-5.
- Zeno Vendler (1984). The Matter of Minds. Oxford: Clarendon Press. ISBN 0-19-824431-2.
