= Gábor Harangozó =

Hungarian politician

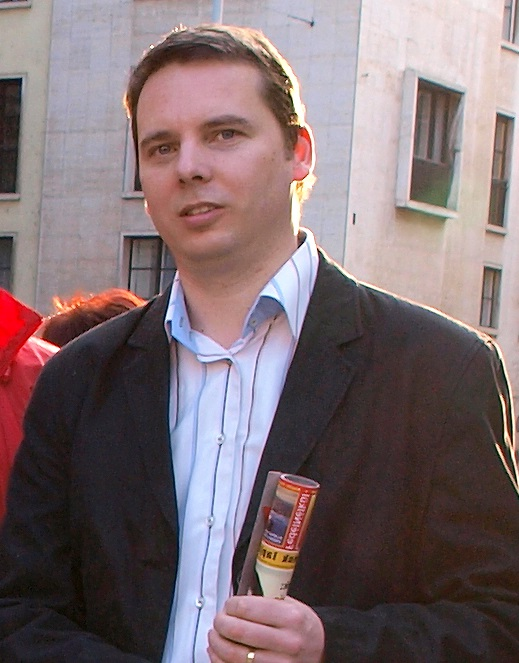
- Born: September 27, 1975 (age 50); Budapest, (Hungary)
- Education: University of West Hungary
- Occupation: politician
- Political party: MSZP
- Spouse: Vanda Harangozóné Tuboly
- Children: Dávid; Sára; Emma

Gábor István Harangozó (born September 27, 1975, in Budapest) is a Hungarian politician and Member of the European Parliament (MEP) for the Hungarian Socialist Party, part of the Party of European Socialists.

Harangozó spent his childhood years in Szekszárd. After completing his secondary education, he enrolled in the University of West Hungary in 1995, where he received a degree in Agribusiness. He then went on to study European Funds Management at CAH Dronten in the Netherlands. From 2002 he represented the German federal state of Baden-Württemberg in Brussels.

He was elected an MEP in the 2004 general elections, and he was the youngest Hungarian MEP then. In 2010 he became a member of the National Assembly of Hungary.

== Personal life ==
He is married. His wife is Vanda Harangozóné Tuboly. They have two daughters, Sára and Emma and a son, Dávid. His younger brother Tamás Harangozó is also a representative in the Hungarian Parliament.
