= Teri Harangozó =

Hungarian singer (1943–2015)

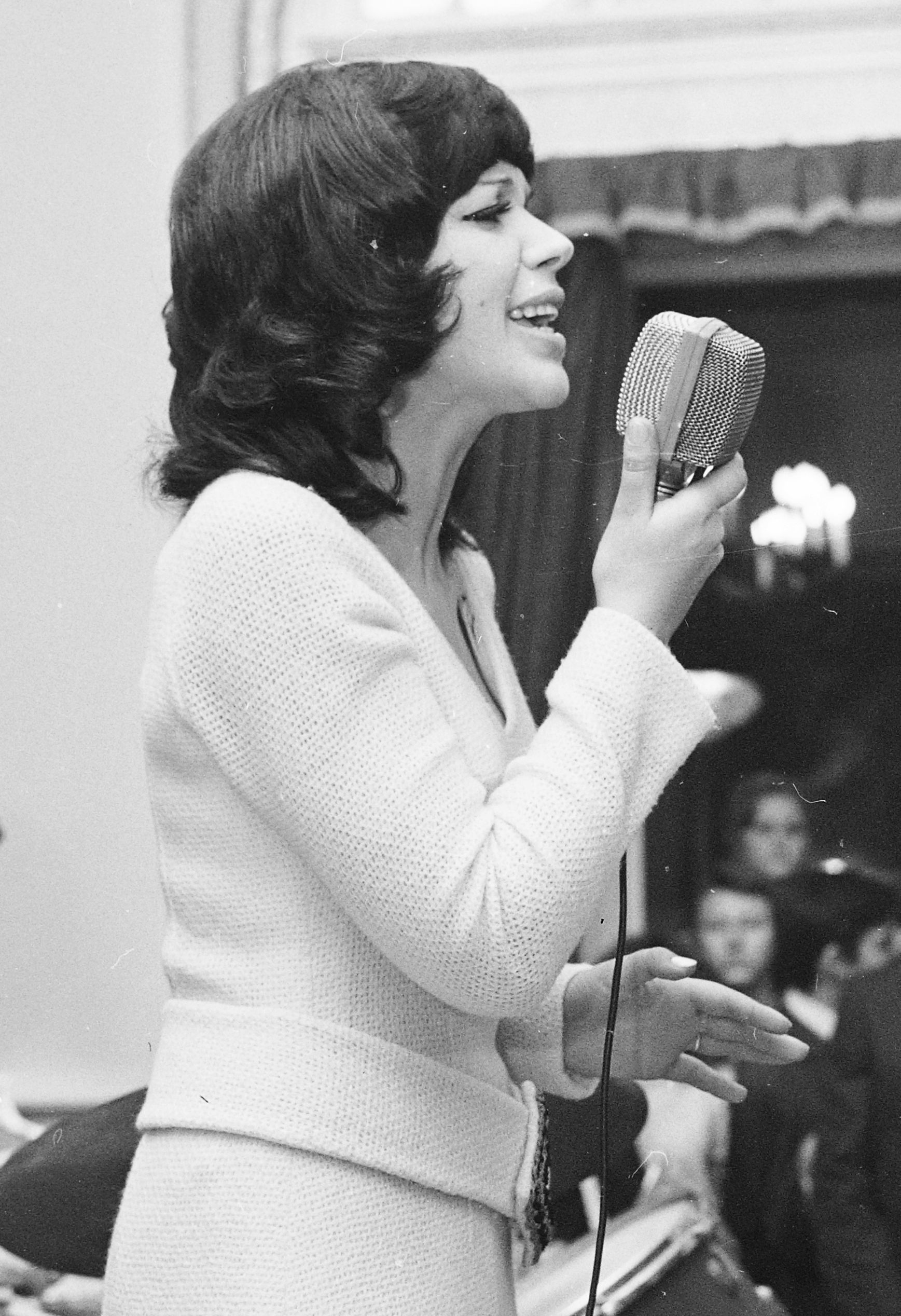
- Teri Harangozó in 1968

Background information
- Born: 8 August 1943; Bátya, Hungary
- Died: 8 September 2015 (aged 72) Budapest, Hungary
- Occupation: Singer
- Instruments: vocals, accordion
- Years active: 1965-2015

Teri Harangozó (born Terézia Mária Rózsa Harangozó 8 August 1943 – 8 September 2015) was a Hungarian singer. She was one of the most influential female artists in Hungary in her time, whose independent album would influence many Hungarian singers after her (Kati Kovács, Zsuzsa Koncz, Sarolta Zalatnay, among others).

== Life and career ==
In 1965, she first appeared on the show Ki mit tud?, then in 1966 became the owner of Hungary's first gold album with the song "Minden ember boldog akar lenni".

She also participated in the Táncdalfesztivál, where in 1968 in and 1969 she reached the second place with the songs "Sose fájjon a fejed" and "Szeretném bejárni a földet". Teri's biggest hit, "Mindenkinek van egy álma", was released in 1968, where she performed it live. She approximately has recorded around a 100 songs appeared that are either singles or on her four independent albums. Abroad, she starred with name Terry Black. In 1970, she sang flower carols with singer Dániel Benkő, accompanied by a lute. In 1990, she also performed at the end of the Sziget Festival.

On 8 September 2015, Harangozó died of a fast lung disease.
