= Hajós =

- Town
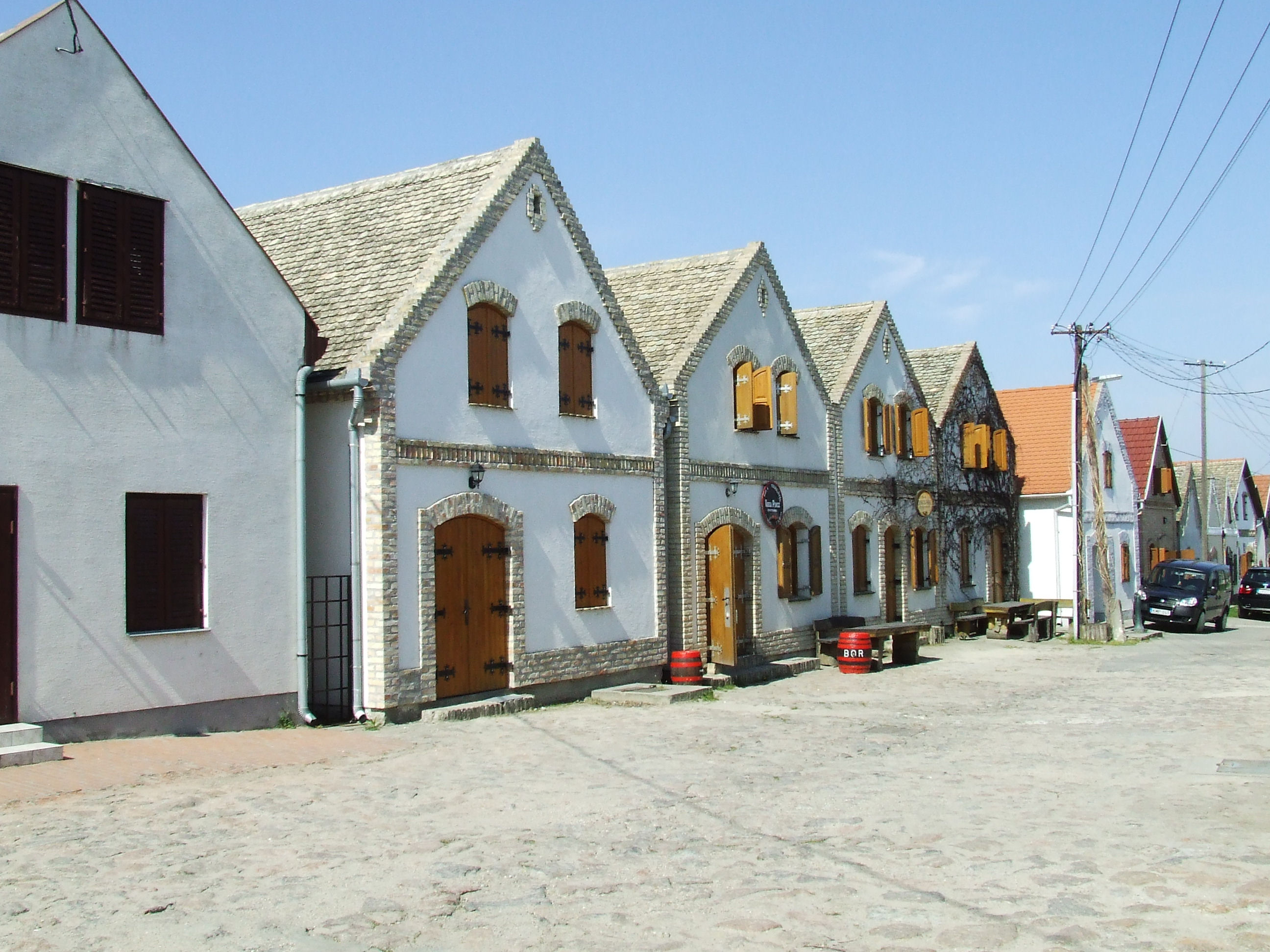
- Wine cellars

- Flag Coat of arms

- Location within Hungary
- Coordinates: 46.399°N 19.120°E
- Country: Hungary
- County: Bács-Kiskun
- District: Kalocsa

Area
  - Total: 89.92 km^{2} (34.72 sq mi)

Population (2008)
  - Total: 3,305
  - Density: 37.64/km^{2} (97.5/sq mi)
- Time zone: UTC+1 (CET)
  - Summer (DST): UTC+2 (CEST)
- Postal code: 6344
- Area code: (+36) 78
- Website: www.hajosvaros.hu

Hajós (Croatian: Ajoš; German: Hajosch) is a town in Bács-Kiskun County, Hungary.

== History ==
Hajós's name comes from the Hungarian word "hajó" which means boat or ship. It is possible that in the Middle Ages Hajós was surrounded by a large area of water. The medieval Hajós lost much of its population during the Ottoman conquest. The Ancestors of the Hajoscher Danube Swabians came in 1720 from different parts of Swabia, and was of entirely Catholic Swabians immigrants origin and settled there and hold until today their own Old Swabian German dialect.

=== Jewish community ===
The Jewish community of Hajós, which numbered around 69 individuals at its peak in 1910, was destroyed during the Holocaust.

At the end of May 1944, the Jews of the entire Kalocsa district, including those from Hajós, were deported to the Kalocsa ghetto. On 17 May, they were transported from the ghetto to the Auschwitz extermination camp.

== Tourism ==
The region features over 1,200 traditional village press houses and wine cellars. It also hosts the annual Urban day wine festival, which attracts tens of thousands of visitors to celebrate Saint Urban, the patron saint of grape growers and wine makers.
