= Miske =

Village in Hungary

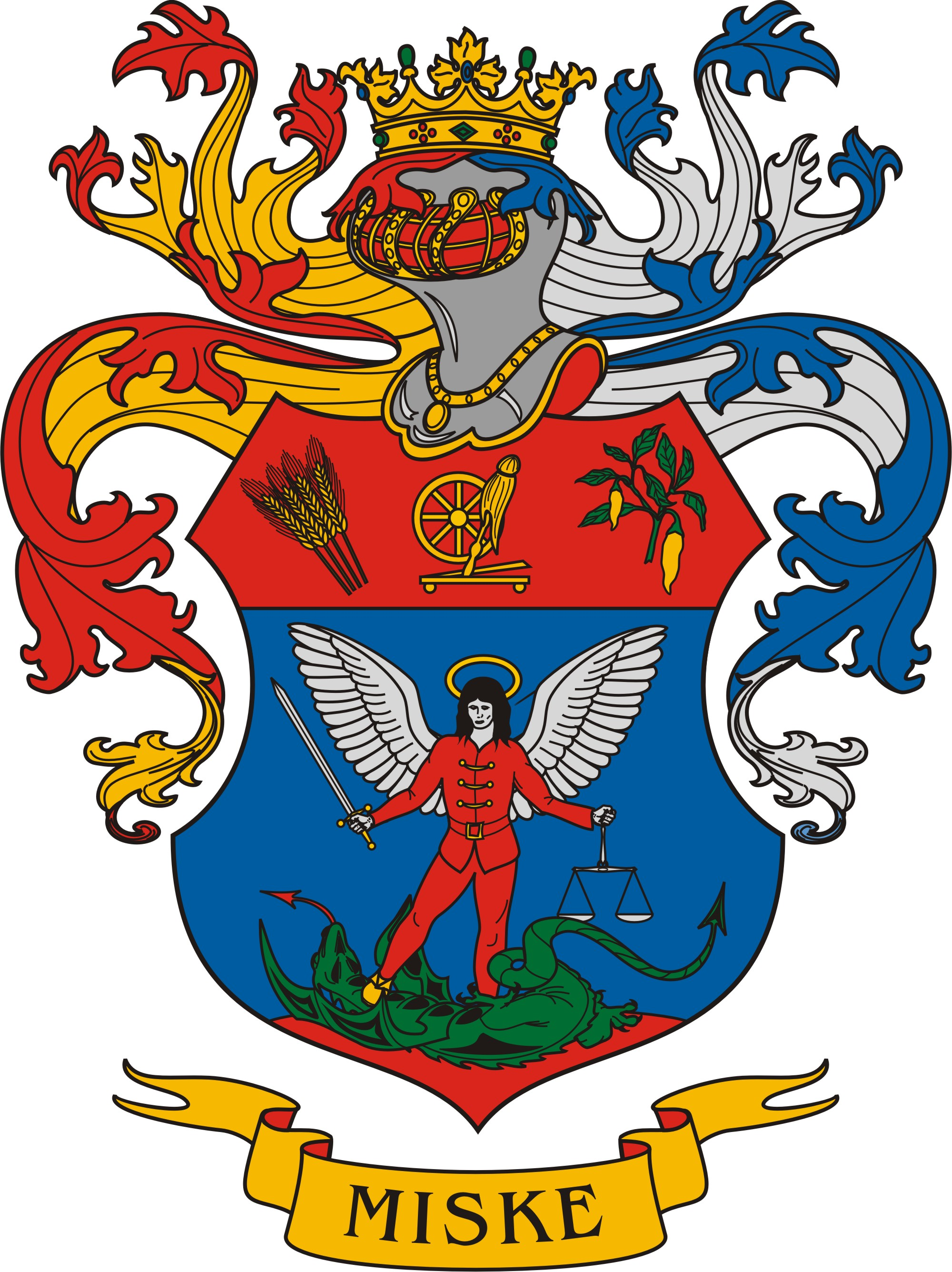
- Flag Coat of arms

- Location of Miske in Hungary Miske (Hungary) Miske (Europe)
- Coordinates: 46°26′N 19°02′E
- Country: Hungary
- County: Bács-Kiskun
- District: Kalocsa

Area
  - Total: 42.27 km^{2} (16.32 sq mi)

Population (2015)
  - Total: 1,632
  - Density: 44/km^{2} (110/sq mi)
- Time zone: UTC+1 (CET)
  - Summer (DST): UTC+2 (CEST)
- Postal code: 6343
- Area code: 78

Miske (Croatian: Miška) is a village in Bács-Kiskun county, in the Southern Great Plain region of southern Hungary.

== Geography ==
It covers an area of 42.27 km^{2} (16 sq mi) and had a population of 1632 people in 2015.

== Sport ==
- Miskei ALC, association football team
