= Hárskút =

Hárskút Lindenbrunn
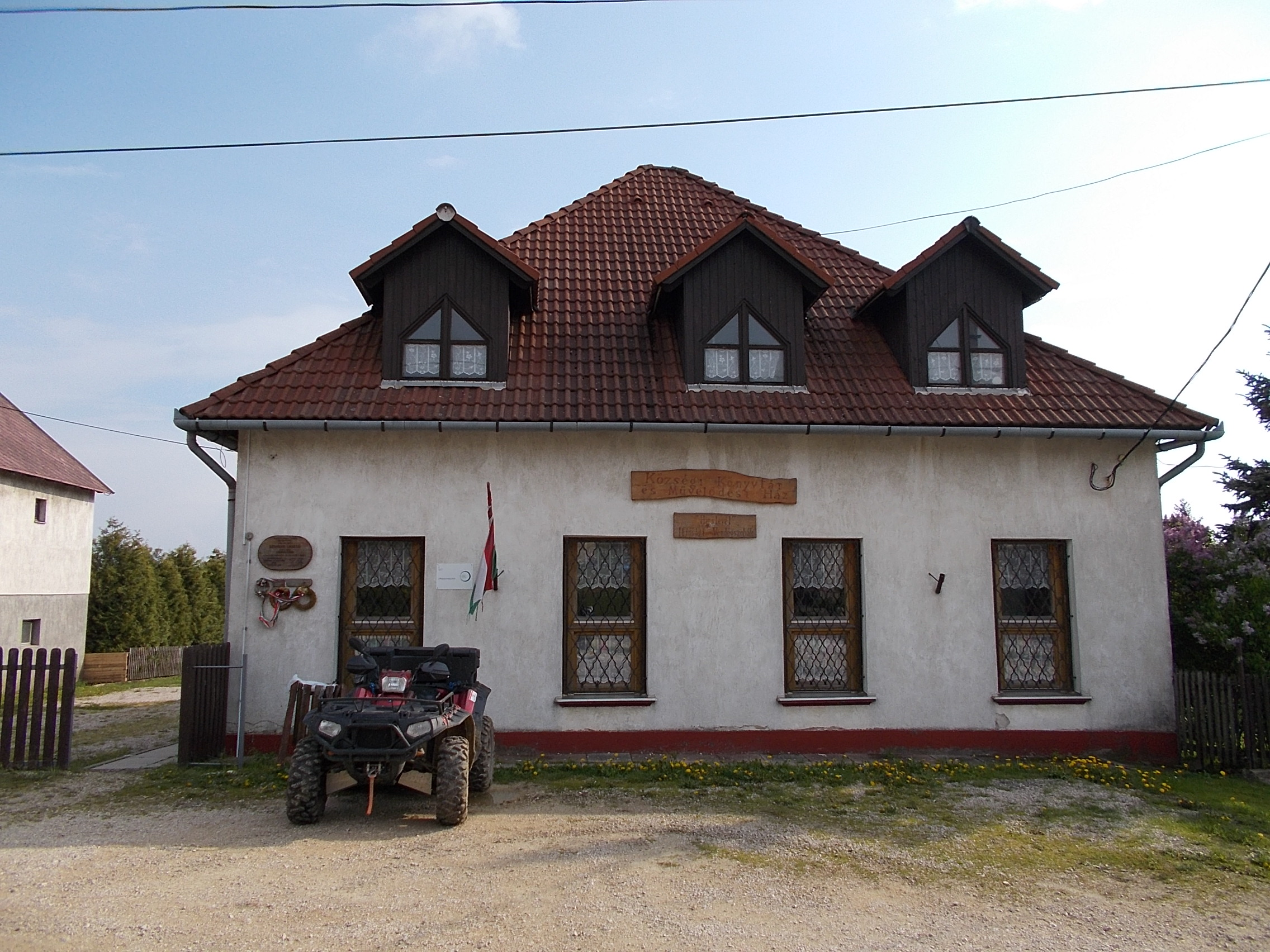
- Community centre

- Location of Veszprém county in Hungary

- Location of Hárskút
- Coordinates: 47.18588°N 17.81391°E
- Country: Hungary
- County: Veszprém

Area
  - Total: 34.46 km^{2} (13.31 sq mi)

Population (2004)
  - Total: 661
  - Density: 19.18/km^{2} (49.7/sq mi)
- Time zone: UTC+1 (CET)
  - Summer (DST): UTC+2 (CEST)
- Postal code: 8442
- Area code: 88

Hárskút (German: Lindenbrunn) is a village in Veszprém County, Hungary.
