= Helen Vendler =

American poetry critic (1933–2024)

- Born: Helen Hennessy; April 30, 1933; Boston, Massachusetts, U.S.
- Died: April 23, 2024 (aged 90); Laguna Niguel, California, U.S.
- Occupation: Professor
- Spouse: Zeno Vendler (m. 1960; div. 1963)
- Children: 1
- Awards: Fulbright Scholarship, 1954 James Russell Lowell Prize of the Modern Language Association (MLA), 1969 American Council of Learned Societies Fellowship, 1970 Metcalf Cup & Prize, Boston University, 1975 National Book Critics Circle Award for Criticism, 1980 Truman Capote Award for Literary Criticism, Iowa Writers' Workshop, at the University of Iowa, 1996 Charles Homer Haskins Lecture, American Council of Learned Societies, 2001 Jefferson Lecture in the Humanities, National Endowment for the Humanities, 2004 Don M. Randel Award for Humanistic Studies, American Academy of Arts and Sciences, 2013 Gold Medal for Belles Lettres and Criticism from the American Academy of Arts and Letters, 2023

Academic background
- Education: Emmanuel College (AB); Harvard University (PhD)

Academic work
- Discipline: English
- Sub-discipline: Poetics
- Institutions: Harvard University; Boston University; Cornell University; Swarthmore College; Smith College
- Main interests: Emily Dickinson, George Herbert, John Keats, Seamus Heaney, Wallace Stevens, W. B. Yeats, William Shakespeare

Helen Vendler (née Hennessy; April 30, 1933 – April 23, 2024) was an American academic, writer and literary critic. She was a professor of English language and history at Boston University, Cornell, Harvard, and other universities.

Her academic focus was critical analysis of poetry and she studied poets from Shakespeare and George Herbert to modern poets such as Wallace Stevens and Seamus Heaney. Her technique was close reading, which she described as "reading from the point of view of a writer".

Vendler reviewed poetry regularly for periodicals including The New Yorker and The New York Review of Books. She was also a regular judge for the National Book Award and Pulitzer Prize and so was influential in determining writers' reputation and success.

== Life and career ==
Helen Hennessy was born on April 30, 1933, in Boston, Massachusetts, to George Hennessy and Helen née Newman Hennessy. She was the second of three children. Her parents encouraged her to read poems as a child. Vendler's father taught Spanish, French, and Italian at a high school, while her mother had taught in a primary school before marriage. Vendler attended Emmanuel College over the Boston Girls' Latin School and Radcliffe College because her parents would not let her enroll in "secular education". She received an A.B. from Emmanuel, majoring in chemistry.

In 1954, Vendler was awarded a Fulbright Fellowship for mathematics at the Université catholique de Louvain but, while traveling to the university, she decided that she would rather study English than math, and the Fulbright commission allowed her to switch her focus to literature. Upon returning to the U.S., Vendler took 12 undergraduate courses in English at Boston University in a year. In 1956, she enrolled at Harvard University as a graduate student in English. She recalled that the department's chair told her within a week of entry that "we don't want any women here", while Perry Miller refused to admit her to a seminar he led on Herman Melville despite viewing her as his "finest student". Other Harvard professors offered her more support, notably I. A. Richards. Vendler was offered a job teaching in Harvard's English department in 1959, making her the first woman the department offered a job as an instructor. She declined.

Vendler graduated with a Ph.D. in English and American literature the next year. She began teaching English at Cornell University in 1960, after her husband at the time, Zeno Vendler, moved to teach there. She left Cornell in 1963 and spent several years at various other institutions, including a year (1963–64) teaching at Haverford College and Swarthmore College, two years (1964–66) as an assistant professor at Boston University, and another two (1966–68) as full professor. Vendler spent a year as a Fulbright Lecturer at the University of Bordeaux. After that, she was Boston University's director of graduate studies in the English department from 1970 to 1975 and again from 1978 to 1979.

Vendler was a professor of English at Harvard University from 1984 until her death; from 1981 to 1984 she taught alternating semesters at Harvard and Boston University. She has said that she retained her affiliation with BU for several years to ensure that she wasn't "some little token person" at Harvard. In 1985, Vendler was named the William R. Kenan Professor of English and American Literature and Language. From 1987 to 1992, she served as associate dean of arts and sciences. In 1990, she was appointed the A. Kingsley Porter University Professor. In 1992, Vendler received an honorary Litt. D. from Bates College. She was a Charles Stewart Parnell fellow at Magdalene College, Cambridge, in 1995, and was elected an Honorary Fellow of Magdalene in 1997.

Vendler delivered the 2000 Warton Lecture on English Poetry. In 2004, the National Endowment for the Humanities selected her for the Jefferson Lecture, the federal government's highest honor for achievement in the humanities. Her lecture, "The Ocean, the Bird, and the Scholar", used poems by Wallace Stevens to argue for the role of the arts (as opposed to history and philosophy) in the study of humanities. In 2006, The New York Times called Vendler "the leading poetry critic in America" and credited her work with helping "establish or secure the reputations" of poets including Jorie Graham, Seamus Heaney, and Rita Dove.

Vendler wrote books on Emily Dickinson, W. B. Yeats, Wallace Stevens, John Keats, and Seamus Heaney. She was a member of the Norwegian Academy of Science and Letters, the American Academy of Arts and Sciences, and the American Philosophical Society. She was also a judge for the Pulitzer Prize for Poetry (1974, 1976, 1978, 1986) and the National Book Award for Poetry (1972).

Vendler received a 2025 Reginald Martin Award for Excellence in Criticism from PEN Oakland.

== Personal life and death ==
Helen Vendler was married to Zeno Vendler from 1960 to 1963; the couple had one child.

Vendler died at her home in Laguna Niguel, California, on April 23, 2024, at the age of 90.

== Publications ==
- Yeats's Vision and the Later Plays (1963)
- On Extended Wings: Wallace Stevens' Longer Poems, ISBN 9780674634367 (1969)
- I. A. Richards: Essays in His Honor (1973) editor with Reuben Brower and John Hollander
- The Poetry of George Herbert, ISBN 9780674679597 (1975)
- Part of Nature, Part of Us: Modern American Poets, ISBN 9780674654761 (1980)
- "What We have Loved, Others Will Love" (1980)
- Modern American Poets (1981)
- The Odes of John Keats, ISBN 9780674630765 (1983)
- The Harvard Book of Contemporary American Poetry (1985), editor
- Wallace Stevens: Words Chosen out of Desire, ISBN 9780674945753 (1986)
- The Faber Book of Contemporary American Poetry (1987)
- Voices and Visions: The Poet in America (1987)
- The Music of What Happens: Poems, Poets, Critics, ISBN 9780674591530 (1988)
- Poems by W. B. Yeats (1990)
- Stevens: Poems ISBN 9780679429111 (1993)
- The Given and the Made: Strategies of Poetic Redefinition, ISBN 9780674354326 (1995)
- Herman Melville: Selected Poems (1995), editor
- John Keats, 1795–1995: With a Catalogue of the Harvard Keats Collection, ISBN 9780914630173 (1995) with Leslie A. Morris and William H. Bond
- The Breaking of Style: Hopkins, Heaney, Graham, ISBN 9780674081215 (1995)
- The Given and the Made: Strategies of Poetic Redefinition (1995)
- Soul Says: On Recent Poetry, ISBN 9780674821477 (1996) essays
- The Art of Shakespeare's Sonnets, ISBN 9780674637122 (1997)
- Seamus Heaney, ISBN 9780674637122 (1998)
- Poems, Poets, Poetry: An Introduction and Anthology (2002)
- Anthology of Contemporary American Poetry (2003), editor
- Coming of Age as a Poet: Milton, Keats, Eliot, Plath ISBN 9780674013834 (2003)
- Poets Thinking: Pope, Whitman, Dickinson, Yeats, ISBN 9780674021105 (2004)
- Invisible Listeners: Lyric Intimacy in Herbert, Whitman, and Ashbery (2005)
- Our Secret Discipline: Yeats and Lyric Form, ISBN 9780674026957 (2007)
- Last Looks, Last Books: Stevens, Plath, Lowell, Bishop, Merrill (2010)
- Dickinson: Selected Poems and Commentaries ISBN 9780674066380 (2010)
- The Ocean, the Bird, and the Scholar: Essays on Poets and Poetry (2015)
