= Hidegkút =

- Flag Coat of arms

- Location of Veszprém county in Hungary

- Location of Hidegkút
- Coordinates: 47.00312°N 17.82645°E
- Country: Hungary
- County: Veszprém

Area
  - Total: 13.58 km^{2} (5.24 sq mi)

Population (2004)
  - Total: 434
  - Density: 31.95/km^{2} (82.8/sq mi)
- Time zone: UTC+1 (CET)
  - Summer (DST): UTC+2 (CEST)
- Postal code: 8247
- Area code: 88

Hidegkút is a village in Veszprém county, Hungary.
