= Fajsz, Hungary =

Village in Bács-Kiskun, Hungary

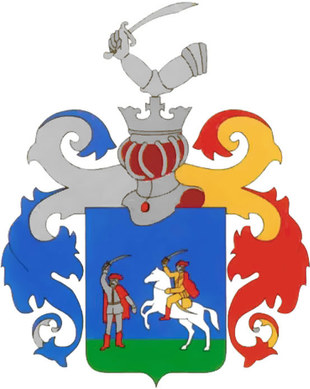
- Coat of arms

- Location of Fajsz
- Coordinates: 46°25′N 18°55′E
- Country: Hungary
- County: Bács-Kiskun
- District: Kalocsa

Area
  - Total: 31.99 km^{2} (12.35 sq mi)

Population (2015)
  - Total: 1,687
  - Density: 52.7/km^{2} (136/sq mi)
- Time zone: UTC+1 (CET)
  - Summer (DST): UTC+2 (CEST)
- Postal code: 6352
- Area code: 78

Fajsz (Croatian: Fajsin) is a village in Bács-Kiskun county, in the Southern Great Plain region of Hungary.

== Geography ==
It covers an area of 31.99 km^{2} (12 sq mi) and had a population of 1687 people as of 2015.

== Twin towns ==
- Trun, France.
