= Harta, Hungary =

Harta Hartau
- Large village
- Coat of arms

- Location of Harta
- Coordinates: 46.693°N 19.031°E
- Country: Hungary
- County: Bács-Kiskun
- District: Kalocsa

Area
  - Total: 129.68 km^{2} (50.07 sq mi)

Population (2001)
  - Total: 3,758
  - Density: 29/km^{2} (75/sq mi)
- Time zone: UTC+1 (CET)
  - Summer (DST): UTC+2 (CEST)
- Postal code: 6326
- Area code: (+36) 78

Harta (German: Hartau; Croatian: Hartava or Karta) is a village in Bács-Kiskun county, Hungary.

== Demography ==
- Magyars
- Germans
