= Foktő =

Village in Bács-Kiskun, Hungary

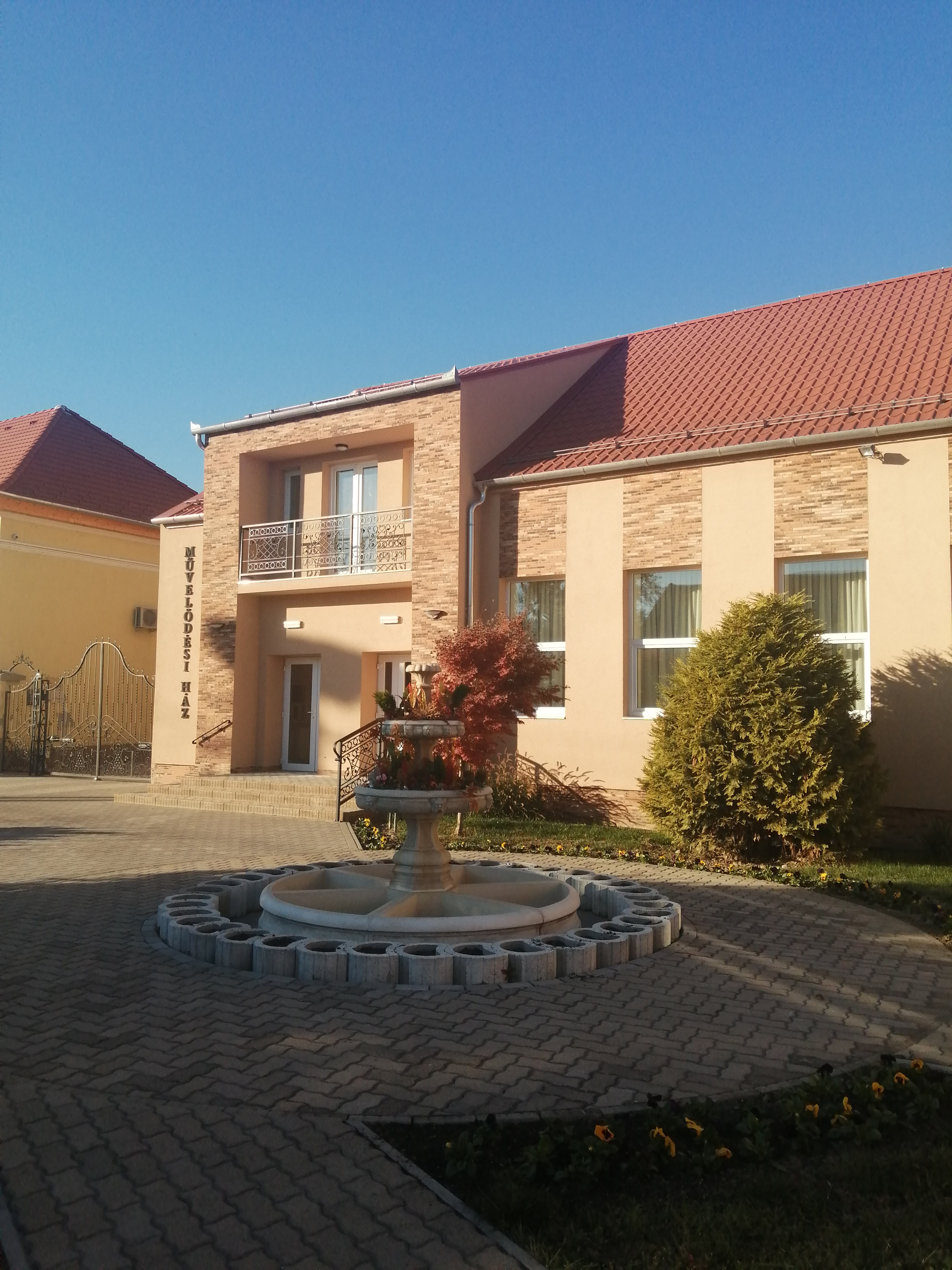
- Town hall

- Flag Coat of arms

- Location of Foktő Foktő (Hungary) Foktő (Europe)
- Coordinates: 46°31′N 18°55′E
- Country: Hungary
- County: Bács-Kiskun
- District: Kalocsa

Area
  - Total: 31.53 km^{2} (12.17 sq mi)

Population (2015)
  - Total: 1,590
  - Density: 53.79/km^{2} (139.3/sq mi)
- Time zone: UTC+1 (CET)
  - Summer (DST): UTC+2 (CEST)
- Postal code: 6331
- Area code: 78

Foktő (Croatian: Voktov) is a village in Bács-Kiskun county, in the Southern Great Plain region of Hungary.

== Geography ==
It covers an area of 31.53 km^{2} (12 sq mi) and had a population of 1590 people as of 2015.
