= Hosztót =

- Coat of arms

- Location of Veszprém county in Hungary

- Location of Hosztót
- Coordinates: 47.08559°N 17.24140°E
- Country: Hungary
- County: Veszprém

Area
  - Total: 7.27 km^{2} (2.81 sq mi)

Population (2004)
  - Total: 98
  - Density: 13.48/km^{2} (34.9/sq mi)
- Time zone: UTC+1 (CET)
  - Summer (DST): UTC+2 (CEST)
- Postal code: 8475
- Area code: 87

Hosztót is a village in Veszprém county, Hungary.
