= CAH Dronten =

Agricultural school in the Netherlands

Coordinates: 52°31′39″N 5°41′54″E

CAH Vilentum University of Applied Sciences is a professional university situated in the centre of the Netherlands - in one of the most modern food production areas in the world.

== History ==
The university was established in 1957 in Ede to provide agricultural education at both diploma and degree levels. In 1968 the university moved to Dronten.

Since then, the university has expanded its programming beyond primary production to include other aspects of the food chain and environment. Total enrollment in 2012 was approximately 1600 students, with 80 faculty.

The main campus - CAH Dronten University of Applied Sciences - is just outside the city of Dronten; in 2010, a second campus was opened in the Dutch city of Almere. Studies at CAH Almere University of Applied Sciences focus on urban and rural development, including urban food production.

== Programs ==
CAH Vilentum University offers a number of degree specializations taught in Dutch. In the last several years, it has expanded its programming taught in English – in most cases with partner universities in Europe.

Programs taught in Dutch include two-year associate degrees and four-year bachelor's degrees. Areas of specialization include the following:

agricultural entrepreneur agricultural engineering and management biology and health animal care financial agriculture green business administration equestrian business administration management of outdoor industries nature, economy and environment applied biology horticulture and agriculture nutrition and health Programs taught in English include 1-year honours degrees, 1.5 year articulated degree programs, and 1-year and 2-year master's degrees (in addition to the four year IFB program).

== Areas of specialization ==
Specializations include the following: Master in agri-business development – 12-month program integrated with corporate placement.

Master of Science in rural development and nature – 2-year program offered jointly with the University of Corvinus in Hungary.

Master of Science in entrepreneurship – 2-year program offered jointly with Warsaw University of Life Sciences in Poland.

Master of Science in livestock science – 2-year program offered jointly with Vila Real in Portugal.

Bachelor's degree in management and agribusiness – four-year articulated degree with École Supérieure d’Agriculture d’Angers in France. Majors include international agri-business, animal production, equine business management, and plant production and horticulture.

Bachelor's degree (1year honors degree after completion of equivalent of 3-year degree) – majors in food safety management, international horticultural management, food chain management, EU structural funds management, international livestock production, rural innovation and development, and animal health and welfare.
