= Hagyárosbörönd =

Coordinates: 46°54′N 16°43′E

- Village
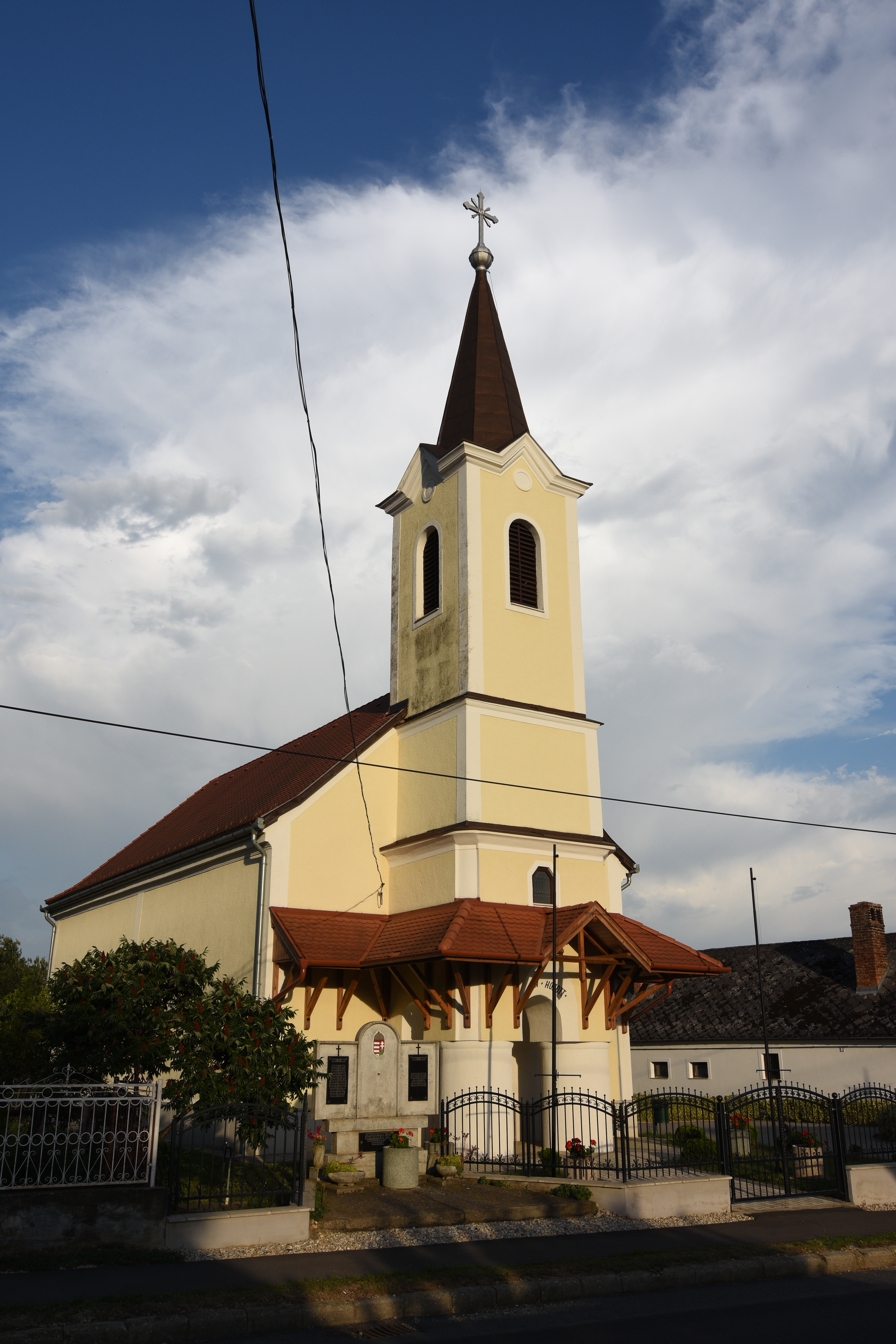
- Kirche Hagyárosbörönd Zala
- Interactive map of Hagyárosbörönd
- Country: Hungary
- Region: Western Transdanubia
- County: Zala County
- Time zone: UTC+1 (CET)
  - Summer (DST): UTC+2 (CEST)

Hagyárosbörönd is a village in Zala County, Hungary.
