= Tamás Harangozó =

Hungarian jurist and politician

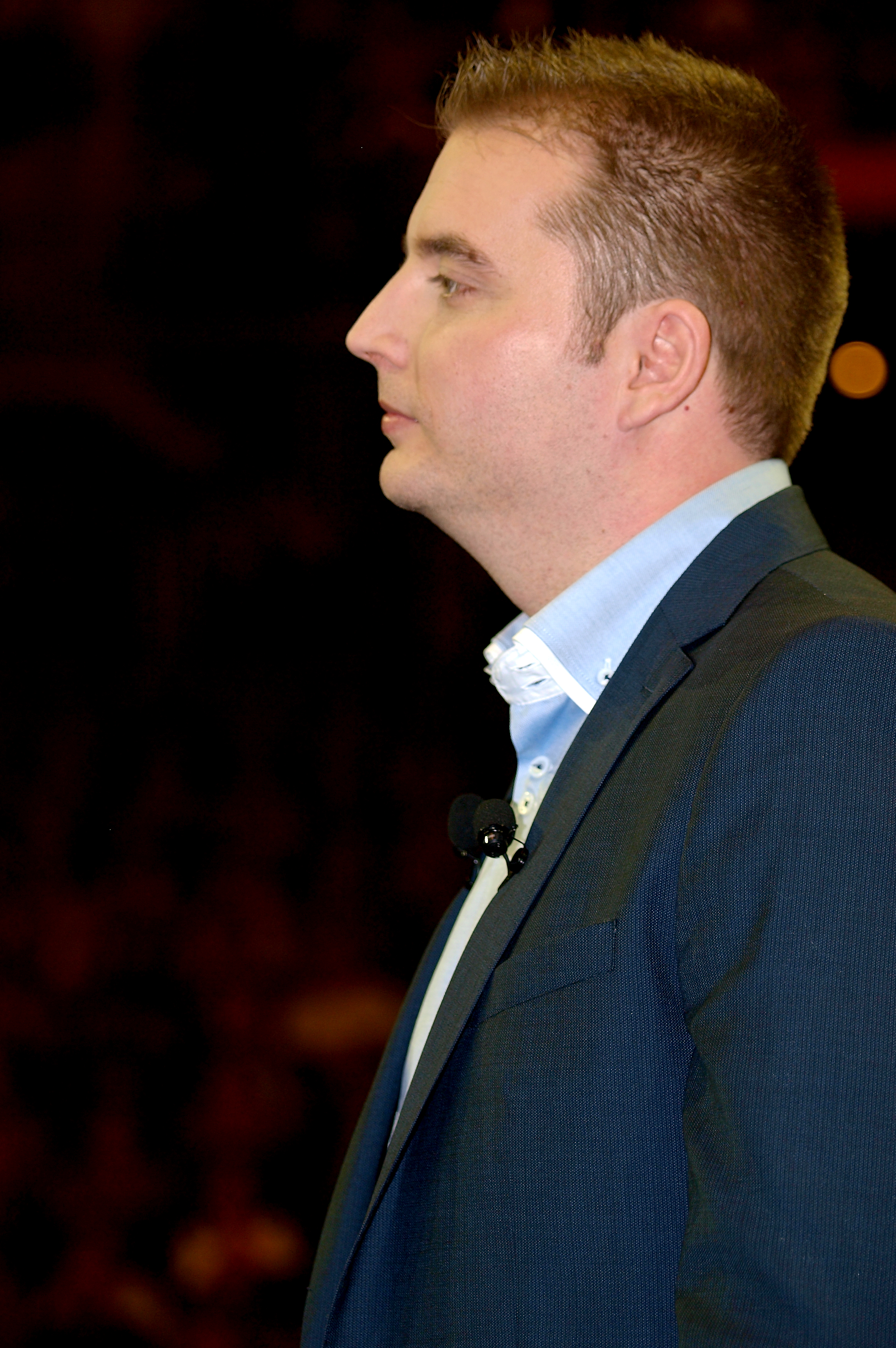

Member of the National Assembly
- Incumbent
- Assumed office 14 May 2010

Personal details
- Born: 27 June 1979 (age 47) Dunaújváros, Hungary
- Party: MSZP
- Parent(s): Dr Ferenc Harangozó; Dr Katalin Rózsa
- Profession: jurist, politician

Tamás Harangozó (born 27 June 1979) is a Hungarian jurist and politician, member of the National Assembly from the Hungarian Socialist Party's Tolna County Regional List since 2010. His brother is Gábor Harangozó another MP from the Socialist Party.

Harangozó was a member of the Constitutional, Judicial and Standing Orders Committee between 14 May 2010 and 14 November 2011. He was appointed a member of the Defence and Internal Security Committee on 17 May 2010 and Committee on National Security on 14 November 2011.

== Personal life ==
He is married.
