= Szakmár =

Coordinates: 46°33′N 19°04′E

- Interactive map of Szakmár
- Country: Hungary
- County: Bács-Kiskun

Area
  - Total: 74.64 km^{2} (28.82 sq mi)

Population (2015)
  - Total: 1,194
  - Density: 16/km^{2} (41/sq mi)
- Time zone: UTC+1 (CET)
  - Summer (DST): UTC+2 (CEST)
- Postal code: 6336
- Area code: 78

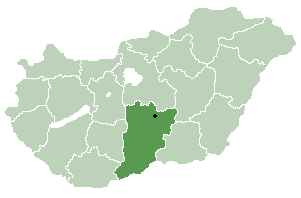
Location of Bács-Kiskun county in Hungary

Szakmár (Croatian: Kmara) is a village in Bács-Kiskun county, in the Southern Great Plain region of southern Hungary.

== Geography ==
It covers an area of 74.64 km^{2} (29 sq mi) and has a population of 1194 people (2015).
