= Hetyefő =

- Coat of arms

- Location of Veszprém county in Hungary

- Location of Hetyefő
- Coordinates: 47.04625°N 17.16074°E
- Country: Hungary
- County: Veszprém

Area
  - Total: 4.11 km^{2} (1.59 sq mi)

Population (2004)
  - Total: 96
  - Density: 23.35/km^{2} (60.5/sq mi)
- Time zone: UTC+1 (CET)
  - Summer (DST): UTC+2 (CEST)
- Postal code: 8344
- Area code: 87

Hetyefő is a village in Veszprém county, Hungary.
