= Homokmégy =

Village in Hungary

- Village
- Flag Coat of arms

- Location of Homokmégy Homokmégy (Hungary) Homokmégy (Europe)
- Coordinates: 46°29′N 19°04′E
- Country: Hungary
- County: Bács-Kiskun
- District: Kalocsa

Area
  - Total: 70.33 km^{2} (27.15 sq mi)

Population (2025)
  - Total: 1,174
- Postcode: 6341
- Area code: 78
- Website: http://www.homokmegy.hu/

Homokmégy (Croatian: Mieđa) is a village and municipality in Bács-Kiskun county, in the Southern Great Plain region of southern Hungary.

== Village history ==
Homokmégy originated from a one-time branch of the river Danube as a boundary of its eastern land.

Characteristics of this area were considerably changed by protections against floods lasting since the beginning of the last century. Nowadays only geographical names of the village document the former state of the river.

In 1877, a Roman Catholic presbytery was founded, and its register of birth has been guided since 1877. In 1878, the new church was consecrated in honour of St. Adalbert. In 1938, Gyula László excavated a cemetery from Avar. The material of this excavation was preserved in the Hungarian National Museum. After 1945, the infrastructure of the village improved a lot. From 1954 till 1973, several folk music researchers and collectors visited the village. In 1963, one of the collection points of the Hungarian Ethnographical Atlas was Homokmégy. In 1996, tombs from the 10th-11th century were dug out beside the Alsómégy-Homokmégy dirt road. Homokmégy - with its peateries, pastures, grasslands almost on 1000 - was pronounced a nature conservation area in 1997.

== Geography ==
It covers an area of 70.33 km^{2} and has a population of 1544 people as of 2002.

== Sister village ==
- Vărşag (Romania)
