= Gradište, Croatia =

Gradište
- Municipality
- Municipality of Gradište; Općina Gradište
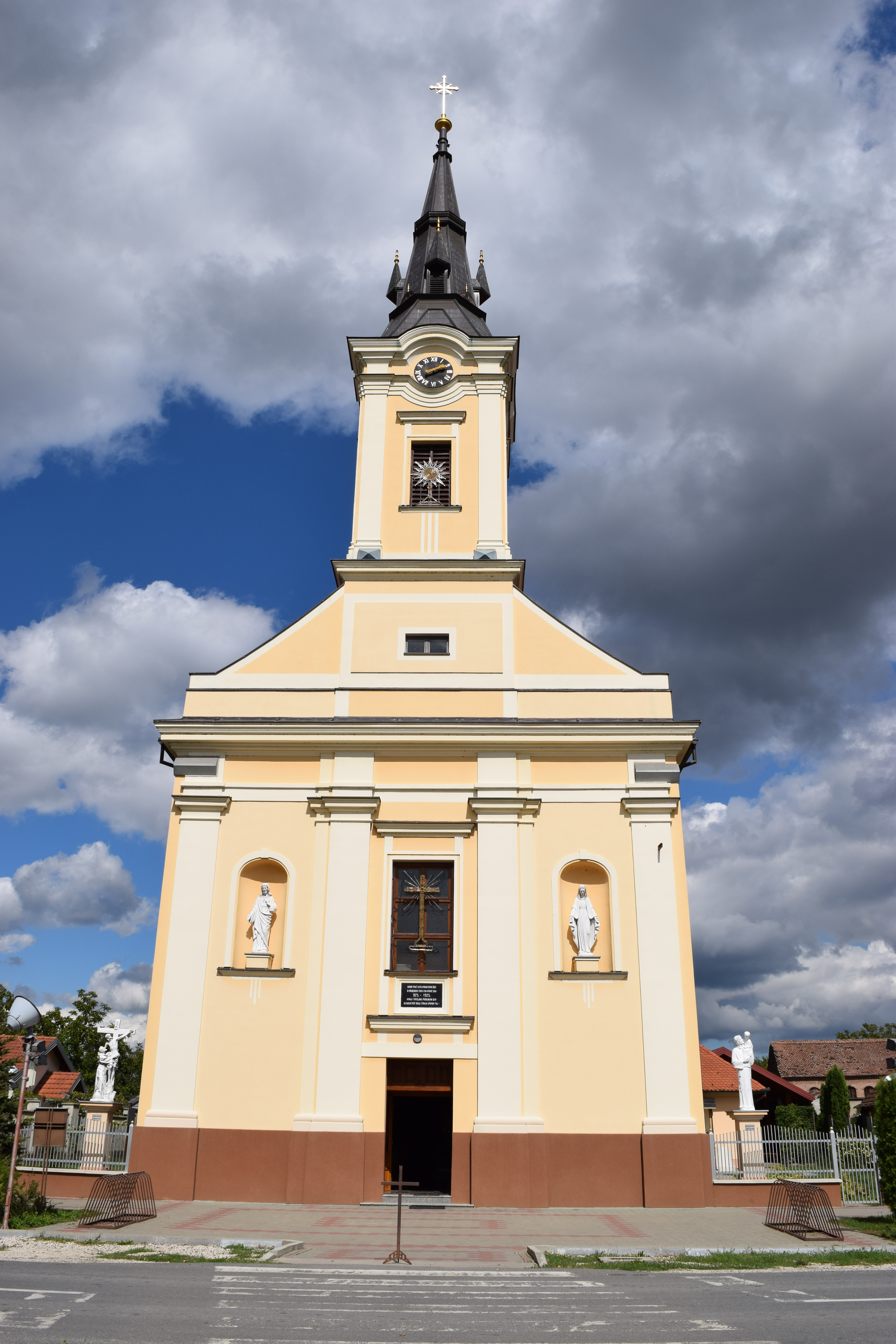

- Seal

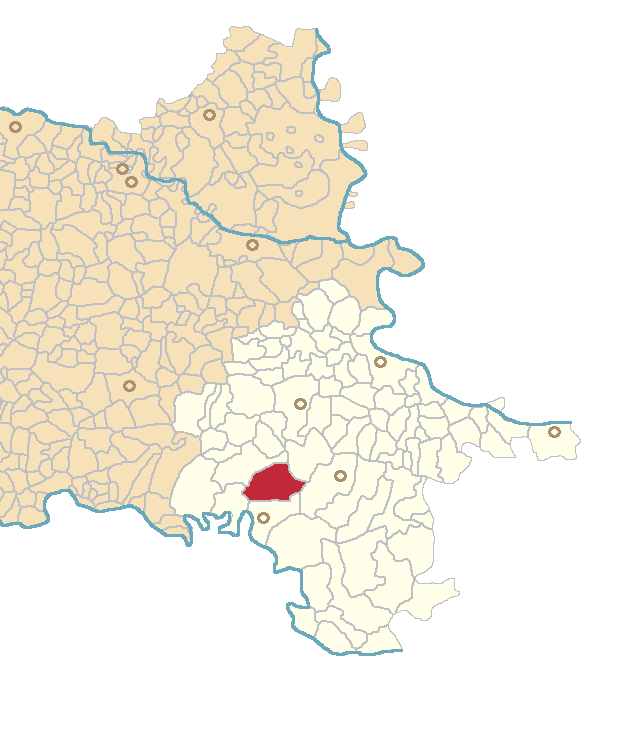

- Location in Croatia Gradište (Croatia) Gradište (Europe)
- Coordinates: 45°9′0″N 18°42′36″E
- Country: Croatia
- County: Vukovar-Syrmia County

Area
  - Municipality: 57.6 km^{2} (22.2 sq mi)
  - Urban: 57.6 km^{2} (22.2 sq mi)

Population (2021)
  - Municipality: 2,227
  - Density: 38.7/km^{2} (100/sq mi)
  - Urban: 2,227
  - Urban density: 38.7/km^{2} (100/sq mi)
- Time zone: UTC+1 (CET)
  - Summer (DST): UTC+2 (CEST)
- Postal code: ?
- Area code: 32
- Vehicle registration: VK
- Website: gradiste.hr

Gradište (Hungarian: Gradiste, German: Christburg) is a village and municipality in the Vukovar-Syrmia County in Croatia. According to the 2011 census, there are 2,773 inhabitants, 98.40% which are Croats.

It is located just west of the route D55 between Vinkovci and Županja.

== Climate ==
Since records began in 1981, the highest temperature recorded at the local weather station at an elevation of 97 metres (318 ft) was 40.8 °C (105.4 °F), on 6 August 2012. The coldest temperature was −25.0 °C (−13.0 °F), on 31 January 1987.

== See also ==
- Spačva basin
