= Battle of Pákozd =

Battle during Hungarian Revolution of 1848

- Part of the Hungarian Revolution of 1848
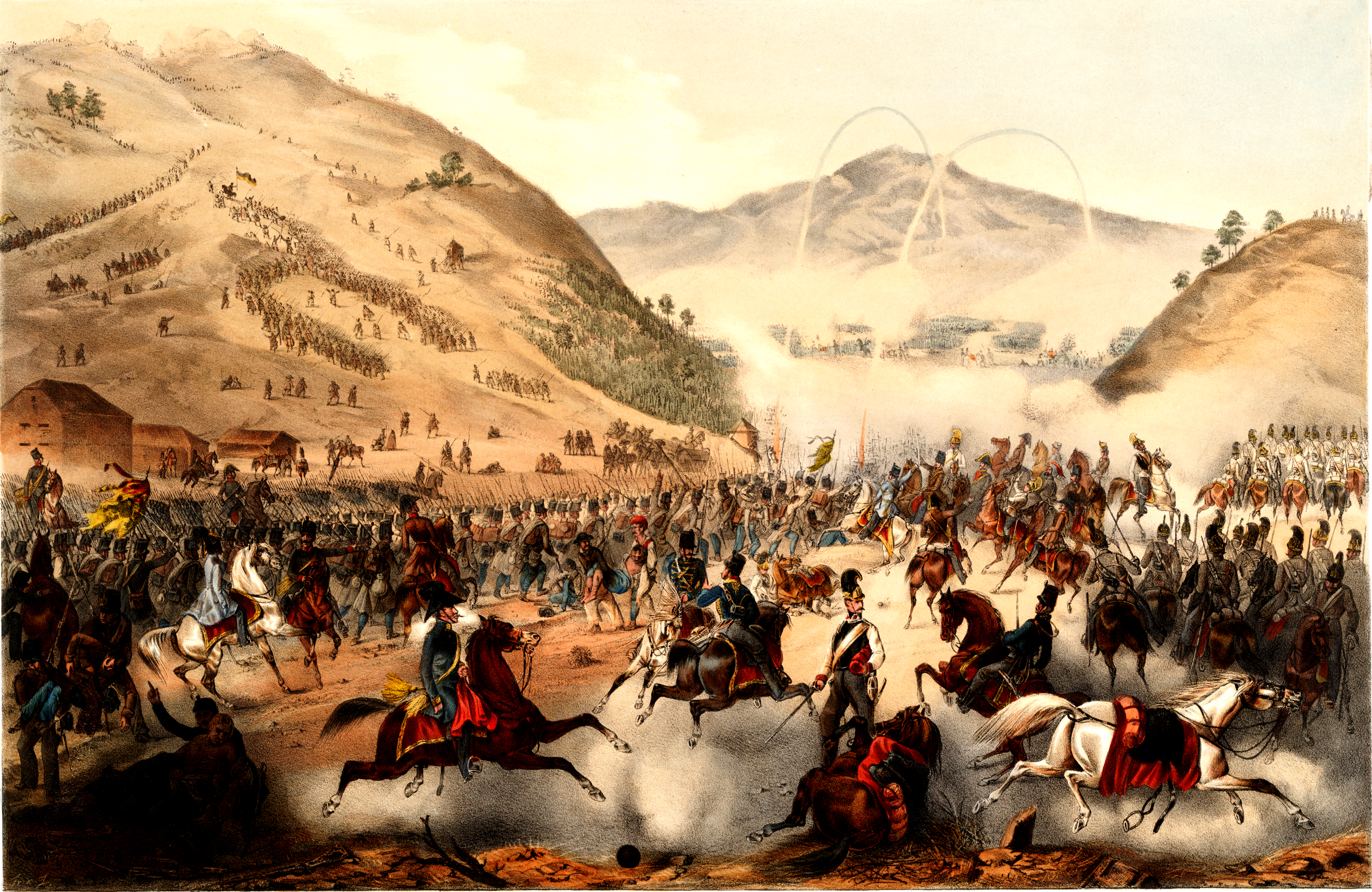
- Battle of Pákozd by Hermann Géza and Róbert Závodszky
Date	29 September 1848
Location	Pákozd – Sukoró – Pátka triangle in Fejér County, Kingdom of Hungary 47.2211°N 18.5449°E
Result	Hungarian victory

Belligerents
Austrian Empire: Kingdom of Croatia	Hungarian Revolutionary Army

Commanders and leaders
Josip Jelačić	János Móga

Strength
36,350 soldiers 48 cannons Did not participate: 14,108 soldiers, 12 cannons	10,444 soldiers 36 cannons Did not participate: 7,176 soldiers, 10 cannons

Casualties and losses
49 dead, c. 117 wounded, 27 missing	Around the same number of casualties as the enemy

The Battle of Pákozd (or Battle of Sukoró) was a battle in the Hungarian war of Independence of 1848–1849, fought on the 29 September 1848 in the Pákozd – Sukoró – Pátka triangle. It was the first and one of the most important major battles of the war of independence, in which the Hungarian revolutionary army led by Lieutenant-General János Móga stopped the troops of the Croatian Ban Josip Jelačić, who, in accordance with the Habsburg plans, was marching towards Pest to occupy it and chase out the Hungarian national government. After the battle Lieutenant General Josip Jelačić concluded an armistice with the Hungarians, but then retreated towards Vienna. Thanks to this victory Hungary repulsed the first attempt of the Habsburg empire to put down the autonomous Hungarian government, and to restore its full control over the country. The Battle of Pákozd is one of the most remembered battles in Hungarian history, which was undoubtedly due to the fact that between 1951 and 1991 the anniversary of this battle was the day of the Hungarian Army.

== Background ==
After the Ottoman–Hungarian wars ended and the whole territory of the Kingdom of Hungary in personal union with Croatia was liberated from the Ottoman rule, between 1683 and 1699 by the coalition led by the Habsburgs Croatian (later Croatian-Slavonian) Ban represented the Habsburg monarch in this area ruling over Croat and Slavonian feudal counties. The Ban, who belonged to the highest ranking barons of the county, possessed his own jurisdiction and the institution of the Croat feudal Sabor. developed from his judicial meetings. After the anti-Ottoman wars, the Military Border was established on most of the parts of Croat and Slavonian territories under military administration. However, not only did the Ban hold political supremacy over Croatian counties, but as head of the Zagreb (Hung. Zágráb) Generalkommando, he was also the commander-in-chief of the Military Border of the Ban, and that of Varaždin (Hung. Varasd), and Karlovac (Hung. Károlyváros).

Serious political, religious, and ethnic tensions had strained Hungarian-Croatian relationships even before 1848. The idea of Illyrism influenced an important part of the Croatian public. These ideas, the Croat version of Pan-Slavism, justly alarmed the Hungarian public which had been struggling with a vision of national death by drowning within a Slavic sea. Croatian public opinion, on the other hand, was irritated by Hungarian ambitions which included extending the use of the Hungarian language over all the major areas of legislation and of public administration. The purely catholic Croatia also protested against the equality of other Christian churches, propagated by the Hungarian liberals, who were in the head of the reform, and revolutionary movements of 1848, which aggravated all the above issues. Finally, Croatia's representatives at most of the reform parliamentary sessions supported the conservative government.

After March 1848 the Croat liberals had two essential demands: to unite Croatia, Slavonia, Dalmatia, the Hungarian Littoral (Rijeka and Bakar), and the Hungarian and Slavonian Military Frontier into the Triune Kingdom and to establish the right to communicate in Croatian with the Hungarian authorities. The office of the Ban had been empty since 1845, but the Hungarian revolution of 15 March 1848 and the appointment as Hungarian prime minister of the liberal Lajos Batthyány forced the Austrian authorities to appoint a Croatian Ban loyal to them. Baron Franz (Franjo) Kulmer proposed to the newly appointed Austrian Prime Minister that Baron Josip Jelačić, colonel of the 1st Border Guard Regiment of the Ban, be commissioned to this post. Austrian Prime Minister Kollowrat himself considered it important that a forceful, popular person loyal to the Empire should be appointed to this post before the independent Hungarian government, responsible to the parliament, would be appointed. The Emperor appointed Jelačić as Croatian Ban on March 23. The following day the new Ban was promoted to major-general and head of Zágráb Generalkommando. On April 8 he was promoted to lieutenant general. Because of his paternal nature, Jelačić enjoyed great popularity among his subordinates. His excellent organizing ability and charisma soon won over a major part of the Croat public to his cause.

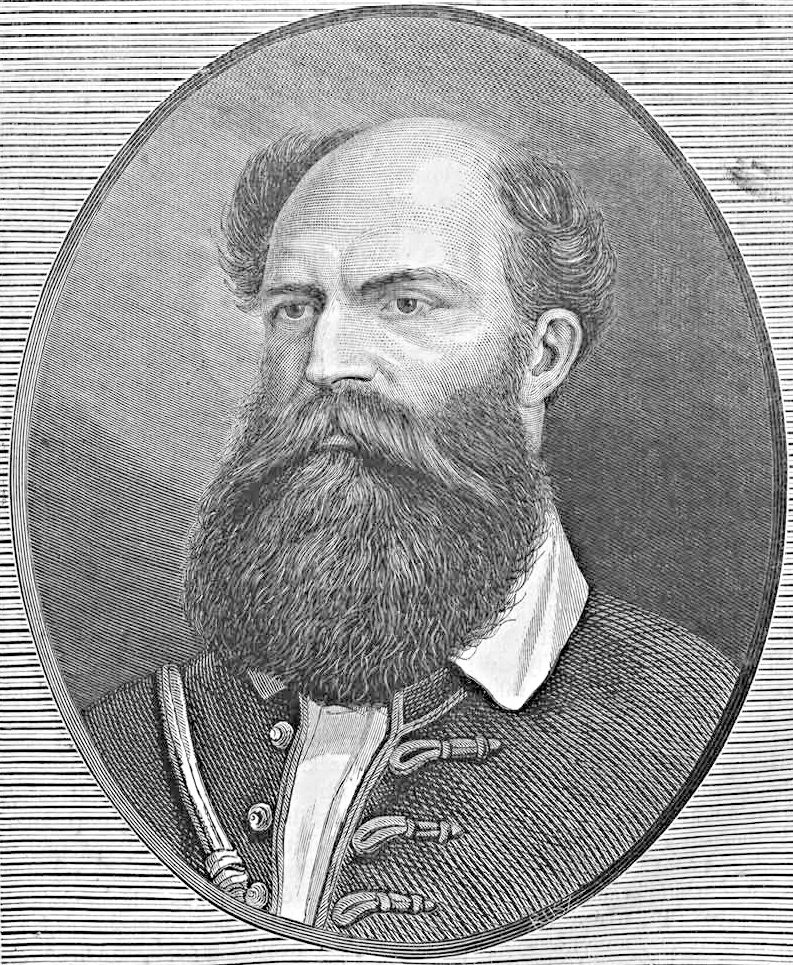
Prime minister Lajos Batthyány

On April 19 the Hungarian government called Jelačić to Pest to discuss the details of his inauguration and questions about the Croatian provincial assembly; Jelačić declined. What is more, after arriving in Zágráb he severed all the connections between Hungary and Croatia. On April 25 he declared martial law and announced that civilian administration in Croatia, Slavonia, and on the Hungarian Littoral were under his jurisdiction. He tried to turn Croatian public opinion against the ongoing Hungarian socio-political transformation by referring to Croatian national injustices and by using national slogans. He announced the abolition of serfdom under his jurisdiction as if the April Laws of 1848 were not valid in Croatia. The Ban did not respond to Hungarian initiatives to negotiate. When, on the 10th of June the Emperor, at Hungarian demands, suspended him as Ban, Jelačić threw aside the monarch's decree saying that it could not have been His Majesty's act or the Emperor must have done it under duress. The Hungarian government offered Croatia the option of a personal union with Hungary and then even secession, but all in vain since Jelačić and the Croatian Sabor demanded the same thing as Vienna—the surrender of independent Hungarian finances, defense, and trade to the imperial government. So the Ban expressed what the Habsburg Camarilla wanted to do with Hungary, plans which were kept in secret by Vienna until the open break up with the revolutionary government in September–October, which aimed the returning of the country to the pre-revolution situation, unacceptable for the Batthyány Government and for Hungary. This showed that Jelačić did not want any compromise with Hungary and that his primary objective was not the status of Croatia, but the reinstallation in Hungary of the pre-1848 Habsburg oppression. This The only positive outcome of the meeting was that Batthyány and Jelačić agreed that he would withdraw his troops from the Dráva River. László Csány, government commissioner of Vas, Zala, Veszprém, and Sopron counties, sent numerous reports about Illyrist agent provocateurs on territories bordering Croatia who incited former serfs against the noblemen and they also fomented propaganda for annexing the Muraköz to Croatia. In return Minister of the Interior Bertalan Szemere appointed Csány as royal commissioner of Zala, Somogy, Baranya, and Tolna counties and instructed him to keep an eye on the other side of the river with the help of the deployed regular army of 4,000 soldiers and the county national guardsmen of 14,000 men. During mobilization in July a 29,000 strong army, was sent to the Dráva area. The regular army on the defensive line contained four infantry battalions, a honvéd battalion, a regiment of cuirassiers, two companies of light cavalry (Chevau-légers), and six companies of hussars. The artillery contained four batteries (24 guns altogether). The actual number probably was beyond 35,000. This army remained significant in size until the end of July when two regular battalions and thousands of national guardsmen were detached and sent to the Bácska operational theatre. Later on new hussar companies, a honvéd battalion, and two companies of volunteers arrived to strengthen the line. Altogether the numbers were reduced by 10,000 from the mid-July figures. A bigger problem, however, came to light concerning recruits of non-Hungarian origin—they proved to be unreliable. Early in August Commander of the Dráva guarding line, Major-General Ferenc Ottinger, instructed his soldiers not to resist but rather to retreat without fighting in case the Croats occupied Muraköz. Royal commissioner Csányi had not been informed about the order and, consequently, resigned from his post in protest, although he had not even dispatched his letter of resignation when Ottinger himself resigned.

Until early August Jelačić did not seriously consider launching an attack against Hungary. He deployed only a few battalions at the border and occupied Varasd early June. Most of the 1st and 2nd battalions of the border guard regiments were in Italy and serious officer and armament shortages appeared in the rest of the battalions. In July Jelačić went on a tour of Slavonia and the Szerémség and won over the border guard regiments one after the other. Between August 8 and 10, after his return to Croatia, his troops occupied Virovitica County (Verőce) and then Szerém county in mid-August. According to the recollections of one of his generals, by then, Jelačić had decided to be the first to attack, before the Hungarians would. On August 9 Jelačić sent to Major-General Roth, commander of the Bród Border Guard Regiment, orders relating both to Roth's border guard regiments and to details of preparations for a general attack. Between August 17 and 20 the Ban visited all the borderlands under his command and prompted 28,576 people to rise against the Hungarians. General Neustadter was sent to Slavonia to make preparations there. In the second half of August the Slavonian– Szerémség border guard regiments formally declared that they intended to follow Jelačić's commands.9 On August 21 Jelačić instructed Roth and his troops to push forward to the Dráva River and to occupy Eszék.

After Ottinger's departure the Hungarian side of the Dráva line was left without a commander for a while. In his appeal of August 25 Batthyány informed the Transdanubian authorities that “we ought to expect a factual violation of our country’s borders any minute.” On August 31 the Eszék garrison announced that in case the expected Hungarian-Croatian conflict occurred they would remain neutral and keep the fortress for His Majesty, Ferdinand V. This dealt a disadvantage to both the Hungarians and the Croats since, according to the Eszék declaration, the Croats were forbidden from using the crossing over the Dráva River at Eszék. Because of troop deployments to other areas, only the following Hungarian units were stationed along the Dráva line: two regular infantry battalions, one honvéd battalion, ten hussar companies, two companies of light cavalry, and a regiment of cuirassiers. One more honvéd battalion was expected to arrive soon. The majority of county national guard battalions—except for Vas county's national guard regiment of three battalions—were waiting for relief in order to return home. However, due to the organization of the Volunteer Mobile National Guard it was doubtful whether the relevant counties would send new battalions to protect the Dráva line. Although at the end of August Adám Teleki moved his army closer to the Dráva River and occupied Muraköz, he did not expect to be able to mount a successful defense once the Croats attacked.

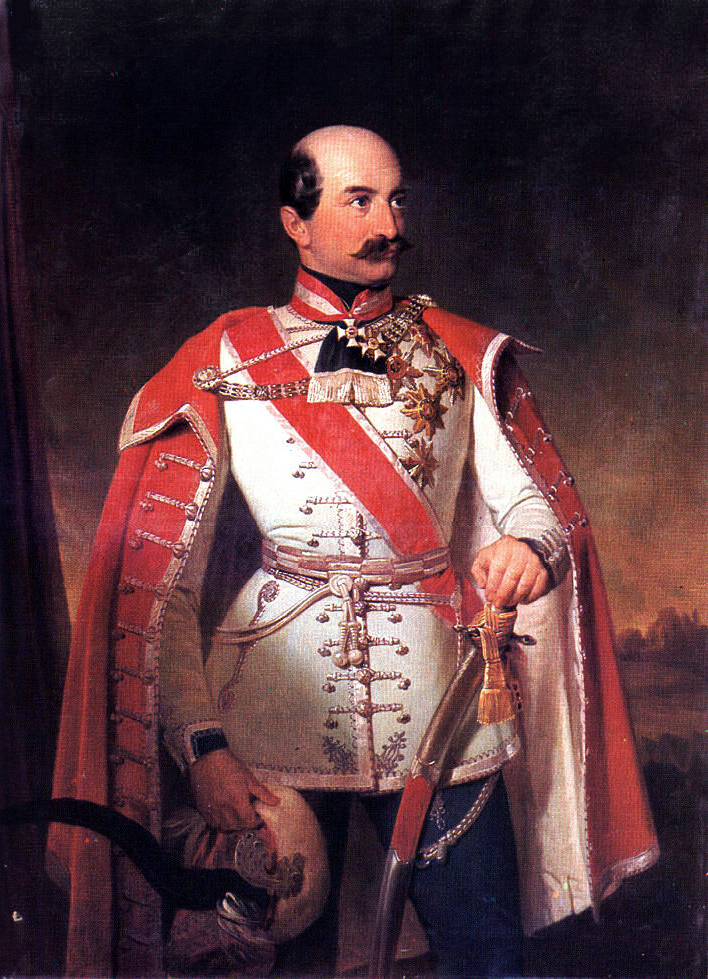
Lieutenant General Baron Josip Jelačić of Bužim, Ban of the Kingdom of Croatia and Commander of the Croatian Military Frontier

War preparations on all sides accelerated after Radetzky’s victory at Custozza. The Serbian Metropolitan of Karlovci Josif Rajačić, the spiritual leader of the Serbian insurgents against Hungary, prodded Jelačić, fearing that Hungarian troops concentrated in Bácska would quash the Serbian uprising. On August 23 he reprimanded Jelačić for abandoning the Serbs.

On August 26 Jelačić was notified from Vienna that the Imperial Court endorsed the justice of the Croatian and Serbian issues saying that “very soon the Court will declare it.” He was also promised that, as soon as he set out for the battlefield the June 10th “disparaging manifesto (the suspension of him as Ban of Croatia) would be withdrawn.” Jelačić, in turn, notified Rajačić about all the above and about the impending attack on August 28. But before this attack, his troops occupied Fiume, considered by Hungary as its own port to the Adriatic Sea on August 31. This meant that the Croatian troops entered in Hungarian territory, thus the war had begun.

On September 4, with reference to Jelačić's loyalty and devotion the Emperor revoked his June 10 suspension and declared that Jelačić “is expected to operate for the benefit of the whole Monarchy, for the maintenance of the Hungarian Crown’s integrity, and for the beneficial development of the relationships of the Hungarian associated countries.”

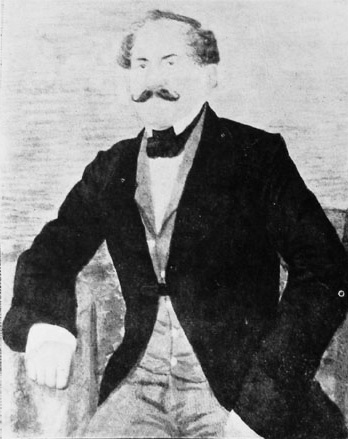
János Móga

On August 27, 28, and 29 Jelačić sent out orders from Zagreb to his troops to move forward to the Hungarian border. The attack was to take place on the 10th and 11 September. He speculated that his troops crossing the Dráva River at several points would force the Hungarians to give up the left bank of the river without any fight. Therefore, he instructed his commanders that if they encountered resistance, they should wait for the crossing of other columns and their appearance at the side of the enemy. His plan was to advance on to Muraköz and from there to advance on along the southeastern side of Lake Balaton towards Székesfehérvár and Pest-Buda. The Slavonian army corps of Major General Franz Karl von Roth would join the main forces at Nagykanizsa. All the above would be complemented by a general attack by the Serbs in the Bánság and Bácska regions. Jelačić could hardly believe that this plan would lead to serious results. Yet he did hope that in this way the best Hungarian troops would not disturb his march to Pest. Allegedly, Imperial-Royal Minister of Defense Feldzeugmeister Theodor Franz, Count Baillet von Latour suggested that the Ban should not march directly towards Buda, but instead march towards Komárom from where he could march against either Buda or Vienna. The Ban supposedly also contemplated marching towards Pozsony and instigating an uprising among the Slovak population.

On September 9 the Croats closed off the Dráva bridge at Varasd. It was obvious that an attack was only a matter of hours away. Teleki reported it to the Buda Generalkommando. The report arrived in Pest on September 11, the day the government resigned. Teleki also asked Palatine Stephen what he should do in case Jelačić's army launched an attack. The Palatine responded that as a Habsburg duke he was unable to give any advice. However, as a Hungarian palatine he would say that if Jelačić could not produce a direct order from the Monarch ordering an attack on Hungary and if Teleki commanded a substantial force, then Teleki should encounter the invading army with his own forces.

Initially Teleki's plan was to defend Muraköz. But when he received the September 4 manifesto, he abandoned his original idea. This was the correct thing to do from a military point of view. With the armed force at hand, Teleki would have been unable to stop the flood of Jelačić's soldiers and would have needlessly risked his valuable forces at Muraköz. (He had 3,100 regular soldiers and volunteers, 1,000 hussars, and 12 guns). On September 9 Teleki approached the Ban and asked him not to start hostilities as long as he was not officially informed about the September 4 manifesto. In his response the Ban declared that the Batthyány government now no longer existed. Consequently, Teleki ought to join him since 90 percent of the Imperial-Royal Army identified with Jelačić's cause. Teleki asked for Jelačić's patience until the messenger arrived the following morning. At the same time Teleki ordered a general retreat, because in case the Croatians advanced on at Légrád, they could cut off the retreat of his forces towards Nagykanizsa.

== Prelude ==
On September 11 Jelačić's troops (51,117 soldiers, 1,902 horses, and 48 guns) crossed the Dráva River at several points and advanced on to Muraköz. Teleki received the Palatine's letter of encouragement to offer resistance and Royal Commissioner László Csány also implored him to resist. It did not occur to Teleki that Jelačić had crossed the Hungarian–Croat border without the consent of the Emperor. In the meantime he learned that the Batthyány government had resigned and that the Hungarian Parliament had delegated Lajos Kossuth and Bertalan Szemere, two deputies accused by the pro-Habsburg loyalists of being radicals, to hold executive authority. This induced the loyalist Teleki to inform Csány that he could not recognize Kossuth and Szemere as his legitimate superiors and he would rather retreat with his forces. Then he sent a message of his neutrality to Jelačić who ordered Teleki to march out of Hungary to Styria for the sake of complete neutrality. In the meantime Csány wanted Teleki to hand over the guns in his possession since he was unwilling to defend the Hungarian homeland. Teleki declined the request saying that they were the possessions of the Emperor. When Csány warned him that it would be impossible to feed the troops in the area (Keszthely and its surroundings) where Teleki had planned to withdraw to in a neutral position. Teleki threatened Csány that he would march his troops to Jelačić's camp unless Csány provided them with supplies. At the same time he turned down the Jelačić's order as well. However, his decision might have been influenced by the fact that by September 14 he had learned that the Palatine had again delegated Batthyány to form a government. Therefore, a legal legislative and executive power existed in the country.

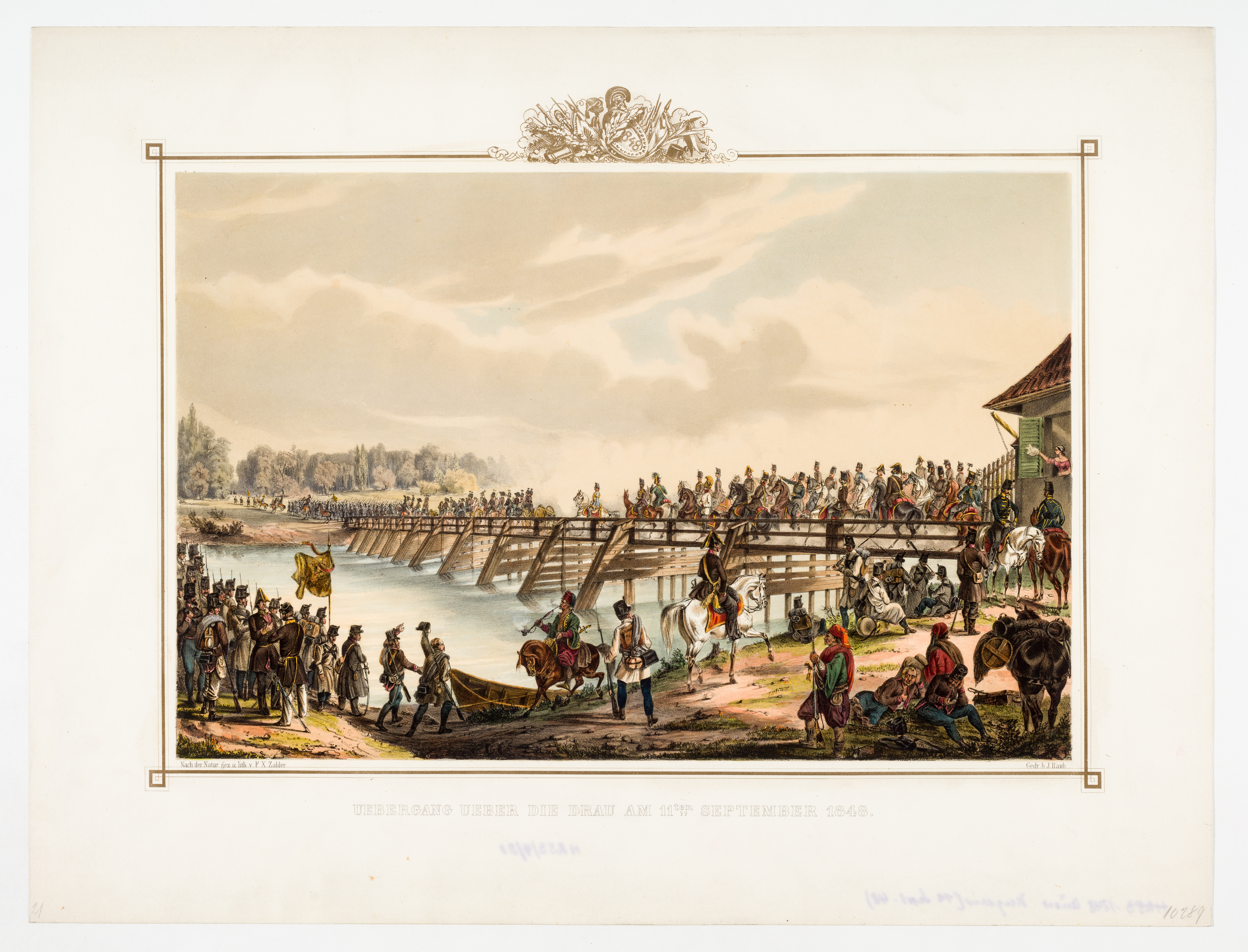
Crossing over the Drava river by the Croatian army led by Josip Jelačić on 11 September 1848 by Franz Xaver Zalder

Meanwhile, Jelačić's troops crossed the Mura River on September 14–15, and advanced towards Nagykanizsa, almost unhindered. Before crossing the river he called on all foreign cavalry regiments stationed in Hungary to join his army. On September 16 a squadron of the Wrbna light cavalry, on September 19 a squadron of the Kress light cavalry, and all of the Hardegg regiment of cuirassiers joined the Ban's army. Jelačić was in dire need of these units since he had very few cavalry units. However, the quality of the hussar regiment that the Ban consequently established did not match Hungarian's and this discrepancy in quality caused several problems for Jelačić. The four companies of light cavalry were unsuitable to counterbalance the Hungarian hussars in reconnaissance. A regiment of cuirassiers could be used in an open battle but not in scouting nor in shock-actions. More than half of the artillery consisted of three-pounder cannons and Congreve rockets, altogether there were 18 six-pounder cannons. Compared to this, the Hungarian party had exclusively six-pounders. A significant portion of the Croat infantry was formed by younger and older age groups of border guard regiments, mobilized reserve or militia battalions, without an adequate number of officers. There were between 5,400 and 9,300 soldiers in these battalions, making them unmanageable since the effectives of a regimental battalion amounted to 1,200 only.

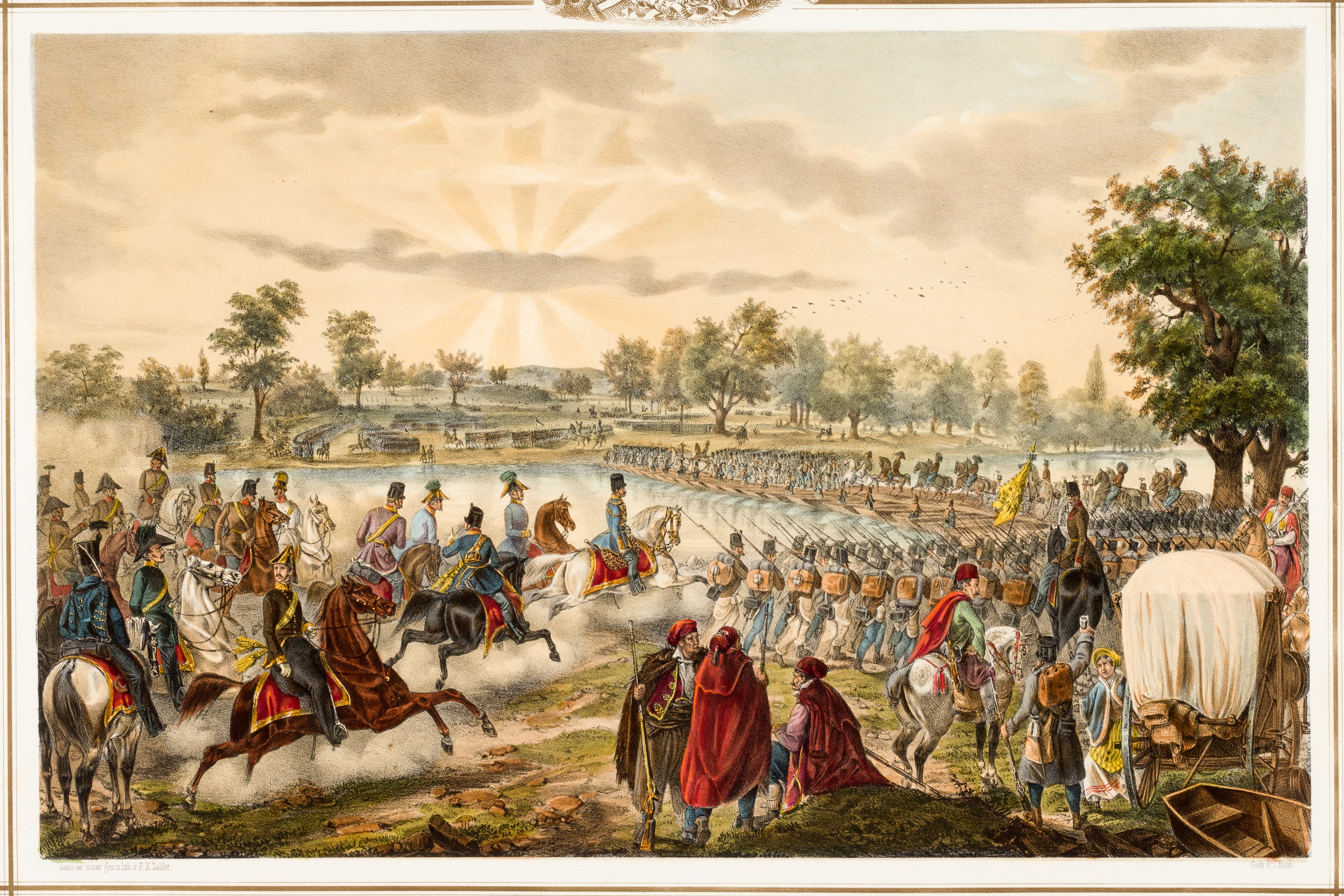
Crossing of the Mura river by the Croatian army at 11. September 1848 Franz by Franz Xaver Zalder

On September 14 the Hungarian officers’ corps decided to send a delegation to Jelačić to request to see the imperial decree that authorized him to attack Hungary. If Jelačić had one, the regular regiments would remain neutral. If he did not, the regiments would engage the Ban's army as soon as they had the chance. A Hungarian delegation went in the Croatian camp, and demanded Jelačić to show them the imperial decree, but he was unable to show them anything. He delivered instead some high-flown speeches about brotherhood in arms and the glorious Imperial-Royal Army while trying to impress upon the envoys, but without success.

On September 15 the Hungarian decision to resist against the Croatian army was reinforced by Palatine Stephen's appointment as commander in chief of the army—through Battyhány's efforts and pressure—in hopes that the Palatine would be able to hold the loyalty of the officers’ corps.

The Palatine intended to meet Jelačić on deck of a steamer on the Lake Balaton, but the latter declined to appear. The Palatine noted that Jelačić was so confident that he could afford to humiliate even an imperial and royal archduke. Therefore, Palatine Stephen transferred his command to Lieutenant General János Móga, left the camp, returned to Pest, and then left for Vienna.

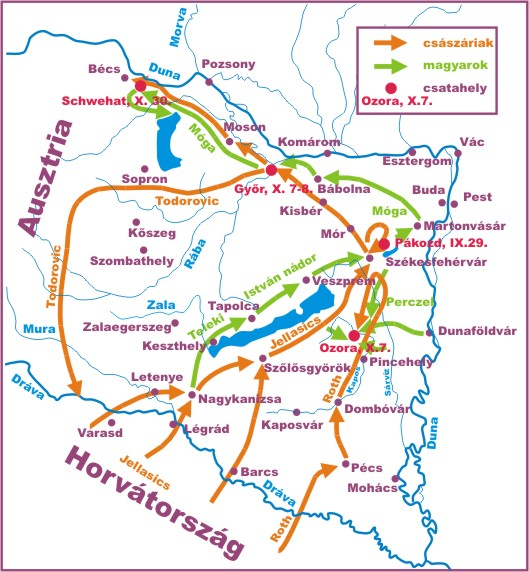
The Croatian campaign in Hungary

After crossing the Mura River Jelačić modified his earlier war plans. Overestimating the success of his advances he declined to wait for Roth's army corps, which were scheduled to move on September 17. Therefore, Roth was unable to make contact with the main forces of the Ban before September 20–21. Supply difficulties also affected his decision. Roth was instructed that his troops should not go towards Légrád, but rather take a direct northern route from Verőce across Baranya and Tolna counties towards Székesfehérvár. Jelačić hoped that the 1st (John) Dragoon Regiment would join Roth's troops since they did not have any kind of a cavalry. Jelačić also hoped that the Schwarzenberg lancer (uhlan) regiment, withdrawn from the Banat (Bánság), would join him as well. He himself launched two of his army corps along the southern side of the Lake Balaton and the third one towards Székesfehérvár via the Iharosberény–Böhönye–Tard–Kaposvár–Simontornya route. This way he hoped to overtake the Hungarian forces at Székesfehérvár or to contact Roth's forces in the Tolna county area. He gave up on the latter idea when he learned that the Hungarian troops were ready to evacuate Székesfehérvár.

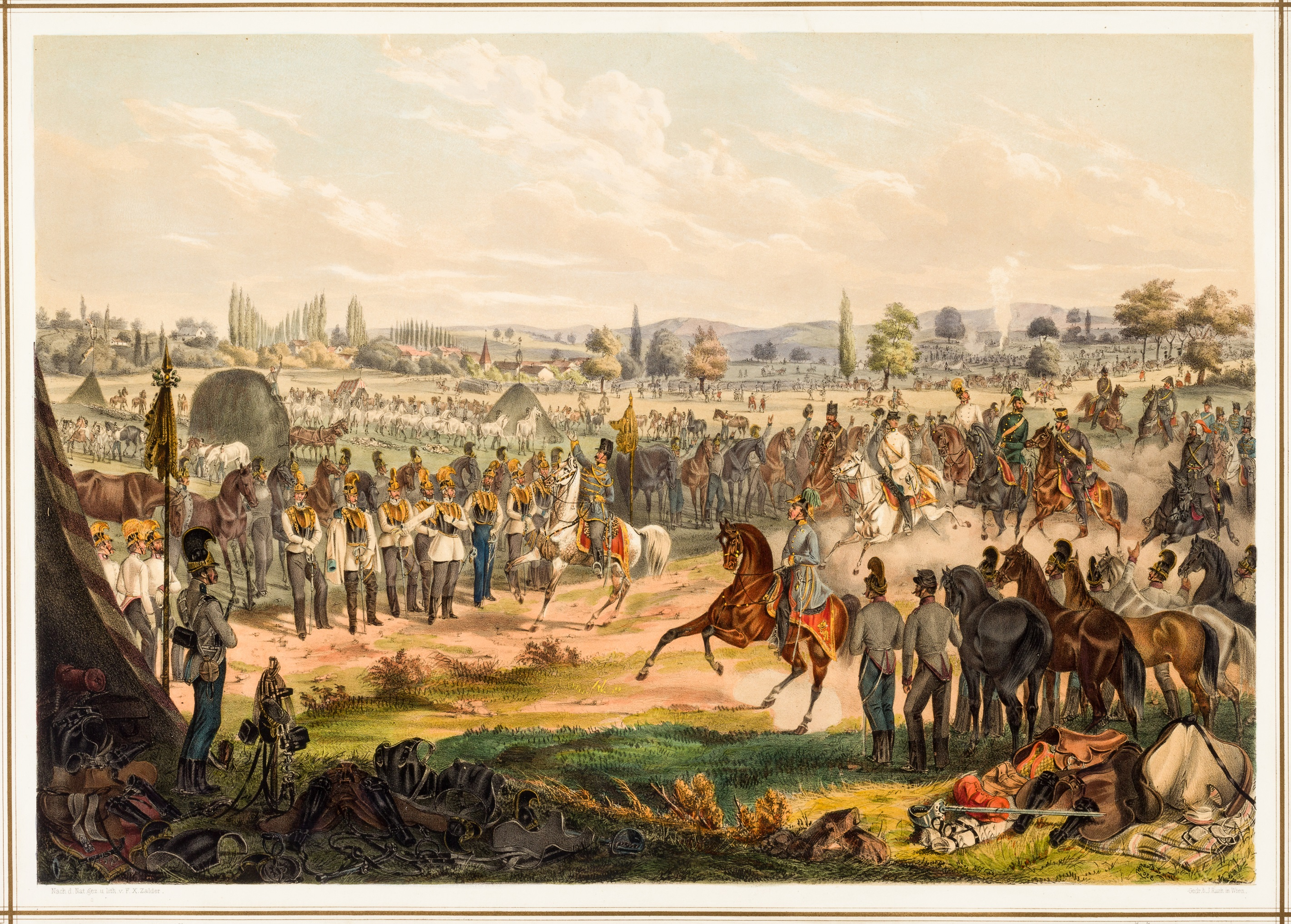
The Kres 1st Major's Division of the 7th (Kress) Light Cavalry (chevau léger) Regiment joins the army of Josip Jelačić, at 19. September 1848 by Franz Xaver Zalder

After the Croat invasion Csány had declared a levée en masse within the threatened counties and Batthyány expanded it onto the whole of Transdanubia on September 19. The levy became more active because a substantial part of the Croat army started looting immediately after crossing the Hungarian borders. Although their destructiveness could not be compared with the atrocities committed by the Serbian rebels, their looting was a deep source of bitterness for the people of Transdanubia. This is why it was evident that Batthyány's call for levy in mass met with such a good response. Jelačić himself had not counted on that either. Ten days after the Croat troops crossed the Dráva River, communications between the army and the hinterland practically ceased to exist. The Zala and Somogy county national guardsmen, militiamen, and volunteers intercepted several hundred carriages transporting food and equipment, thus preventing the Croatian troops left behind from venturing beyond Nagykanizsa. During a surprise attack a major part of Jelačić's mail came into Hungarian hands. It turned out from the intercepted letters, some of which were published in the official journal, that Jelačić was tightly connected with the Austrian government and that Minister of Defense Latour was among the Ban's most active supporters.

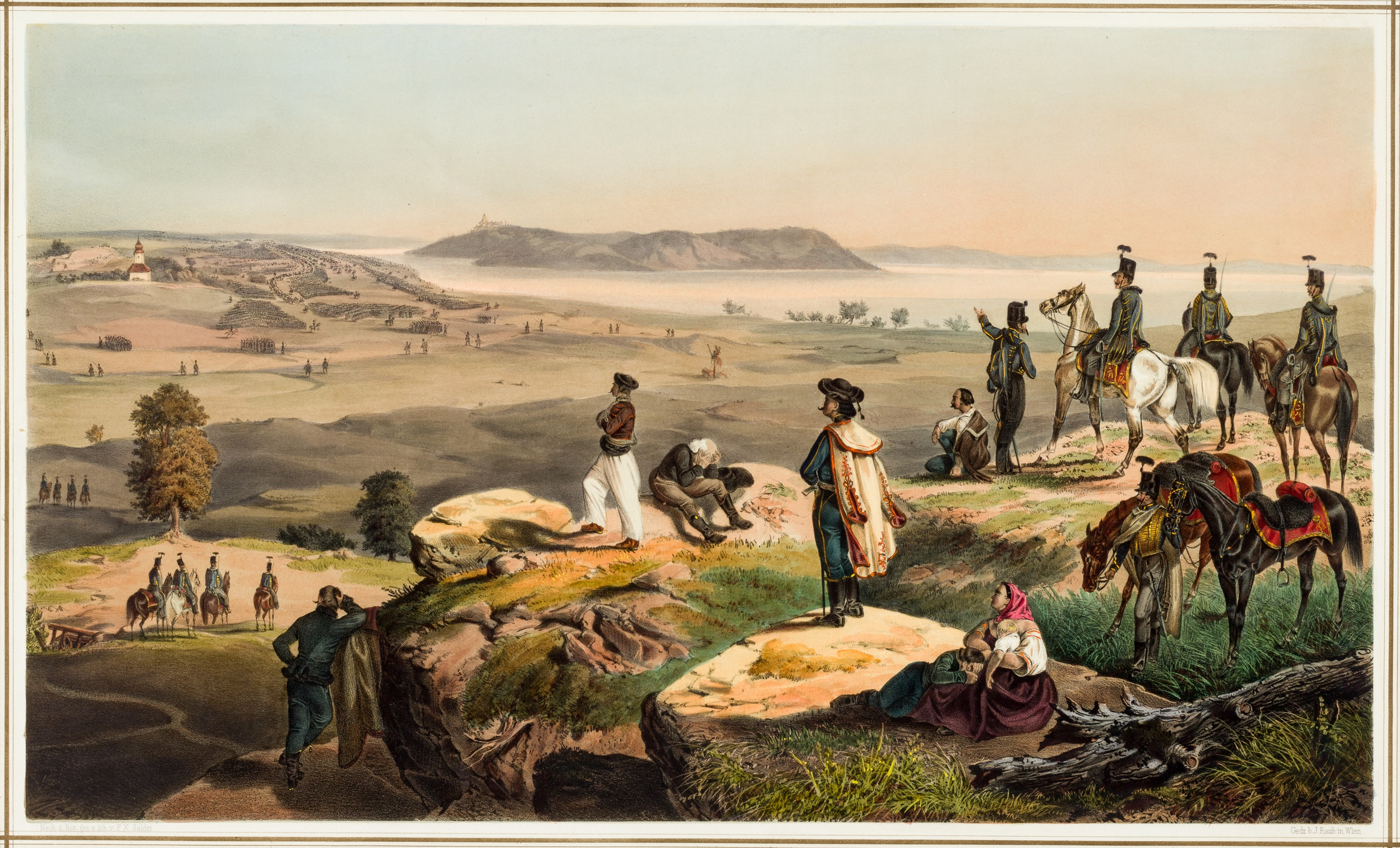
The Croatian army marching near the lake Balaton towards Székesfehérvár by Franz Xaver Zalder

In the meantime the Hungarian army, numbering 5,000 soldiers on September 18, was growing. Batthyány continued to send new volunteers, regular regimental and honvéd infantry, and hussar units, as well as artillery batteries to the camps at Veszprém, and later at Székesfehérvár. The number of soldiers was over 11,000 on September 21, 13,000 on the 23rd, reached 16,000 on the 25th, and 17,500 on the 28th. The Hungarian command wanted to hold up the Ban's army in the Székesfehérvár area. However, on September 26 after a short rear guard action, they gave up the city and retreated towards the northern shore of the Lake Velence.

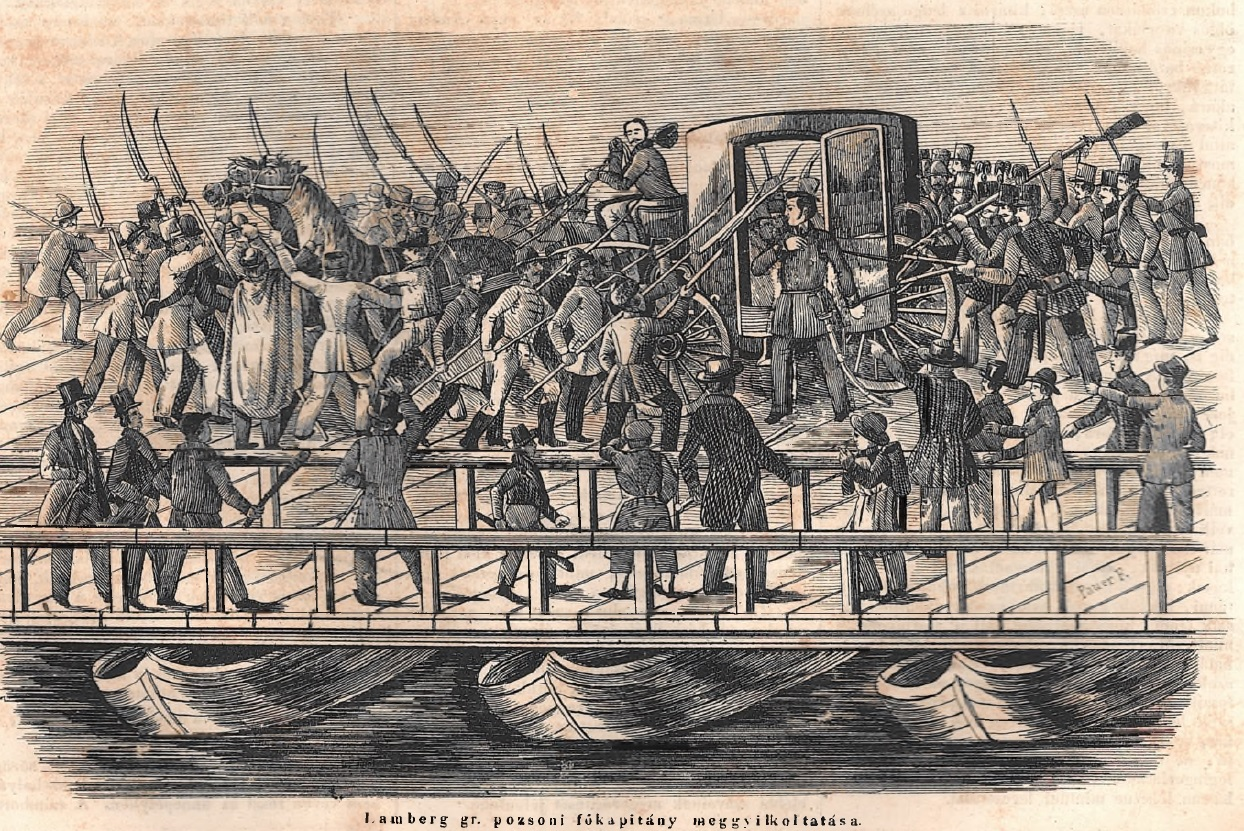
The killing of Lamberg

Seeing that the Hungarians would not surrender to Jelačić without a fight, the political circles from Vienna attempted to put the genie, unleashed by themselves, back in the bottle. On September 25 the Emperor appointed Lieutenant General Count Franz Philipp von Lamberg as royal commissioner and commander-in-chief of the armed forces, and Senechal György Mailáth as royal governor of Hungary. Battyány hoped that Lamberg would be able to restrain Jelačić and, since he had been informed that Lamberg would visit the camp, Batthyány himself rushed there to reinforce Lamberg's appointment. The news about Lamberg's appointment created uncertainty and conflict among the officers from the Hungarian army because it stated, with the signature of the king, to whom they had sworn, that they should not fight against Jelačić. On 27 September Jelačić was informed by an envoy of Batthyány about Lamberg's appointment, and withdrew the attack order which he had planned for the next day, agreeing with the Hungarians for 24 hours ceasefire, waiting for Lamberg to arrive at his headquarters from Székesfehérvár. But the next day Lamberg din not come, because he went to Pest, so Jelačić gave the order to attack the Hungarians on the next day. On 28 September Jelačić sent order to Roth, who was advancing through Tolna county, to enter and remain in Székesfehérvár, because he, with the main Croatian forces, will take Buda easily. In the meantime and in Batthyány's absence, by Kossuth's motion, the Parliament declared Lamberg a traitor and appointment as unlawful. The Parliament's mistrust in the authenticity of the royal manifesto with Lamberg's appointment was reinforced by the fact that the ministerial countersignature was missing from it. Lamberg, consequently, fell victim to an enraged mob on the pontoon bridge between Pest and Buda on September 28. The news of this did not reach the Hungarian camp until the evening of 28 September, and the Croatian army learned about this only on 29 September, when they were marching, according to Jelačić's order, towards the hills of Sukoró to clash with the Hungarian army.

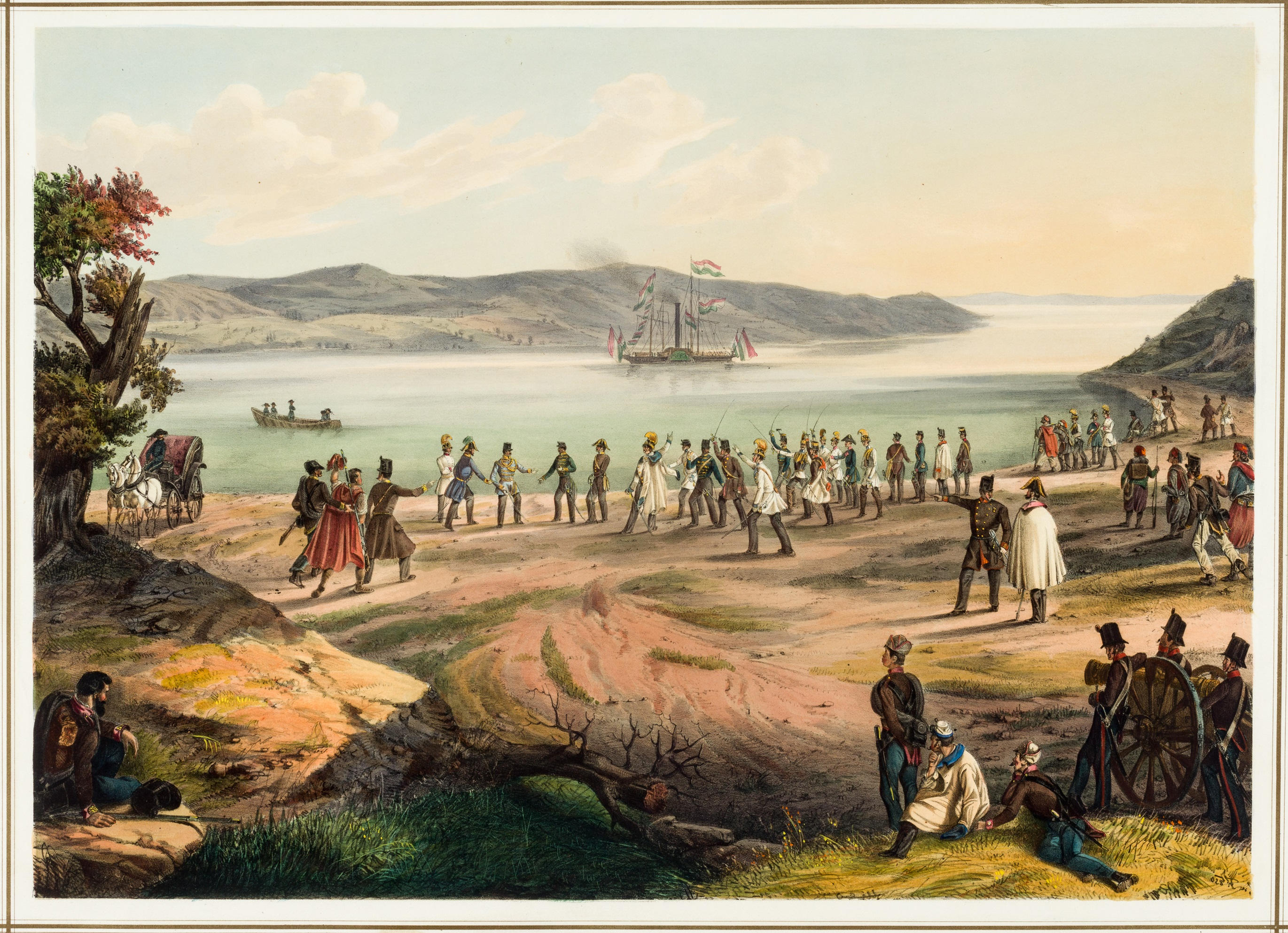
Archduke Stephen tries to negotiate with Josip Jelačić on a steamboat on the Lake Balaton to stop his campaign on 21. September 1848, but the Ban refuses by Franz Xaver Zalder

On 27 September the Hungarian House of Representatives ordered the army of Transdanubia to take up the fight. At the military council of Sukoró on 28 September, the commissioners sent by Parliament demanded the army to resist Jelačić's army. Such a passionate debate erupted that it was almost feared that the army would break up without a fight. Commander of the Zrínyi Volunteer Unit, Mór Perczel called the officers with Habsburg military background "black and yellow fluke", on which both Móga and the loyalist officers unsheathed their swords. The situation was saved by Batthyány, who convinced Móga to resist if on the next day Jelačić would have attacked. Right when the war council ended, the news about Lamberg's assassination reached the Hungarian camp. The leadership of the army was afraid that this news will make the former imperial officers to resign, but only one of them decided to do so.

On September 28, the Ban's army was concentrated southwest of Pákozd, between this place and Székesfehérvár, and on the same day Major Fligelli was sent out to spy on the Hungarian camp and as far as possible, to learn if in Pest the Hungarians are preparing to defend themselves in case of his troops' advancement against the capital. At the same time as Fligelli was sent out, Jelačić ordered a reconnaissance-in-force against the Hungarian camp.

But Major Fligelly was captured at Martonvásár by the Hungarian national guards and was interrogated by Batthyány, who took from him the letter written by Jelačić to Lamberg, in which the Ban informed the Lieutenant General that he had been informed of the royal open order, but that he could not comply with the supreme wish at the present time. Batthyány took the letter and asked his entourage to keep what they had heard and the contents of the letter secret.

On the night of 28 to 29 September Batthyány went to Jelačić's camp trying to convince him to wait until Lamberg's arrival. On 29 in the morning, the Ban refused, and ordered his troops to advance towards the Hungarian army installed on the hills from Pátka and Sukoró. One of the reasons for this was that in the region of Székesfehérvár he could not feed his troops continuously, because the Hungarian army had previously thoroughly exploited the area.

On the next day by 6 a.m., Jelačić ordered an offensive advance of his troops, with the following groupings:
- the right column under Major-General Kempen on the road to Pest;
– in the center a division led by Jelačić himself, advanced across the Pákozd heights towards the Sukoró plateau.
– the left column to carry out the decisive attack under Lieutenant-General Hartlieb on the road to Alcsút.

=== The battlefield and the positioning of the two armies ===
The Hungarian right flank was positioned on the northern shore of Lake Velence, on the hills between Pátka and Pákozd, south of the Lovasberény road, to cut the enemy's road towards Buda. Móga placed more than a third of his infantry here, including two battalions of line infantry. Móga gave the overall command over this wing to Lieutenant colonel József Milpökh. The multifaceted, accidented topography which dominated the region where the Hungarian right wing was placed, including the region of Pátka, made any enemy cavalry and artillery attacks very difficult. The Hungarian commanders were expecting a massive infantry attack on this direction. Only two companies of hussars and 8 guns supported the Hungarian right flank. The Hungarian troops on this flank were positioned along the road to Bicske, with their right wing leaning on the marshes from Pátka, to secure the extreme right flank, and as protection against encircling, two hussar companies were assigned to the northern exit of Pátka. The Hungarian right flank was formed as follows: in the first line of battle the two (1st and 2nd) Pest battalions of the Cisdanubia Volunteer Mobile National Guards were deployed, the vanguard was made of the 6th (Kecskemét) company of the 2nd Pest battalion. Ivánka deployed the companies of the two battalions in an echelon formation, taking advantage of the terrain, while two companies were positioned as support behind the heights, which lay 60 paces behind the battalions. 250–300 paces behind them the 3rd (Hont–Esztergom) and the 4th (Nógrád) battalions were deployed. To the north of these two battalions, in line with them, was the 1st Battalion of the 60th (Wasa) Infantry Regiment, in front of it the 3rd Six Pounder half Honvéd battery and the Half Battery of Major Imre Ivánka. At the northern end of the position stood the Tolna Volunteer Mobile National Guard Battalion and two companies of the 9th (Nicholas) Hussar Regiment. Two Hussar companies were on outpost at Pátka. The 3rd Battalion of the 48th (Ernest) Infantry Regiment probably formed the reserve.

The Hungarian center was located on the vine-growing hills between Pákozd and Sukoró. It was commanded by Major General Franz Holtsche. The postal road from Székesfehérvár to Buda passed through this section, and on both sides of this road, an infantry attack was hampered by the wet, marshy terrain. According to the Hungarian war diary, written after the battle: this terrain gave the Hungarian army the advantage of being able to use its batteries in all directions without any change of position, completely dominating the area, and in the case of an [enemy] deployment between the hills which lie in front and those which were held [by the Hungarians], the stream running through the valley made a decisive advance of the enemy possible only by the main road. The enemy could deploy his cavalry only here. Móga placed more than half of his artillery here: 28 guns. A Honvéd battalion, a volunteer battalion and 2 line infantry battalions made here the infantry, and 4 companies of hussars made the cavalry. Historian József Bánlaky (Breit) the 12,000 paces of overstretch, and the huge gap between the completely isolated right flank and the center almost invited the enemy to attempt a breakthrough there.

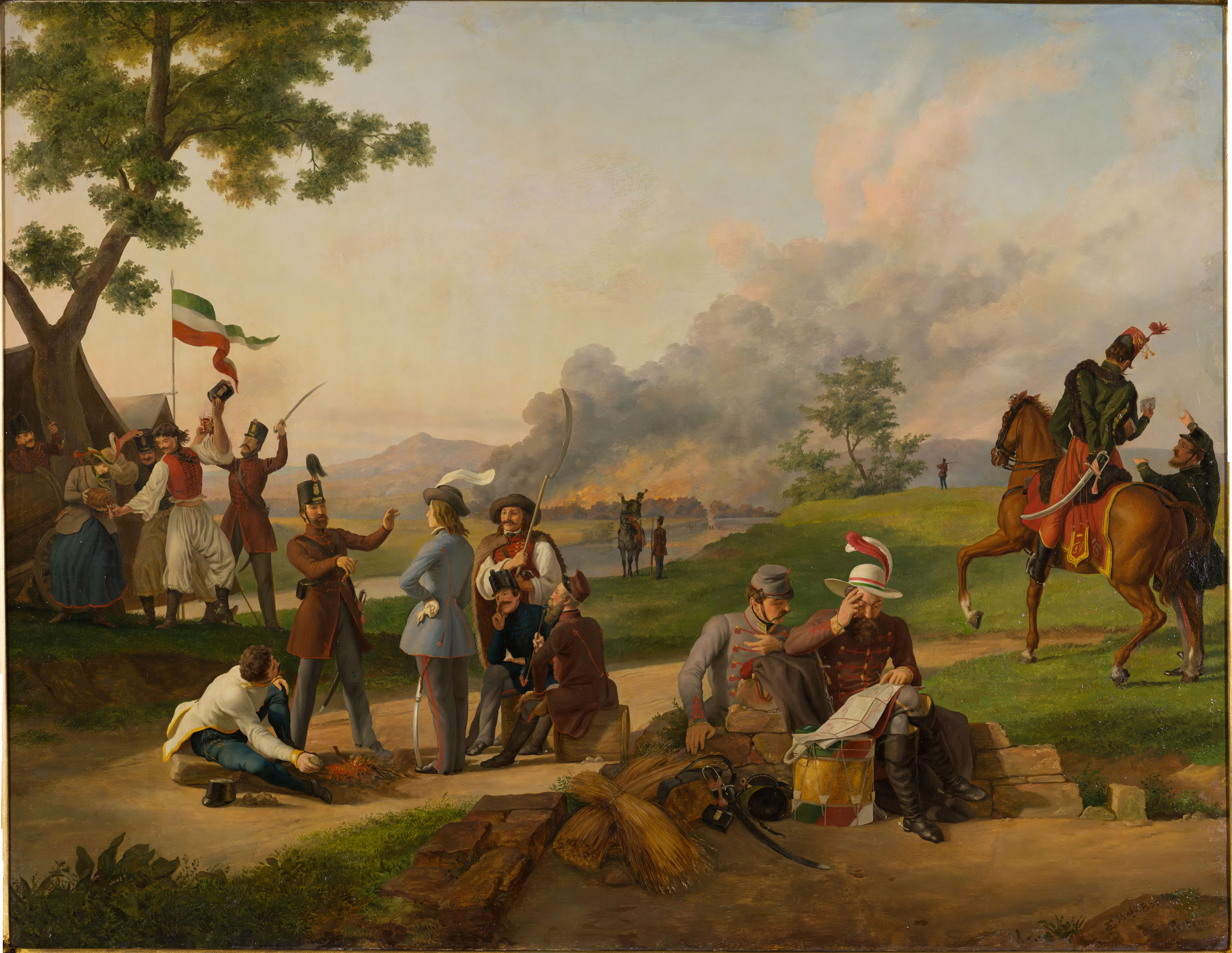
Recruitment in Hungary in 1848 with soldiers and militias by unknown author

The left wing was deployed on the southern shore of Lake Velence, near Gárdony and Agárd, on both sides of the road to Pest in front of Sukoró. This wing, leaning on the lake Velence, was commanded by Colonel Mihály Répásy. In and around Agárd was stationing a unit of almost 4000 soldiers under the lead of Colonel Mór Perczel, in order to prevent an eventual encircling movement by the enemy. This section was also crossed by a road, and the terrain was similar to that on the northern shore. As both sides of the road leading to there were wet and swampy, the enemy attack could hardly have expected success from this direction: no wonder the Croatian army did not attack from this direction. Móga here meant active defense in case of need, as indicated by the fact that in addition to the 6 cannons and one battalion each of soldiers and volunteers, he deployed here nearly 600 hussars. If necessary, the latter could be moved relatively quickly around the lake to its northern shore.

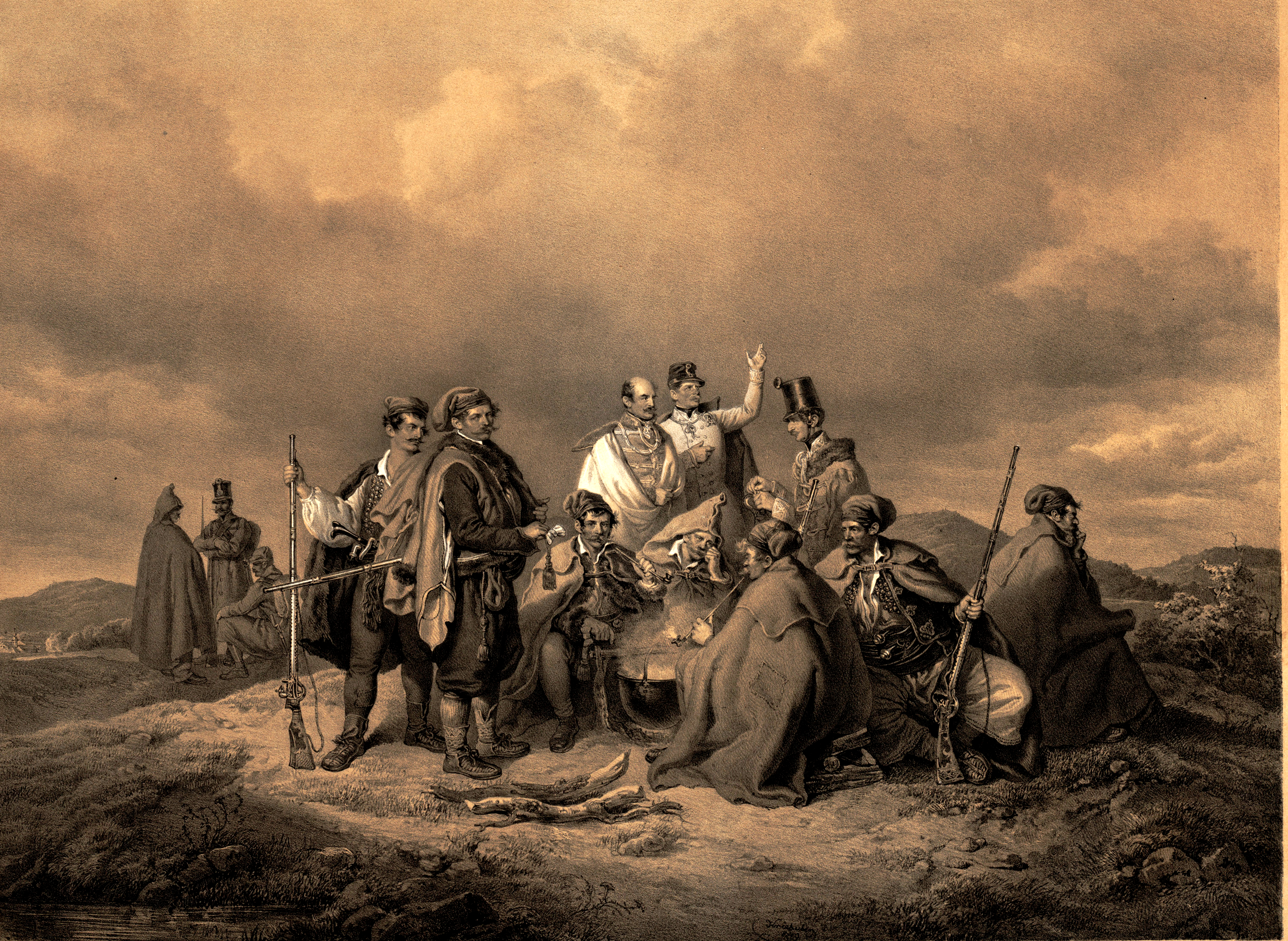
Jelačić's camp Lithography by Kriehuber

The reserve at Velence, was made up of a battalion of the line infantry, a battalion of Honvéd's and 3 battalions of volunteers, and 400 hussars, led by Major General Ádám Teleki. Relatively close to the left wing on the southern shore of Lake Velence was another Hungarian grouping. The commander of this detachment was Major Artúr Görgei. Since 27 August, Görgei had been the commander of the Danube–Tisza Interfluve Volunteer Mobile National Guard's Szolnok camp, and from 24 September he was the commander of Csepel Island. As the commander of the latter, his task was to prevent a possible crossing of the Roth division to the right bank of the Danube. On 26 September Görgei's troops were composed of 600 mobile national guards and 8 cannons, but on the same day, prime minister Batthyányi put under his command 1520 Hunyadi militias, and also around 800 volunteer mobile national guards with 4 cannons. Görgei divided these units, sending parts of them to Dunaföldvár and Adony. On 27 September Móga ordered Görgei to attack the right wing of the enemy with all forces at his disposition because he believed that the main battle with Jelačić will be the next day. On 28 September, one company of the Jászkun battalion was stationed in Tököl, one in Szigetújfalu, one in Ercsi, and one at Lórév; each company, except the one from Ercsi, had four guns. Between 5–6 o'clock that evening, Görgei with 140–150 men of the Hunyadi militia went on a reconnaissance from Adony, but later he split this unit, sending 20 men towards Velence, 60–70 towards Seregélyes, while himself rode with 80 men towards Sárosd, arriving there on 29 at midnight. He reinforced the detachment from Seregélyes with 40 men and in order to secure their position, he sent 60 militias to Szolgaegyháza.

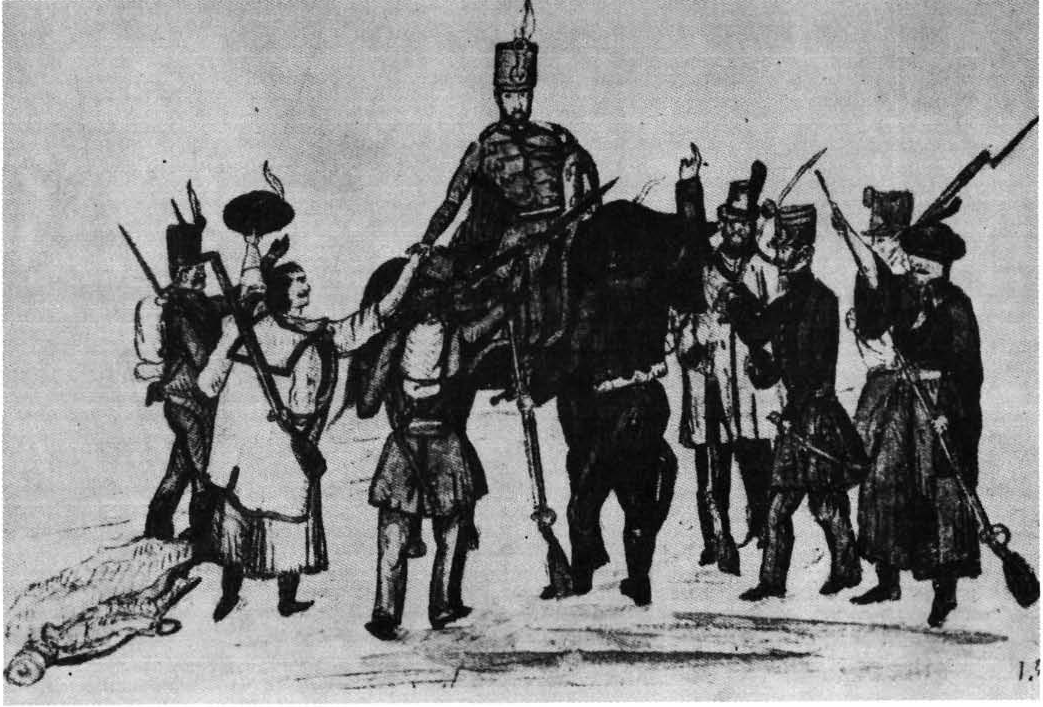
Hungarian national guardsmen, soldiers and hussars during the Croatian invasion from 1848–unknown author

Görgei and the squad he led, went all the way to Aba, HungaryAba, and from there he announced a mass popular uprising against the Croatians. He placed 30 men of the Hunyadi militias in Aba, Sárkeresztúr, and in other smaller localities in order to organize the uprisings, and the remaining 50 were sent to Soponya to observe the road to Székesfehérvár. After Görgei departed from Adony, on 28 at 9 p.m. arrived there from Dunaföldvár the 3. company of the Hunyadi militia, the 2. Major division of the 9. (Nicholas) Hussar regiment and 4 cannons, and on 29 arrived here also the remaining three companies of the Hunyadi militia. The Szabolcs county battalion arrived from Dunaföldvár to Adony on 29 September. As a result of these, on 29 September at night Görgei had at his disposition 600 men from the Jászkun, 800 from the Szabolcs mobile national guards, 1500 men from the Hunyadi militia 202 riders from the 2. Major division of the 9. (Nicholas) Hussar regiment (in total 3100 men at arms) and 16 cannons. Görgei knew that he had not enough men to cause serious problems to the Croatian right wing, but he wanted to establish a web of sentries to prevent the communication between the army of Jelačić and the approaching corps of Roth, capturing the correspondence between them, thus gathering important information which could be decisive in the upcoming confrontation of the two armies.

At the same time, other Hungarian units were rushing towards Pákozd to reinforce the army. The 1. battalion of the 15. (2. Székely) Border Guard Regiment came from Bácska Theater (Serbian front), but they could join the army after the battle, on the 30. September or 1 October. A small force approached the Hungarian main forces from the north: from Zala County, two companies of the Tapolca district battalion, led by Captain József Meszlényi, joined the main force at Nadap around 27 September, however, the three companies led by Major Ferenc Vigyázó on September 28 only reached Magyaralmás, and from there they departed on 29 September through Zámoly towards Pátka.

=== Opposing forces ===
The Hungarian army
Commander Lieutenant General János Móga,
Chief of staff: Major Josef Kollmann

102 infantry companies, 15 cavalry companies, 46 cannons.
Total: 17,516 soldiers

Detailed order of battle of the Hungarian army

Army section	Unit	Leader	Infantry company	Cavalry company	Horse	Cannon	Number
Right wing Commander: Lieutenant Colonel Josef Millpökh; Chief of staff: Captain Ernő Szirányi	3. battalion of the 48 (Ernest) Infantry Regiment	Major Franz Begg	6	-	-	-	670
Right wing Commander: Lieutenant Colonel Josef Millpökh; Chief of staff: Captain Ernő Szirányi	1. battalion of the 60 (Wasa) Infantry Regiment	Captain Alois Wiedersperg	6	-	-	-	500
Right wing Commander: Lieutenant Colonel Josef Millpökh; Chief of staff: Captain Ernő Szirányi	1. (1. of Pest) battalion of the Volunteer Mobile National Guards from Cisdanubia	Major Imre Ivánka	6	-	-	-	1000
Right wing Commander: Lieutenant Colonel Josef Millpökh; Chief of staff: Captain Ernő Szirányi	2. (2. of Pest) battalion of the Volunteer Mobile National Guards from Cisdanubia	Major Richard Guyon	6	-	-	-	1000
Right wing Commander: Lieutenant Colonel Josef Millpökh; Chief of staff: Captain Ernő Szirányi	3. (of Hont and Esztergom county) battalion of the Volunteer Mobile National Guards from Cisdanubia	Captain Ignác Heley	6	-	-	-	1000
Right wing Commander: Lieutenant Colonel Josef Millpökh; Chief of staff: Captain Ernő Szirányi	4. (of Nógrád county) battalion of the Volunteer Mobile National Guards from Cisdanubia	Captain Pál Horváth	6	-	-	-	1000
Right wing Commander: Lieutenant Colonel Josef Millpökh; Chief of staff: Captain Ernő Szirányi	3. (of Tolna county) battalion of the Volunteer Mobile National Guards from Transdanubia	Major Miklós Perczel	6	-	-	-	1180
Right wing Commander: Lieutenant Colonel Josef Millpökh; Chief of staff: Captain Ernő Szirányi	9. (Nicholas) Hussar Regiment	Major Imre Szegedy	-	2	200	-	200
Right wing Commander: Lieutenant Colonel Josef Millpökh; Chief of staff: Captain Ernő Szirányi	3. six-pounder infantry ½ battery	First lieutenant Bazil Strakoniczky	-	-	60	4	40
Right wing Commander: Lieutenant Colonel Josef Millpökh; Chief of staff: Captain Ernő Szirányi	Cisdanubia Volunteer Mobile National Guards's Ivánka Infantry Battery	Lieutenant József Mihálovics	-	-	-	4	40
Right wing Commander: Lieutenant Colonel Josef Millpökh; Chief of staff: Captain Ernő Szirányi	Total		42	2	260	8	6630
Center Commander: Major General Franz Holtsche; Chief of staff: Lieutenant József Bayer	2. battalion of the 34 (Duke of Prussia) Infantry Regiment	Major József Széll	4	-	-	-	400
Center Commander: Major General Franz Holtsche; Chief of staff: Lieutenant József Bayer	Cordier Grenadier Battalion	Major Johann Weissel	4	-	-	-	307
Center Commander: Major General Franz Holtsche; Chief of staff: Lieutenant József Bayer	1. Honvéd Battalion	Major György Lázár	6	-	-	-	900
Center Commander: Major General Franz Holtsche; Chief of staff: Lieutenant József Bayer	Borsod battalion of the Volunteer Mobile National Guards from the Eastern Tisza region	Major Lajos Vay	6	-	-	-	1262
Center Commander: Major General Franz Holtsche; Chief of staff: Lieutenant József Bayer	9. (Nicholas) Hussar Regiment	Major József Békeffy	-	2	200	-	200
Center Commander: Major General Franz Holtsche; Chief of staff: Lieutenant József Bayer	Lieutenant colonel division of the 4. (Alexander) Hussar Regiment	Captain Teodor Schloissnig	-	2	200	-	200
Center Commander: Major General Franz Holtsche; Chief of staff: Lieutenant József Bayer	4. six-pounder k.u.k. infantry battery	First Lieutenant Karl Jungwirth	-	-	66	6	112
Center Commander: Major General Franz Holtsche; Chief of staff: Lieutenant József Bayer	1. six-pounder honvéd cavalry battery	Lieutenant László Adorján	-	-	115	8	145
Center Commander: Major General Franz Holtsche; Chief of staff: Lieutenant József Bayer	2. six-pounder cavalry battery	First lieutenant József Mack	-	-	76	6	117
Center Commander: Major General Franz Holtsche; Chief of staff: Lieutenant József Bayer	1. six-pounder Honvéd infantry ½ battery	Lieutenant Fülöp Gruber	-	-	58	4	72
Center Commander: Major General Franz Holtsche; Chief of staff: Lieutenant József Bayer	3. six-pounder Honvéd infantry ½ battery	Lieutenant Fülöp Gruber	-	-	32	4	99
Center Commander: Major General Franz Holtsche; Chief of staff: Lieutenant József Bayer	Total		20	4	747	28	3814
Left wing Commander: Major Mihály Répássy; Chief of staff: Lieutenant Albrecht	2. Honvéd battalion	Major Karl Zinnern	6	-	-	-	964
Left wing Commander: Major Mihály Répássy; Chief of staff: Lieutenant Albrecht	Zrínyi Militia	Mór Perczel (without a rank)	6	-	-	-	950
Left wing Commander: Major Mihály Répássy; Chief of staff: Lieutenant Albrecht	6. (Württemberg) Hussar Regiment	Major Mihály Répássy	-	5	580	-	580
Left wing Commander: Major Mihály Répássy; Chief of staff: Lieutenant Albrecht	2. six-pounder k.u.k. cavalry battery	First Lieutenant Karl Jungwirth	-	-	66	6	113
Left wing Commander: Major Mihály Répássy; Chief of staff: Lieutenant Albrecht	Total		18	5	656	6	2607
Reserve Commander: Major General Ádám Teleki	1. battalion of the 34 (Duke of Prussia) Infantry Regiment	Captain Vince Győzey	6	-	-	-	600
Reserve Commander: Major General Ádám Teleki	14. Honvéd Battalion	Major László Inczédy	6	-	-	-	665
Reserve Commander: Major General Ádám Teleki	Transdanubia Vol. Mobile National Guards; –1. (Veszprém) battalion –2. (Moson-Győr-Sopron) battalion –4. (Somogy) battalion	–Major Mór Kosztolányi –Captain Géza Kun –Major Manó Zichy –Major Károly Tallián	16	-	-	-	2800
Reserve Commander: Major General Ádám Teleki	4. (Alexander) Hussar Regiment	Major Mihály Répássy	-	4	400	-	400
Reserve Commander: Major General Ádám Teleki	Kosztolányi's unmounted cannons		-	-	-	4	-
Reserve Commander: Major General Ádám Teleki	Total		22	4	400	4	4465
Army total			102	15	2287	46	17,516

The Hungarian army numbered about 17,500 men, 2,060 horses, and 42 guns; four unequipped guns were in reserve. Because the Hungarian left wing and the reserves did not participate in the battle, Móga used only 10,444 soldiers and 36 cannons.

The Croatian army
Commander Lieutenant General Josip Jelačić,
Chief of staff: Major General Karl Zeisberg

50,458 soldiers, 2339 horses, 60 cannons.

Detailed order of battle of the Croatian army

Division	Brigade	Unit	Leader	Horses	Cannon	Soldiers
1. Division; Lieutenant General Karl Hartlieb
1. Division; Lieutenant General Karl Hartlieb	Dietrich brigade Major General Dietrich	1. battalion of the 2. (Otočac) border guard regiment	Major Ettingshausen	-	-	1150
1. Division; Lieutenant General Karl Hartlieb	Dietrich brigade Major General Dietrich	3. battalion of the 5. (Varaždin-Križevci) border guard regiment	Lieutenant colonel Stoisavliević	-	-	1331
1. Division; Lieutenant General Karl Hartlieb	Dietrich brigade Major General Dietrich	4. battalion of the 5. (Varaždin-Križevci) border guard regiment	Captain Spachholz	-	-	1327
1. Division; Lieutenant General Karl Hartlieb	Dietrich brigade Major General Dietrich	Militia of the 5. (Varaždin-Križevci) border guard regiment		-	-	3074
1. Division; Lieutenant General Karl Hartlieb	Dietrich brigade Major General Dietrich	2. six-pounder infantry battery	Lieutenant Gebauer	52	6	92
1. Division; Lieutenant General Karl Hartlieb	Dietrich brigade Major General Dietrich	1. Major division of the 6. (Wrbna) chevau-légers regiment		210	-	200
1. Division; Lieutenant General Karl Hartlieb	Dietrich brigade Major General Dietrich	Brigade total		262	6	7174
1. Division; Lieutenant General Karl Hartlieb	Kriegern brigade Major General Kriegern	3. battalion of the 6. (Varaždin-Đurđevac) border guard regiment	Lieutenant colonel Reiche	-	-	1203
1. Division; Lieutenant General Karl Hartlieb	Kriegern brigade Major General Kriegern	4. battalion of the 6. (Varaždin-Đurđevac) border guard regiment	Captain Bogdanović	-	-	774
1. Division; Lieutenant General Karl Hartlieb	Kriegern brigade Major General Kriegern	4. battalion of the 1. (Lika) border guard regiment	Colonel Rheinbach	-	-	1324
1. Division; Lieutenant General Karl Hartlieb	Kriegern brigade Major General Kriegern	Militias of the 6. (Varaždin-Đurđevac) border guard regiment		-	-	3300
1. Division; Lieutenant General Karl Hartlieb	Kriegern brigade Major General Kriegern	Seressaners of the 4. (Slunj) border guard regiment		-	-	139
1. Division; Lieutenant General Karl Hartlieb	Kriegern brigade Major General Kriegern	a company of the Ban's hussar regiment		125	-	125
1. Division; Lieutenant General Karl Hartlieb	Kriegern brigade Major General Kriegern	1. three-pounder infantry battery	Lieutenant Hassek	28	6	69
1. Division; Lieutenant General Karl Hartlieb	Kriegern brigade Major General Kriegern	Brigade total		153	6	6934
1. Division; Lieutenant General Karl Hartlieb	Division total			415	12	14,108
2. Division; Major General Johann Kempen von Fichtenstamm
2. Division; Major General Johann Kempen von Fichtenstamm	Neustaedter brigade Major General Josef Neustaedter	2. battalion of the 7. (Slavonski Brod) border guard regiment	Captain Bogunović	-	-	1313
2. Division; Major General Johann Kempen von Fichtenstamm	Neustaedter brigade Major General Josef Neustaedter	3. battalion of the 3. (Ogulin) and 4. (Slunj) border guard regiment	Captain Rezniczek	-	-	1904
2. Division; Major General Johann Kempen von Fichtenstamm	Neustaedter brigade Major General Josef Neustaedter	4. battalion of the 2. (Otočac) border guard regiment		-	-	1177
2. Division; Major General Johann Kempen von Fichtenstamm	Neustaedter brigade Major General Josef Neustaedter	Militia of the 3. (Ogulin) border guard regiment	Major Terbuhović	-	-	747
2. Division; Major General Johann Kempen von Fichtenstamm	Neustaedter brigade Major General Josef Neustaedter	Militia of the 3. (Ogulin) border guard regiment	Captain Leypold/Captain Bermann	-	-	747
2. Division; Major General Johann Kempen von Fichtenstamm	Neustaedter brigade Major General Josef Neustaedter	Seressaner of the 3. (Ogulin) border guard regiment	Lieutenant Roknić	-	-	44
2. Division; Major General Johann Kempen von Fichtenstamm	Neustaedter brigade Major General Josef Neustaedter	Seressaner of the 1. (Lika) border guard regiment		-	-	57
2. Division; Major General Johann Kempen von Fichtenstamm	Neustaedter brigade Major General Josef Neustaedter	a company of the Ban's hussar regiment	Captain Zengevall	125	-	125
2. Division; Major General Johann Kempen von Fichtenstamm	Neustaedter brigade Major General Josef Neustaedter	1. six-pounder infantry battery	Lieutenant Klee	52	6	97
2. Division; Major General Johann Kempen von Fichtenstamm	Neustaedter brigade Major General Josef Neustaedter	Brigade total		177	6	6211
2. Division; Major General Johann Kempen von Fichtenstamm	Rastić brigade Colonel Daniel Rastić	3. battalion of the 1. (Lika) border guard regiment	Lieutenant colonel Budisavliević	-	-	1320
2. Division; Major General Johann Kempen von Fichtenstamm	Rastić brigade Colonel Daniel Rastić	4. battalion of the 10. (Ban's 1.) border guard regiment	Captain Pavellić	-	-	1026
2. Division; Major General Johann Kempen von Fichtenstamm	Rastić brigade Colonel Daniel Rastić	4. battalion of the 11. (Ban's 2.) border guard regiment	Colonel Jarisburg	-	-	1165
2. Division; Major General Johann Kempen von Fichtenstamm	Rastić brigade Colonel Daniel Rastić	Militias of the 10. (Ban's 1.) and the 11. (Ban's 2.) border guard regiments	Major Kussurić	-	-	5467
2. Division; Major General Johann Kempen von Fichtenstamm	Rastić brigade Colonel Daniel Rastić	a company of the Ban's hussar regiment		125	-	125
2. Division; Major General Johann Kempen von Fichtenstamm	Rastić brigade Colonel Daniel Rastić	3. three-pounder infantry battery	Lieutenant Lončar	27	6	75
2. Division; Major General Johann Kempen von Fichtenstamm	Rastić brigade Colonel Daniel Rastić	Brigade total		152	6	9178
2. Division; Major General Johann Kempen von Fichtenstamm	Division total			329	12	15,389
3. Division; Major General Johann Schmidl
3. Division; Major General Johann Schmidl	Grammont brigade Colonel Franz Grammont	3. battalion of the 10. (Ban's 1.) border guard regiment	Lieutenant colonel Geramb	-	-	1311
3. Division; Major General Johann Schmidl	Grammont brigade Colonel Franz Grammont	3. battalion of the 11. (Ban's 2.) border guard regiment	Captain Jarisburg	-	-	1312
3. Division; Major General Johann Schmidl	Grammont brigade Colonel Franz Grammont	4. battalion of the 4. (Slunj) border guard regiment	Lieutenant colonel Mudrovčić	-	-	1316
3. Division; Major General Johann Schmidl	Grammont brigade Colonel Franz Grammont	Militia of the 4. (Slunj) border guard regiment		-	-	2832
3. Division; Major General Johann Schmidl	Grammont brigade Colonel Franz Grammont	Seressaner of the 10. (Ban's 1.) and the 11. (Ban's 2.) border guard regiments	Captain Albert Jelačić	-	-	278
3. Division; Major General Johann Schmidl	Grammont brigade Colonel Franz Grammont	a company of the Ban's hussar regiment	Captain Zengevall	125	-	125
3. Division; Major General Johann Schmidl	Grammont brigade Colonel Franz Grammont	2. three-pounder infantry battery	Lieutenant Eggenberger	28	6	74
3. Division; Major General Johann Schmidl	Grammont brigade Colonel Franz Grammont	Brigade total		153	6	7248
3. Division; Major General Johann Schmidl	Todorović brigade Major general Kuzman Todorović	1. battalion of the 8. (Stara Gradiška) border guard regiment	Major Urm	-	-	1253
3. Division; Major General Johann Schmidl	Todorović brigade Major general Kuzman Todorović	3. battalion of the 2. (Otočac) border guard regiment	Captain Wimmer	-	-	1401
3. Division; Major General Johann Schmidl	Todorović brigade Major general Kuzman Todorović	4. battalion of the 3. (Ogulin) border guard regiment	Lieutenant colonel Knezević	-	-	1106
3. Division; Major General Johann Schmidl	Todorović brigade Major general Kuzman Todorović	Militias of the 1. (Lika) border guard regiments	Major Klobučarić	-	-	4670
3. Division; Major General Johann Schmidl	Todorović brigade Major general Kuzman Todorović	Militias of the 2. (Otočac) border guard regiment	Major Dmitrasinović	-	-	3493
3. Division; Major General Johann Schmidl	Todorović brigade Major general Kuzman Todorović	Seressaner of the 1. (Lika) and 2. (Otočac) border guard regiment	Captain Albert Jelačić	-	-	348
3. Division; Major General Johann Schmidl	Todorović brigade Major general Kuzman Todorović	4. three-pounder infantry battery	Lieutenant Schrinner	?	6	?
3. Division; Major General Johann Schmidl	Todorović brigade Major general Kuzman Todorović	Brigade total		?	6	12,271
3. Division; Major General Johann Schmidl	Sedelmayer brigade Colonel Franz Sedelmayer von Seefeld	Three divisions of the 7. (Hardegg) cuirassier regiment	Lieutenant colonel Adam Stauffer	649	-	649
3. Division; Major General Johann Schmidl	Sedelmayer brigade Colonel Franz Sedelmayer von Seefeld	1. Major division of the 7. (Kress) chevau-léger regiment	Major Kaminski	281	-	292
3. Division; Major General Johann Schmidl	Sedelmayer brigade Colonel Franz Sedelmayer von Seefeld	Three companies of the Ban's hussar regiment	Major Kamenjak	375	-	375
3. Division; Major General Johann Schmidl	Sedelmayer brigade Colonel Franz Sedelmayer von Seefeld	3. six-pounder infantry battery	Lieutenant Miksch	60	6	104
3. Division; Major General Johann Schmidl	Sedelmayer brigade Colonel Franz Sedelmayer von Seefeld	5. mixed battery	Lieutenant Petit	47	6	78
3. Division; Major General Johann Schmidl	Sedelmayer brigade Colonel Franz Sedelmayer von Seefeld	1. Congreve rocket battery	Lieutenant Kaufmann	15	6	33
3. Division; Major General Johann Schmidl	Sedelmayer brigade Colonel Franz Sedelmayer von Seefeld	2. Congreve rocket battery	Artillery sergeant Leinmüller	15	6	32
3. Division; Major General Johann Schmidl	Sedelmayer brigade Colonel Franz Sedelmayer von Seefeld	Brigade total		1442	24	1563
3. Division; Major General Johann Schmidl	Division total			1595	36	20,961
Grand total				2339	60	50,458

A statement about the Croatian army from 27 September shows 51,557 soldiers, of which 48,234 were combat-ready. It is uncertain if this number also includes the soldiers of the division of Major General Franz Karl von Roth. If we count the possible absence of Roth's division, then we have 43,189 personnel and 39,098 combat-ready soldiers. The army had 48 three- and six-pounder guns and 12 Congreve rocket launchers. Even taking to account the absence of the 14,000 soldiers and 12 cannons of the division of Lieutenant General Karl Vinzenz Hartlieb, which departed too late towards the battlefield and arrived there after the end of the battle, the troops under the command of Lieutenant General Josip Jelačić were in numerical superiority, but the superior firepower of the Hungarian army evened the balance of power. As a result, at the battle of Pákozd, Jelačić had at his disposition about 36,000 soldiers and 48 cannons.

== Battle ==
=== Fights between the Hungarian right wing and the Croatian left wing ===
Jelačić, with an army outnumbering the Hungarians by two and a half times, issued a simple marching order for 28 September, anticipating the possibility of a Hungarian resistance. Johann Major General Kempen von Fichtenstamm, the leader of the Croatian left wing, sent his division on the road towards Lovasberény, with the order to reach Vál and Kajászószentpéter on the same day, and with his advance guard Tordas. The other two, the Schmidl and Hartlieb divisions and the united cavalry under Colonel Sedelmayer, had to advance on the Székesfehérvár-Pákozd-Velence mail route. No units were sent to the southern shore of the lake. Jelačić seems to have thought that he could crush the Hungarian right flank with an encircling attack and then push the Hungarian army into Lake Velence, or at least drive it back towards the capital. That day, with the Schmidl's division and cavalry, he intended to advance to Martonvásár, and with Hartlieb's division to Velence. Kempen's and Schmidl's divisions and the cavalry brigade had to leave at 6 a.m., while Hartlieb's division at 7 a.m.

Kempen's troops set off at 6 a.m. on the road to Lovasberény. The division was led by Major General Josef Neustaedter's brigade, followed by Colonel Daniel Rastić's brigade. Kempen's primary objective was to break, with a frontal attack, through the Hungarian right wing, and isolate from each other the units fighting there. The Hungarian hussar outposts which the Neustaedter brigade first met, retreated, and the brigade slowly pushed forward across the Pátka meadow towards the Hungarian front line. The vanguard was a detachment, led by Captain Resniczek, made of the 3. battalion of the Ogulin, and the 3. battalion of the Slunj borderguard regiments. This was followed by a battalion of Ogulin Militia led by Major Terbuhović. The third unit was the 2nd Battalion of the Bród Borderguard Regiment, led by Captain Bogunović. The brigade's artillery consisted of 6 guns of the 1st six-pounder infantry battery, and the brigade's cavalry was a company of Jelačić hussars. At the same time, the company of the Ogulin Seressaners led by Lieutenant Roknić, and the company of Ogulin militias led by Captain Leypold advanced on the high ground along the main road against the forest, which was in front of the Hungarian position.

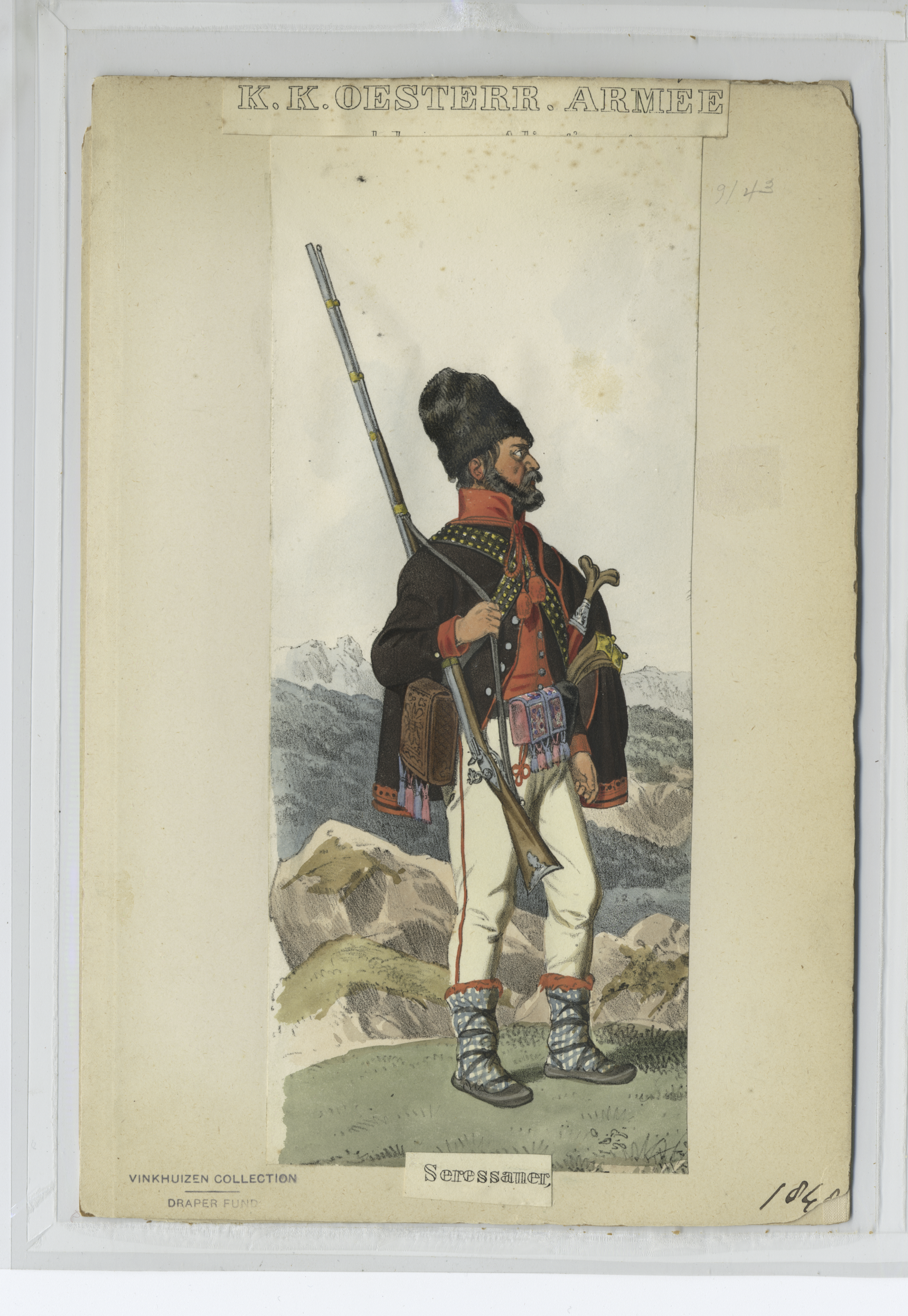
Seressaner

According to the war diary of the Dráva Corps (written down later), at 5 a.m. a patrol of Hussars on outpost at Pátka reported that the enemy had departed from Székesfehérvár, and their commander (Major Imre Szegedy) immediately gave the order to retreat towards Ságvár". Ivánka, however, sent back the hussars towards Pátka, sending a section of them to reconnoiter beyond Csala, which was halfway between Pátka and Pákozd.

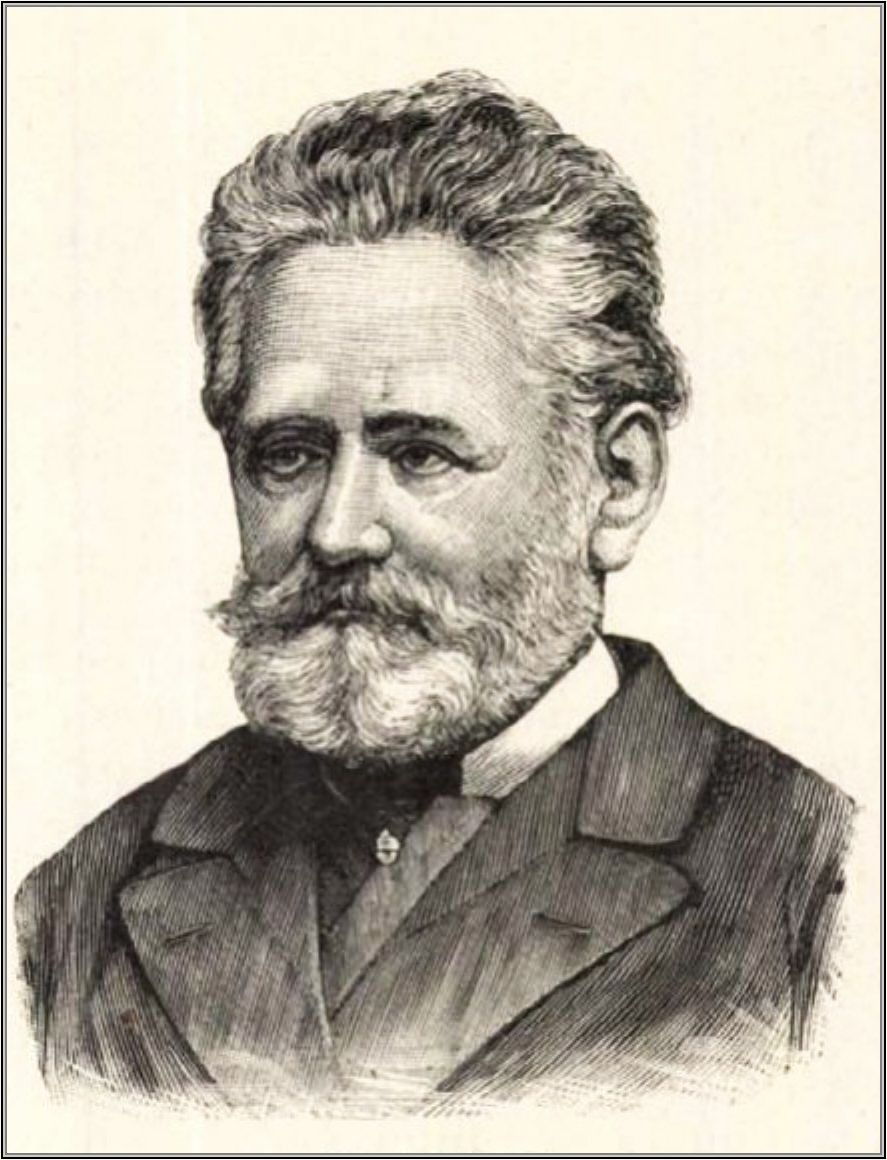
Ivánka Imre, országgyűlési képviselő, Vasárnapi Ujság, 1889

The actual clash between the two armies took place between 9:30 and 10:30 in the morning. According to the Kempen Division's staff log, two squads of about 110 skirmishers made of Seressaners, led by Captain Roknić, engaged the Hungarian outposts on the heights to the right of the road. According to two members of the 2nd Pest Volunteer Battalion, the first Croatian scouts appeared at dawn in front of the Hungarian lines but were driven back by a few rifle shots of the Hungarian outposts. Soon the Croatian battalion was ordered back on a lower hill "about two cannon shots away" (like one and a half to two km). Roknić reported this to Major General Neustaedter, saying that he was facing at least 9 divisions (i.e. 18 companies=3 battalions) of infantry and a few batteries. Roknić was mistaken, as the Hungarian right flank had only two battalions of infantry, the rest of the infantry being volunteer mobile National Guard battalions. The Kecskemét company of the 2nd Pest Battalion, divided into two half companies, positioned on a rocky hill, clashed with the Seressaners led by Captain Roknić, and drove them back with their fire, so that they retreated to the left, towards the right edge of the Hungarian right flank, and there they engaged with them in an intense firefight. Roknić soon told Neustaedter that if he did not get reinforcements, he would not be able to hold his position. Kempen then ordered Neustaedter to send reinforcements to Roknić. According to Kempen's division's staff log, two companies of Leypold's battalion, formed from the militias of the Ogulin borderguard regiment, were sent to support the Seressaners.

Another company of the 2nd Pest Battalion was fighting in the valley–probably with two companies of the Leypold Battalion of the Ogulin Militias, and two (or four) companies of cavalry. The latter company retreated, and the 2nd Pest Battalion itself withdrew. According to the Hungarian war diary (written down later), the engagement lasted for more than an hour and caused a shortage of ammunition for the fighting Hungarian infantry. Ivánka, who had arrived on the scene in the meantime, stopped the company's retreat, sent them ammunition, and the firing of Ivánka's half-battery halted the advancing Croats. Due to the strong Hungarian counterattack, the Croats did not attempt another face-to-face attack here but continued their attempts to encircle the Hungarians. Meanwhile, Ivánka sent the battalion—to help with the ammunition shortage—under the command of Major Richard Guyon on a bayonet charge against the enemy-occupied scrubland. Although it was hit by heavy rifle fire, the battalion captured the thicket but then it was forced to retreat because of the Croatian counterattack that had meanwhile developed (probably by the second Ogulin Militia battalion led by Major Terbuhović). According to Major General Josef Neustaedter's memoirs, after receiving Roknić's report that he could not hold, Neustadter, on the orders of Kempen, who was present, sent the Ogulin Militia Battalion, led by Major Terbuhović, on the heights to the right. From there, Major Terbuhović had to send four companies of infantry organized in a skirmish-line, into the valley and from there to the opposite heights. However, shortly after that, Terbuhovic himself, asked for support saying that without the brigade's support he could not hold his position. Neustaedter then took the lead of the 2nd Battalion of the 7th (Bród) Frontierguard Regiment and moved up the above-mentioned hill from the right, ordering the Ogulin Battalion under Captain Leypold to follow. However, as Leypold had no horse, he ordered the mounted border guard captain Bermann, from the Bród border guard regiment, to lead the Ogulin Battalion. Then Neustaedter led the Bród battalion to the top of the hill.

Meanwhile, the 3rd Battalion of the 3rd (Ogulin) and 4th (Slunj) Borderguard Regiments, led by Major Rezniczek, the 2nd Battalion of the 7th (Bród) Borderguard Regiment, led by Captain Bogunović, and the 3rd Three Pound Infantry Battery, led by Lieutenant Lončar, were climbing the heights to encircle the Hungarians from the right. To ensure the success of the encirclement, Kempen, with a battalion formed from the 3rd Battalions of the 3rd (Ogulin) and 4th (Slunj) Borderguard Regiments, launched further and further attacks in the forest, in order to weaken the Hungarian right wing's furthermost section, and divert their attention.

Kempen reported in his war report from Pátka at 2 p.m. that the Hungarian aide-de-camp Major Count Antal Szapáry appeared shortly after the beginning of the battle and asked Kempen "to avoid any bloodshed, assuring that hostilities would be stopped for sure, if here too they were to be stopped". Kempen was not against this offer and promised to stop fighting until Jelačić's response to the ceasefire offer will arrive. But in the midst of the "negotiations", both he and nearby units came under heavy artillery fire, so he ordered his artillery to deploy and start shooting back. However, Kempen's positive attitude to Szapáry's offer was probably enforced on him by the confusion caused among the Croats by the Hungarian artillery's grapeshot.

The 1st Battalion of the Hungarian 60th (Wasa) Infantry attacked from flank the Croatians in the woods, and the 1st Six-Pounder Infantry Battery, which was assigned to them, their cannons firing grapeshot at the Bród battalion. Neustaedter ordered the unit to withdraw down the valley. However, the Hungarian battery's first volley of cartridges still wounded and killed some 50 of the troops. Captain Bogunović, the commander of the unit, and his aide, Petričević, were also wounded in the fire. According to Kempen, "We had to retreat from our unfavorable position to a sideways position in the continuous fire." After the battalion had retreated from the height, the Hungarian battery started firing cannonballs at the Croatian baggage wagons on the highway from the valley, which retreated in haste towards Pátka. The situation was saved by the 3rd Three-Pounder Infantry Battery, led by Lieutenant Lončar, which took up a firing position not far from the Hungarian battery, caught it in the crossfire and thus deterred it from further firing against Croatian troops and baggage. The Hungarian unit suffered heavy losses from the enemy fire, being forced to retreat, and even abandoning its original position due to the lack of ammunition, according to Miklós Perczel's diary. The Croatian battery of Lieutenant Lončar was secured by the Ogulin Militia Battalion led by Captain Bermann and the 3rd Combined Ogulin-Slunj Border Guard Battalion led by Captain Rezniczek.

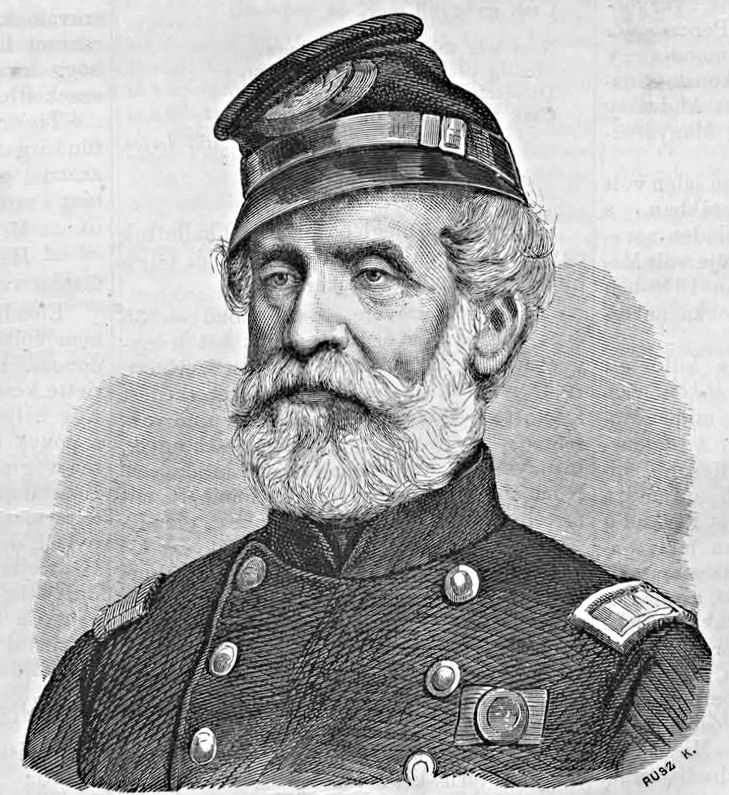
Perczel Miklós

In the meantime, the two Croatian battalions that had been trying to encircle the Hungarians, advanced unhindered to the plateau. The situation was saved by the Tolna Volunteer National Guards led by Major Miklós Perczel. Miklós Perczel divided his battalion into three divisions: two companies led by Sándor Perczel, two by Miklós Perczel himself, and two were left as reserves at the head of the hill. With his four companies, he attacked the two battalions of Croats that had ascended the mountain. After a volley, they attacked the enemy with a bayonet charge, who, after a short fight, began to flee. The fleeing Croats were also fired upon by a Hungarian battery, causing them heavy losses. The Tolna Volunteer National Guards did not pursue the enemy, but took position on their original positions.

The enemy was fired upon by a six-pounder half battery on the extreme right flank, and a squadron of hussars also attacked, whereupon they retreated through the ravines on the main road without halting to the mill on the side, and at last, they halted in the cover of some mounds further back. The aforementioned half (or whole) battery, and the Nicholas Hussars were brought from the center by Gyula Andrássy, who arrived just in time to stop the Croatian advance.

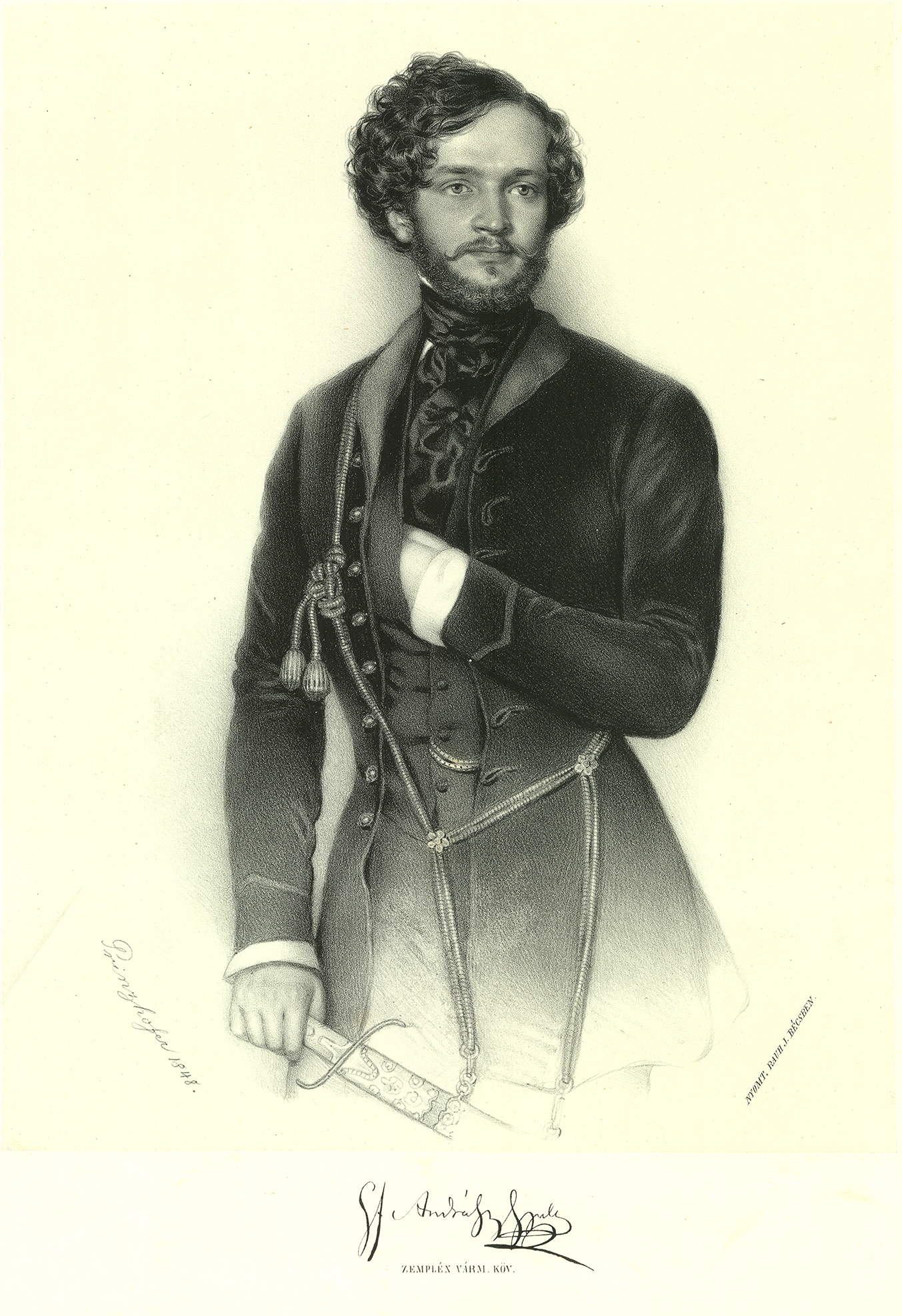
Andrássy Gyula Prinzhofer

Sometime after 4 p.m., the commander of the Hungarian right wing Lieutenant colonel József Milpökh ordered a general attack, which drove the back Croats at every point. It was perhaps at this time that the Otočac Seressaners, who had been drawn into this section of the front line, were confronted by one of the Hungarian volunteer battalions. According to the story of the Otočac border guards regiment's staff log, the Seressaners led by Lieutenant Vlaisavljević thought the Hungarians want to surrender, and the Hungarians thought the Seressaners want to do that. They approached each other, and at one moment the Hungarians called on the Seressaners to lay down their weapons. But the Croatians seized their rifles and attacked the Hungarians, killing 35 of them and taking 1 lieutenant and 12 privates prisoner. According to a Hungarian source, this was not an accident, but the Croats lured the Hungarian battalion into a trap with the promise to surrender, and then carried out a massacre among them. According to one of Jelačić's aides, Hermann Dahlen von Orlaburg, 31 mutilated Hungarians were lying on the ground.

In any case, according to the sources, the Hungarian advance was so fierce that the Croats fled everywhere, and the Hungarian battalions drove the attackers as far as Pátka, almost forcing them into the lake from there. But then the fighting suddenly broke off.

According to a work about the history of the 71st Battalion, Major Imre Ivánka wanted to stop the battle and the advance of the Hungarians, but it took a great effort to stop the advancing 2nd Pest Battalion. According to the memories of a soldier of that battalion, Ivánka himself grabbed a white handkerchief and stopped the advance. The Hungarian battery here was silenced, although the Croats were within firing range. According to Ivánka's memoirs, Kempen sent an officer waving a white handkerchief to the Hungarian side. The officer said that Kempen "wishes the firing to be stopped. on the whole line; he does not want to fight the Hungarians; he has been told that the demagogues are terrorizing the [Hungarian] Diet and the government and that he came to the country to liberate it; but now he sees that the whole [Hungarian] nation is in arms against them [the Croatian army], that the regular troops of the Imperial Army are standing and fighting in our [the Hungarian] ranks, [and] he does not want to cause a split in the army, etc." Ivánka replied that he was not the commander-in-chief, that it was difficult for him too to fight against his comrades from the Habsburg imperial army, but it was not the Hungarians who had invaded Croatia; otherwise, he would report the willingness of Kempen to stop the fight, to the commander-in-chief. He then reported to Milpökh what had happened, sent his aide-de-camp Pál Rainer to Móga, and rode to the Croatian border guard officer. The soldiers engaged in conversation with the Seressaners who accompanied the Croatian officers. According to Ivánka, it was then that the half-battery brought to the right flank by Gyula Andrássy started firing at Kempen's troops from the valley, whereupon the Seressaners disarmed Ivánka and took him with them. The fighting here ended shortly after dusk.

=== The incident at Pátka ===
Towards the end of the battle, an important event also occurred in the rear of the Croatian left flank at Pátka. On 28 September, the half-battalion of the Zala National Guard led by Major Ferenc Vigyázó, of about 600 men, which had departed from the district of Tapolca, but because of the Croatian advance could not unite with the Hungarian main army, remained near Magyaralmás. (The other half-battalion, led by Captain József Meszlényi, manage to join the main army around 27 September.)

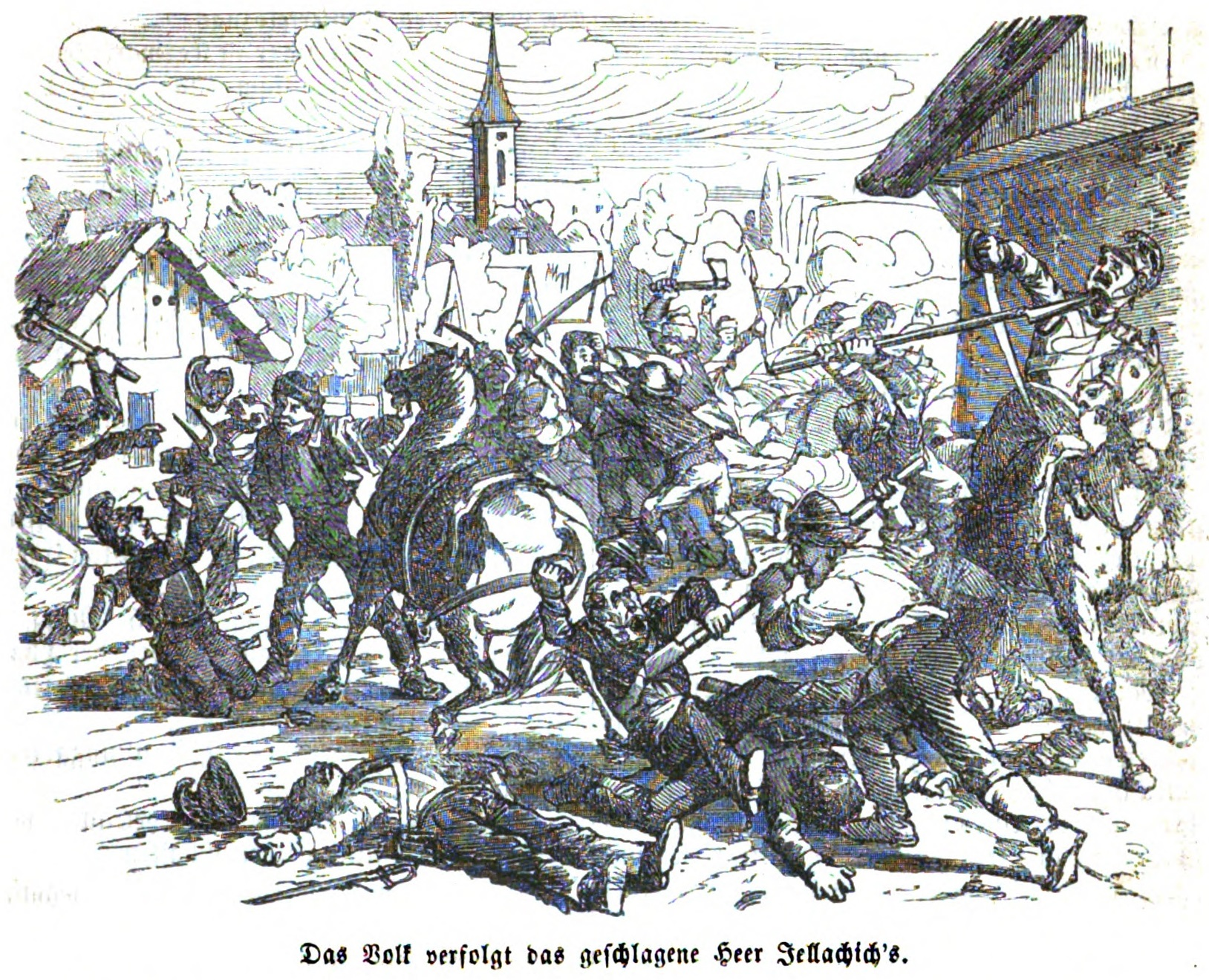
The Hungarian villagers attack the troops of Jelačić–German caricature

Captain Móric Kisfaludy arrived in Zámoly with his company on 29 September at 11 am. Here he heard that the Croatians are plundering Pátka. He rode there with one of his officers and saw that about 120–150 Croatian wagons were moving towards the bridge from Pátka. Kisfaludy sent an officer for his troops, and he himself, with the villagers, who started to gather to help him, and a resident of Zámoly on horseback, hurried to the wagons. Here, the Croats received them with rifle shots, but they missed. Kisfaludy cut down an enemy rider, to whereof the wagons turned back, but one of them overturned. The column, which was retreating through the village, was attacked by the locals and beaten to death 30 Croats. Kisfaludy then hurried back to Zámoly, from where he with Vigyázó and three of his companies, and the villagers of Zámoly, who rose up to help him against the Croatians, set off again for Pátka, and tried to surround the Croats there, but they had already left the village. Kisfaludy and Vigyázó then reversed the overturned ammunition wagon, left behind by the Croats, and took it with them. Among the loot captured by Kisfaludy and the villagers were also weapons and military maps. Because of the proximity of the Croats, they left the village at 9 p.m. and returned to Zámoly and on the 30th then to Csákvár. The enemy did not return to Pátka until 10 p.m. on the 29th. Thus, only the population of the village took part in the fightings from Pátka. The returning Croatians took revenge on the villagers of Pátka by plundering the inhabitants, and taking 28 of them as hostages, releasing them only on 30 September, when the armistice was signed. From the Kempen division's staff log, it seems that the local action took place only after Kempen had decided to call off the battle at Pákozd, i.e. there were no fighting Croatian troops in the village, only the escorts of the ammunition and baggage train. Some sources say that except these, there were many Croatians from Kempen's troops, who were retreating after the Hungarian artillery put them to flight.

=== Battle in the Center ===
The Schmidl division departing from Székesfehérvár via Kisfalud to Pákozd on the mail route according to the unanimous testimony of the sources, broke out from Pákozd at about 12 noon and started to attack the Hungarian center. The 1st Battalion of the 8th (Gradiška) Borderguard Regiment from Major General Kuzman Todorović's brigade led the assault column, followed by the 1st (Lika) and 2nd (Otočac) Borderguard Regiments. Also here were assigned the Seressaners of the 1st (Lika) and 2nd (Otočac) Borderguard Regiments. Three companies from the 3rd Battalion of the 2nd (Otočac) Frontierguard Regiment took part in the battle, but we do not know where they were positioned. The same can be said of the 4th Battalion of the 3rd (Ogulin) Borderguard Regiment. Perhaps these two units were sent to occupy the vineyards, which lay left (north) to the post road. The artillery of the brigade was the 2nd Three Pounder Infantry Battery. Also deployed here were the 3rd Six Pounder Battery, attached to the Cavalry Brigade, and one of the Congreve rocket batteries. Of the four battalions of the brigade under the command of Colonel Baron Franz Gramont, the 4th Battalion of the 4th (Slunj) Borderguard Regiment and the 3rd Battalion of the 11th (2nd Ban) Borderguard Regiment came under fire. These troops were probably also sent to occupy the vineyards. To this brigade, as artillery, the 4th three-pounder battery was attached. South of the post road, the 1st Major's Division of the 7th (Kress) Light Cavalry (chevau léger) Regiment and three (or two) divisions of the 7th (Hardegg) Cuirassier Regiment were deployed, which belonged to the cavalry brigade of Colonel Franz Sedelmayer von Seefeld. Also assigned to this brigade were the 3rd six-pounder battery, the 5th mixed battery, and the 1st and 2nd Congreve rocket batteries.

At the center, the Hungarian outposts reported at 11:30 that the Croats were already in Pákozd. According to the war diary (written down later) of the Dráva Corps, the Croatian army "with strong infantry columns from the ravine near Pákozd, advanced on the main road, parallel to it, and simultaneously along the length of the vineyards between the main road and the road to Lovasberény, advancing to the edge of the vineyards, occupied all the fences of the vineyards and opened fire on our skirmishers (probably the soldiers of the 1st Honvéd battalion) deployed along the tree-lined stream". They shot on the soldiers also with Congreve rockets. At the same time, Móga's war report highlights the intense rocket fire of the enemy on the center of the Hungarian army; and Hermann Dahlen also mentions in his diary that he saw a (probably the 1st) Honvéd battalion retreating in haste, after being hit by two rockets. "This advance," writes the staff log, "would have had adverse consequences for the Hungarian center, if the enemy had pushed forward with additional infantry columns on the vineyard, behind his first front line forming an acute angle with the Hungarian position, as far as its final outcrop, and had advanced from the vineyards on the road connecting the Hungarian right wing and the center, and had thus separated them both."

Móga was aware of this danger and placed a battery (probably the 4th k.u.k. Six-Pounder Infantry Battery led by Lieutenant Karl Jungwirth) at a point where it could fire on the Croatian troops from the vineyards. At the beginning of the battle, the 4th (Alexander) Hussars Regiment's Lieutenant-Colonel class, two companies of the 9th (Nicholas) Hussar regiment, two companies of the Cordier grenadier battalion, and the 1st six-pound infantry half battery led by Lieutenant Philip Gruber were stationed on the left (southern) side of the highway. Just before the battle, the 2nd six-pounder Honvéd cavalry battery led by First Lieutenant József Makk was directed here. Makk also took over the command of the other half battery from here. At the beginning of the battle, two companies of the Cordier Grenadier Battalion were redirected to the forces on the right side of the road, while from the reserve from Velence, Móga moved forward the 1st battalion of the 34. (Prince of Prussia) Infantry Regiment, led by Captain Vince Győzey. Furthermore - a little later–Móga did the same with the three battalions of the Transdanubian Volunteer Mobile National Guard led by Major Mór Kosztolányi, and probably with the 14th Honvéd Battalion.

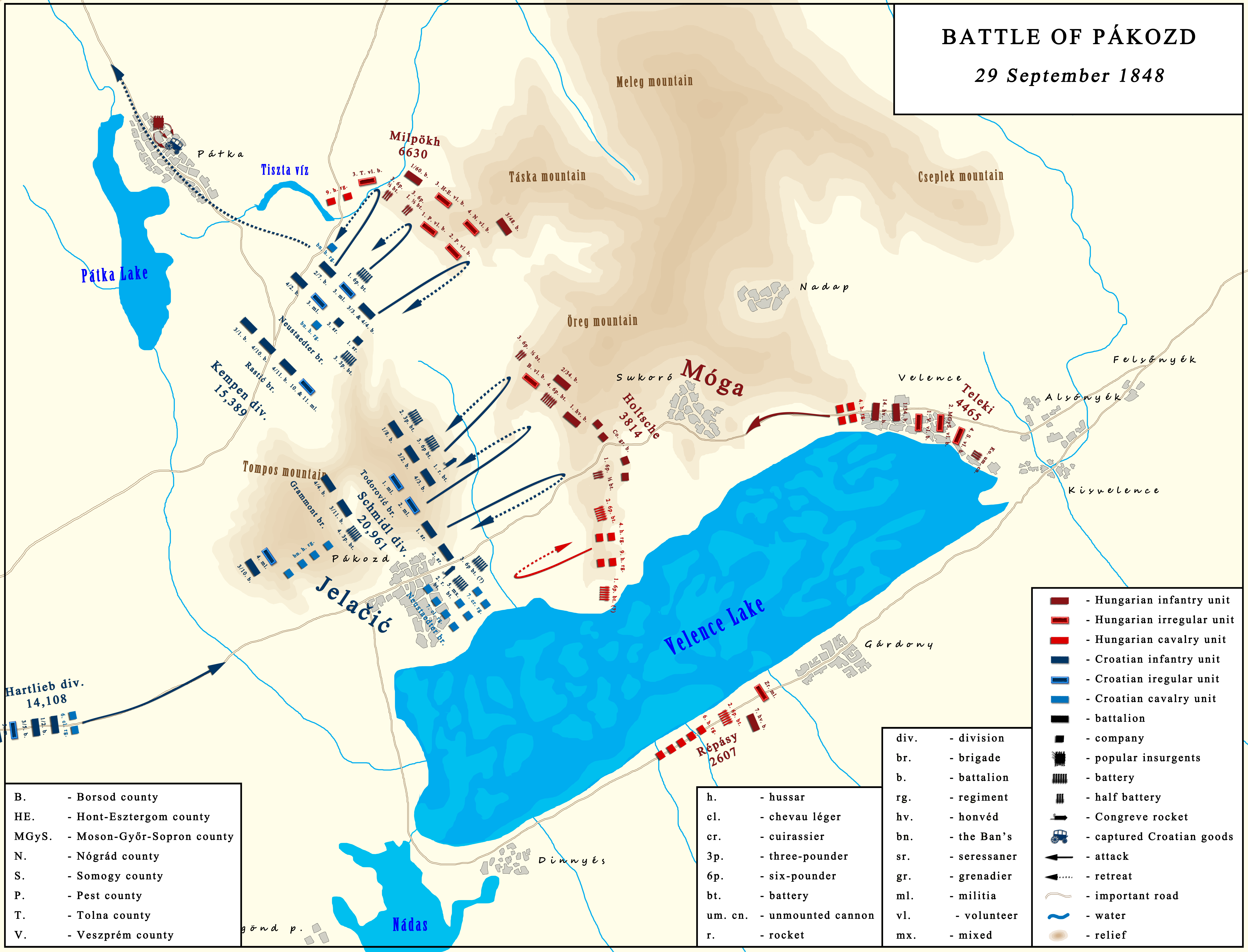
Battle of Pákozd (29. September 1848)

Móga, having seen the enemy's marching, sent the Lieutenant-Colonel Division of the 4th (Alexander) Hussars forward to the area between the highway and the lake. According to the staff log, the purpose of the advance was to force the enemy to deploy his troops and show his strength; in his memoirs, Lajos Zámbelly, however, believes that the aim was to draw the enemy forces to this point. Their commander Major József Schweidel, reported that they had penetrated within firing range of the enemy and, despite the enemy's fire, they managed to gather precious pieces of information that they were facing a large number of enemy troops and had also gained valuable information about the troop deployment.

In the meantime, however, the enemy had also brought forward some cavalry, a six-pounder infantry and a six-pounder half Congreve rocket battery (however according to Zámbelly, only the latter), with which he fired vigorously at the Hussars 800 paces away. According to a memory, the Croatian guns were deployed behind the cavalry's cover, and that is why the Hungarian hussars were caught by surprise by their fire. However, the rockets did not do much harm to the Hungarians: Jelačić later reported to the Imperial Minister of War Baillet von Latour that he had been forced to withdraw one of the rocket batteries from the firing line because it was unable to reach the enemy with its shells, while at the same time, it was very exposed to enemy fire.

Meanwhile, Móga sent Major József Békeffy with two companies of the 9th (Nicholas) Hussar Regiment, to gather information about the enemy as Schweidel's 4th (Alexander) Hussars did earlier, but they were forced to turn back without finishing their work. According to Lajos Zámbelly, the enemy battery and rockets were silenced by the shots of the 2nd Six-Pounder Honvéd cavalry battery led by Lieutenant József Makk. After that Móga wanted to send Schweidel's two companies forward again, but Major General Holtsche, the commander of the center, dissuaded him.

Shortly afterward, a duel between Hungarian and Croatian batteries began. In this duel on the Hungarian side participated József Makk's 2nd six-pounder Hungarian cavalry battery and Fülöp Gruber's 1st half six-pounder Hungarian infantry battery, and perhaps even the 4th six-pounder k.u.k. infantry battery under the command of Lieutenant Karl Jungwirth. At first, the Hungarian artillerymen did not respond to the Croatian artillery's fire, but when the Croatian batteries came within range, the Hungarian cannons shot with so a great skill, that after only a few shots the enemy artillery retreated in haste.

This was followed, with some delay, by a Croatian attack from the vineyards. Most of the Hungarian infantry probably was deployed here. To the right (north) of the road was the 1st Honvéd Battalion, and to the right of it the Borsod Volunteer Mobile National Guard Battalion. The 2nd Battalion of the 34th (Prince of Prussia) Infantry Regiment stood behind them. The two companies of the Cordier Grenadier Battalion were deployed behind the 1st Honvéd Battalion. At the start of the battle, two companies of the grenadier battalion, which were south of the road near the 1st Six-Pounder Half Infantry Battery, were also sent to the right side of the road to reinforce the Hungarian infantry. The 4th k.u.k. Six-Pounder Infantry Battery, commanded by First Lieutenant Karl Jungwirth, took up position between the 1st Honvéd Battalion and the Borsod Battalion, while a Honvéd battery was positioned to the right (north) of the Borsod Battalion. The latter was probably not a full but only a half-battery, namely the 3rd six-pounder Honvéd half battery. The position of the 1st six-pounder Honvéd cavalry battery is not known in the order of battle; later, during the battle, this (or half of it) was transferred to the right flank by Móga.

The 1st Battalion led by Major György Lázár was approached to 1000 paces by a Seressaner company, marching in battle line. Lázár sent one company forward in a line of battle to a field ditch, with orders to fire only when the enemy was in range. About the Borsod Volunteer Mobile National Guard we only know that one of their companies also advanced in a battle line, and the rest of the battalion took up position behind the trench mentioned by Lazar, and from there they fired at the Seressaners and the border guards.

In the meantime, half an hour from Pákozd, Jelačić and his entourage met a lieutenant of the 9th (Miklós) Hussars regiment, accompanied by a hussar trumpeter, who was sent out by Móga as an envoy to find out whether Jelačić had met Batthyány and to call on him to stop the battle. Jelačić received the parley in a nearby farm, and was still there when news came that on the previous day, Lamberg had been murdered in Pest. Jelačić and his entourage were terribly outraged at this, and their anger increased even more when a remark clumsily slipped out by the Hussar trumpeter revealed to them that the news of Lamberg's murder had been known in the Hungarian camp the night before. Jelačić soon wrote a few angry words to Móga, expressing the hope that after this devastating event, he would realize, that the cause he was defending was wrong and traitorous, and, as an Austrian general, would return to the path of honor and duty, and not the "rebellion". According to Hermann Dahlen's diary, a quarter of an hour later they heard cannon fire from the left wing and rushed forward. Jelačić sent out orders through Dahlen, and by the time the latter returned, the guns were already rattling and the rockets were hissing also in the center.

In the meantime, Jelačić and his escort arrived on the battlefield and rushed to the Croatian vanguards, which they estimated to be 900 paces from the Hungarian lines. They watched as the shots of the Croatian six-pounder infantry battery struck in the ranks of the 4th (Alexander) Hussars' regiment's lieutenant-colonel class, and as one of the Congreve rocket batteries drove the Hungarian infantry back. Jelačić and his escort advanced as far as the Croatian artillery line, before the Hungarian artillery opened fire on the conspicuous group of riders. Cannonball after cannonball struck close to them, and Jelačić, after a while, no longer wanting to risk his life, decided to ride to the rear. Jelačić rode in front, Wilhelm Hompesch on one side, Oldershausen on the other, and Hermann Dahlen behind him. Suddenly they came under more cannon fire, and one bullet shot off the leg of a commanding officer's horse, and another struck Oldershausen's right hip.

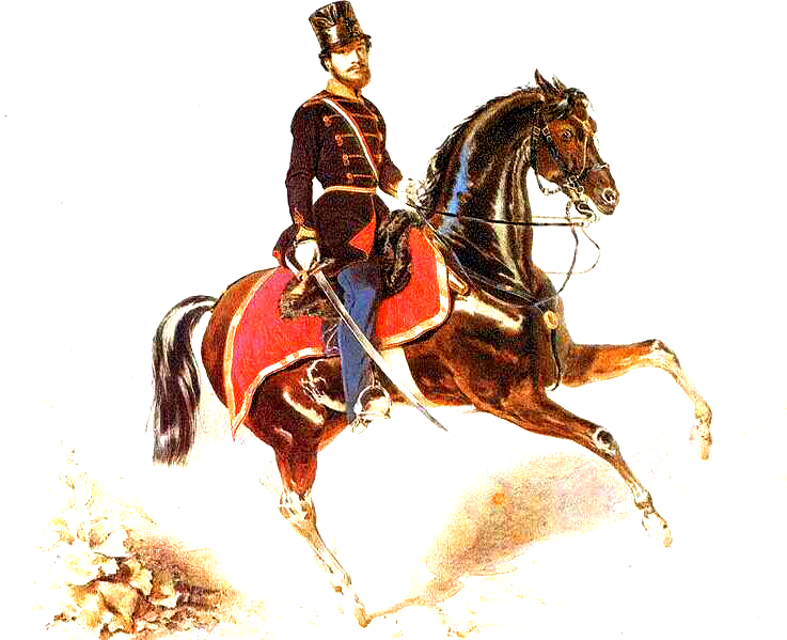
Hussar by Borsos József 1848

Meanwhile, the Hungarian artillery started to fire on the two companies of the 7th (Kress) Light Cavalry Regiment which was advancing along the post road, forcing them to turn back. But Jelačić got in front of them and turned them back. No sooner had this been done than a Croatian militia battalion advancing up the road was routing back while screaming. The cause of this was that the Hungarian artillery fired on them, and the cannonballs tore several of them apart. Behind the battalion made of "professional" soldiers, the untrained militia battalions were supposed to serve as a pressure group, but their indiscipline caused them to advance so much in front of the regular troops, that they were caught in the Hungarian cannon fire. Thus, while the Gradiska battalion had only one killed and two wounded, the Lika battalion lost 11 killed and 25 wounded, and the Otočac battalion lost 4 killed and 7 wounded men. Jelačić tried to give them courage, gave them a speech, drew his sword, and wanted to personally lead them, but he could not stop them. With great difficulty, the officers managed to pull them out of the fire line and set them up as reserves. But again they could not be convinced to attack. Captain Rodić even took the unit's flag in his hand and tried to turn them back to the battlefield, but with no success. Soon all Croatian guns, except the six-pounder battery, were withdrawn because "they were no match for the enemy guns with larger calibers". The Hungarian artillery also drove back the Austrian Cuirassiers sent to attack.

According to the memoirs of Lajos Zámbelly, the Croatian militia assault battalions could be persuaded to advance for the third time, after the second attack had been repulsed, only through the severe coercive intervention of some cavalry units and border guard soldiers. Finally, after the militias were forced to participate in the attack, in the third charge, five battalions pushed straight forward, together with the whole Croatian cavalry, but after a few cannon shots of the Hungarians, they militias panicked, and ran back in disorder. According to Móga, the enemy was forced to retreat by the artillery and the shots of György Lázár's soldiers. The one-and-a-half Hungarian batteries on the left side of the road also participated in repulsing the attack, thus the Croatian columns were caught in a crossfire. No hand-to-hand fighting took place, as the attacking columns did not even reach the Hungarian infantry line. Although most sources write about three attacks, according to the Hungarian staff log, the Croats attacked four times from the vineyards, and even brought forward two guns, but were finally forced to retreat.

The clash had been going on for about two hours, and Jelačić and his entourage still knew nothing about what had happened on the left flank under Kempen or about where was the Hartlieb division. "In this way," Hermann Dahlen wrote in his diary, "we were outmatched by the enemy, our disorganized border guard [units] were almost completely disintegrated, and even the Seressaner did not live up to expectations."

This prompted Jelacic to switch from attack to defence. At about 1 p.m., Jelačić dismounted and sat down, and his escort did the same. At about half past two, a courier arrived from Kempen, saying that he was about the same level with the center and that his troops had been driven back by a bayonet charge. Hearing this, Jelačić's escort lay down on the lawn and waited.

Suddenly they heard gunshots from behind, then bullets were flying around them, one of which even wounded an officer. Jelačić's escort jumped up and rushed to the scene. Some members of one of the militia battalions opened a huge sheepfold nearby and began hunting the outrunning animals. The chaotic episode left several soldiers injured and even one death. The officers were unable to bring order to the militias. The life-threatening sheep hunt, which even endangered the lives of officers, lasted until 6 p.m., as the militias fired shots at random. Jelačić himself was forced to leave Pákozd and seek refuge west of the village. The firing was also heard on the Hungarian side, but they believed that Jelačić had fired into his retreating troops to force them to advance again.

At around 3 pm, the battle was essentially over.

The first battalions of the Hartlieb Division arrived late in the afternoon, between 4 and 5 o'clock, the 1st Battalion of the 3rd (Otočac) Borderguard Regiment being the first to arrive, and the rest of the division itself only after dark. It was only after 6 p.m., after a dangerous sheep hunt ended, that Jelačić and his escort ventured out to inspect the Hungarian positions. However, the alert Hungarian artillerymen spotted him and "greeted him" with cannon shots.

Once the whole of Hartlieb's division had arrived, Jelacic did not think of resuming the battle. It was only the Seressaners in the center who raided the cellars in the vineyards, and after driving off the Hungarian outposts there, they quenched there their thirst by drinking a lot of vines. Jelačić and his entourage spent the evening in a rather depressed mood.

One of the ironic peculiarities of the battle of Pákozd, which made enemies from each other not only the regiments with different sentiments under the same ruler, whom they both continued to recognize as such, but even the parts of the same military units that had fought side by side in good understanding for decades were put now to fight against each other, as happened, for example, with the 5th Artillery Regiment, half of which fought with the Hungarians and the other half with Jelačić.

== Aftermath ==
Altogether, the two parties deployed 46,000 soldiers and 76 guns to the battlefield. Considering these numbers, the number of losses were relatively low. The Hungarian toll was 7 dead, 37 injured, and 5 horses. Lieutenant General Móga estimated Jelačić's losses at 100. However, it appears that the Croats had altogether 49 dead and injured. While Jelačić, for his part, estimated multiple losses for the Hungarians. During the retreat the Hungarians lost some more dead and injured soldiers when the two units shot at one another. The exact number of the fallen is not known but the Hungarian losses possibly matched the Croatian losses.

On the 30th of September Jelačić's message, proposing a three-day cease-fire was delivered to the Hungarian commander-in-chief. The Hungarian side was happy but worried about the battle. In spite of their success, the Hungarian army feared that Josip Jelačić would encircle them and cut them off from Pest-Buda. In the evening, the Hungarian command ordered a general retreat. However, this retreat happened under the most unfortunate circumstances. In the darkness, several units got mixed up and fired at one another. The troops arriving at Martonvásár did not even resemble a triumphant army. Consequently, both the commander-in-chief and the government commissioners accepted Jelačić's offer of a cease-fire. The agreement concluded on September 30 set the battlefield positions occupied on September 29 as the demarcation line beyond which no troop movement was allowed.

The points of this armistice were:
1. The armistice may last 72 hours from the hour of confirmation.
2. The borderline of the Hungarian troops is: Csákvár, Sukoró, Dinnyés, Seregélyes és Szolgaegyháza, and of the Croatian k.u.k. troops is: Csákberény, Zámoly, Puszta-Kála, Pákozd és Sár-Keresztur.
3. No operations may be carried out beyond this line during the armistice and the troops which overcrossed it must withdraw to within cannon shot of it.
4. If during this armistice a conciliation from a higher position would commence, this armistice may be extended as circumstances permit.
5. In the provisioning of troops, all violence shall be avoided as far as possible, and the civil authorities of the country shall be called upon to act.

According to the armistice treaty, the Hungarian army had to retreat immediately, which he did, no doubt to a very favorable position in the vicinity of Martonvásár. It is quite clear from the terms of the treaty that the Hungarian officers were not very good at exploiting the advantages of the victory. Perhaps Móga did not yet have much confidence in the resilience of his army, despite the brilliant first test of fire, and therefore thought it was wiser to rely on a more advantageous terrain in case of a renewed attack.

But Jelačić had no plan to attack, furthermore, he used this time to prepare a retreat. Despite expecting Roth's corps to arrive from the south, he was afraid that the Hungarian troops and the anti-Croatian popular uprising which spread in those territories, will force the latter to retreat, and he also was terrified of the taught that a Hungarian attack against his army left without provisions, will cause a catastrophic defeat unless he left the Székesfehérvár area quickly, abandoning Roth's corps to his fate. Since he could not go towards Pest, nor towards the south, the only alternative route was towards Győr. He intended to incorporate the non-Hungarian imperial-royal units stationed in Transdanubia and Northern Hungary into his army and to restore communication with Vienna. These were the reasons why he decided to leave his earlier battlefield positions and move his army in a northwestern direction. He hoped for a future successful attack with his reinforcements.

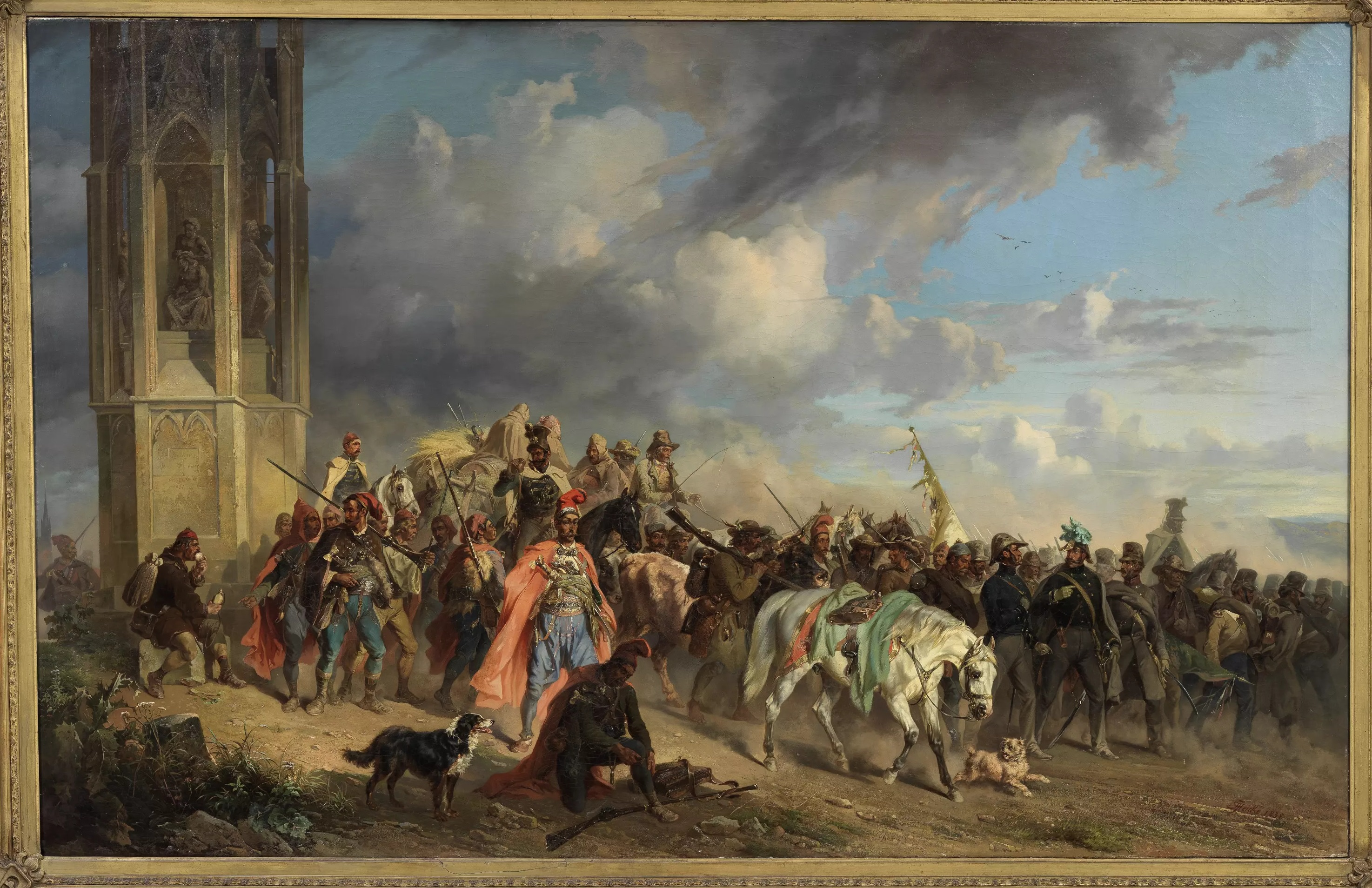
Josef Heicke: The troops of Jelacic arrive to Vienna, after being defeated at Pákozd, and retreated from Hungary

Jelačić began his withdrawal as early as 1 October, violating the armistice treaty's clause forbidding any military operations during the 72 hours of the ceasefire. The Croatian army reached Mór on October 1 and Kisbér on October 2, from where he tried to take Komárom, the most powerful fortress of the country at that time, and finally appealed to the commander of the castle, Lieutenant-Colonel Majthényi, who had replaced the pro-Habsburg Lieutenant-General Mertz, to open the gates of the fortress, otherwise, he would destroy it together with the city. But Majthényi's denied this, so Jelačić continued his retreat to Győr, and on the 5th he arrived at Magyaróvár, then on the 7th of October he crossed the Hungarian-Austrian border, concluding in this way his unsuccessful campaign against Hungary.

Móga heard of Jelačić's retreat from his camp in Martonvásár on 2 October, and as a result, he was late in setting out, according to the orders from Pest, the more mobile part of his army in pursuit of the fleeing enemy, while its rest, consisting mainly of militias, was placed under the command of Mór Perczel and Artúr Görgei and sent against the Croatian Ban's reserve column under the command of General Roth, which was approaching Székesfehérvár.

In conclusion, about the result of this battle can be said that the Hungarian army wanted to stop the Croatian advance and this goal was essentially achieved. This fact was not altered by the Hungarian retreat to Martonvásár since the Croat army deferred from another attack when the cease-fire was concluded. Jelačić's goals had been to defeat the Hungarian army and occupy the capital. After Pákozd, Jelačić had to abandon this goal and acknowledge his failure by seeking a cease-fire. Considering the small number of casualties on both sides, and the fact that the Croatian army retained its striking capability, it can be said that the Hungarians achieved more of a moral victory than a military one. Just as the self-confidence, courage and moral strength of the Hungarian army, which had stood so brilliantly the first trial by fire, had been increased by their success against the 2,5 times bigger enemy, so the defeat suffered had a crushing, shattering, and disintegrating effect on the overconfident Croatian army, which had initially looked down arrogantly upon the Hungarian army.

Among the officers, Major General Franz Holtsche, Colonel Ernő Kiss, Major Ignaz Anaker, and artillery lieutenant József Makk (Mack) were noted for their performances. In addition to all of these, the House of Representatives voted 500 gold pieces, and patriotic gratitude to the army, its commander, and to the chief of staff Major Josef Kollmann, who made the battle plan.

In Hungary its anniversary (29 September) later became "National Defence Day" (Hungarian: "a honvédség napja"). In 1991 that day was changed to 21 May (the date of the recapture of Buda at the Battle of Buda (1849)).

== Sources ==
- Bánlaky, József (2001). A magyar nemzet hadtörténelme (The Military History of the Hungarian Nation) (in Hungarian). Budapest: Arcanum Adatbázis.
- Bóna, Gábor, ed. (1999). The Hungarian Revolution and War of Independence. A Military History. War and Society in East Central Europe. Vol. XXXV. Translated by Arató, Nóra. Atlantic Research and Publications, Inc. ISBN 0-88033-433-9.
- Erdős, Ferenc (1998), Forradalom és szabadságharc Fejér megyében 1848-1849 ("Revolution and War of Independence in the Fejér County") (in Hungarian), Székesfehérvár: Fejér Megyei Levéltár közleményei 23., ISBN 963-7233-22-9
- Nemeskürty, István (1998), 1848––49 – Kik érted haltak szent világszabadság ..("1848–49 – Who lived and died for the independence") (in Hungarian), Aquila könyvek, ISBN 963-434-332-5
- Tóth, Sándor; Liptai, Ervin (1985), Magyarország hadtörténete két kötetben ("Military History of Hungary in two volumes") (in Hungarian), Zrínyi Katonai Kiadó, ISBN 963-326-332-8
- Hermann, Róbert (2010), "A pákozdi csata. 1848 szeptember 29" (PDF), Hadtörténelmi Közlemények 2014 (volume 127, nr. 2) (in Hungarian)
- Hermann, Róbert (May 1995), A szabadságharc hadserege (""Army of the revolution") (in Hungarian), Rubicon
- Hermann, Róbert (2004). Az 1848–1849-es szabadságharc nagy csatái ("Great battles of the Hungarian War of Independence of 1848–1849") (in Hungarian). Budapest: Zrínyi. p. 408. ISBN 963-327-367-6.
- Hermann, Róbert (2013). Nagy csaták. 15. A magyar önvédelmi háború ("Great Battles. 15. The Hungarian War od Self Defense") (in Hungarian). Budapest: Duna Könyvklub. p. 88. ISBN 978-615-5013-99-7.
- Nobili, Johann. Hungary 1848: The Winter Campaign. Edited and translated Christopher Pringle. Warwick, UK: Helion & Company Ltd., 2021.
- Földi, Pál, Ezer év csatái – Kis magyar hadtörténelem (""A thousand years of war – A Shorter Hungarian Military History") (in Hungarian), ISBN 963-9189-01-4
