= Borsod-Abaúj-Zemplén County 7th constituency =

Hungarian electoral district

Borsod-Abaúj-Zemplén County 7th constituency (Mezőkövesd)
- Constituency for the National Assembly
- Location of Borsod-Abaúj-Zemplén county 07 within Borsod-Abaúj-Zemplén county

- Location of Borsod-Abaúj-Zemplén county within Hungary
- County: Borsod-Abaúj-Zemplén
- Electorate: 75,515 (2022)
- Major settlements: Mezőkövesd

Current constituency
- Created: 2011
- Party: Tisza Party
- Member: Erzsébet Csézi
- Elected: 2026

The 7th constituency of Borsod-Abaúj-Zemplén County (Hungarian: Borsod-Abaúj-Zemplén megyei 07. számú országgyűlési egyéni választókerület) is one of the single member constituencies of the National Assembly, the national legislature of Hungary. The constituency standard abbreviation: Borsod-Abaúj-Zemplén 07. OEVK.

Since 2026, it has been represented by Erzsébet Csézi of the Tisza Party.

== Geography ==
The 7th constituency is located in southern part of Borsod-Abaúj-Zemplén County.

=== List of municipalities ===
The constituency includes the following municipalities:

1. Ároktő
2. Berzék
3. Bogács
4. Borsodgeszt
5. Borsodivánka
6. Bükkábrány
7. Bükkaranyos
8. Bükkszentkereszt
9. Bükkzsérc
10. Cserépfalu
11. Cserépváralja
12. Csincse
13. Egerlövő
14. Emőd
15. Gelej
16. Harsány
17. Hejőbába
18. Hejőkeresztúr
19. Hejőkürt
20. Hejőpapi
21. Hejőszalonta
22. Igrici
23. Kács
24. Kisgyőr
25. Kistokaj
26. Köröm
27. Mályi
28. Mezőcsát
29. Mezőkeresztes
30. Mezőkövesd
31. Mezőnagymihály
32. Mezőnyárád
33. Muhi
34. Nagycsécs
35. Négyes
36. Nemesbikk
37. Nyékládháza
38. Ónod
39. Répáshuta
40. Sajóhídvég
41. Sajólád
42. Sajópetri
43. Sály
44. Szakáld
45. Szentistván
46. Szomolya
47. Tard
48. Tibolddaróc
49. Tiszabábolna
50. Tiszadorogma
51. Tiszakeszi
52. Tiszatarján
53. Tiszavalk
54. Vatta

== Members ==
The constituency was first represented by András Tállai of the Fidesz from 2014, and he was re-elected in 2018 and 2022. In the 2026 election, Erzsébet Csézi of the Tisza Party was elected representative.

Election	Member	Party	%	Ref.
2014	András Tállai	Fidesz	47.20	
2018	András Tállai	Fidesz	54.79	
2022	András Tállai	Fidesz	60.42	
2026	Erzsébet Csézi	Tisza Party	53.04	
