= Mezőkövesd Subregion =

Coordinates: 47°52′N 20°38′E

Mezőkövesd Subregion, Borsod-Abaúj-Zemplén, is the fifth largest of the subregions of Hungary. Area: 679,66 km^{2}. Population: 43,664 (2009).

Settlements:

- Bogács
- Borsodgeszt
- Borsodivánka
- Bükkábrány
- Bükkzsérc
- Cserépfalu
- Cserépváralja
- Csincse
- Egerlövő
- Kács
- Mezőkeresztes
- Mezőkövesd
- Mezőnagymihály
- Mezőnyárád
- Négyes
- Sály
- Szentistván
- Szomolya
- Tard
- Tibolddaróc
- Vatta

== See also ==
- Mezőkövesd District (from 2013)
