= Mezőkövesd District =

Mezőkövesd District Mezőkövesdi járás
- Districts of Hungary
- Coat of arms

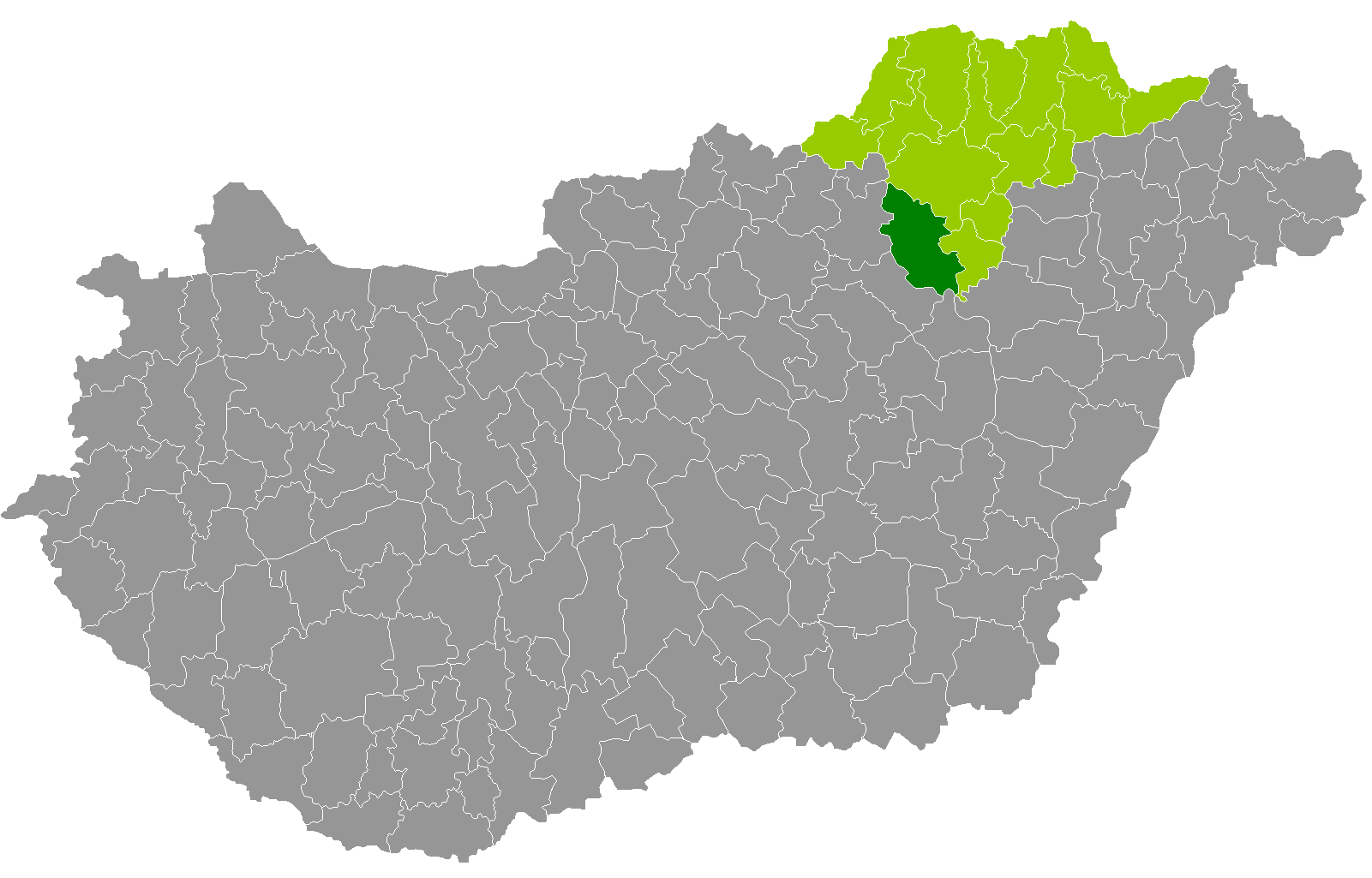
- Mezőkövesd District within Hungary and Borsod-Abaúj-Zemplén County.
- Coordinates: 47.81°N 20.57°E
- Country: Hungary
- County: Borsod-Abaúj-Zemplén
- District seat: Mezőkövesd

Area
  - Total: 723.87 km^{2} (279.49 sq mi)
  - Rank: 2nd in Borsod-Abaúj-Zemplén

Population (2011 census)
  - Total: 42,434
  - Rank: 4th in Borsod-Abaúj-Zemplén
  - Density: 59/km^{2} (150/sq mi)

Mezőkövesd (Hungarian: Mezőkövesdi járás) is a district in south-western part of Borsod-Abaúj-Zemplén County. Mezőkövesd is also the name of the town where the district seat is found. The district is located in the Northern Hungary Statistical Region.

== Geography ==
Mezőkövesd District borders with Miskolc District to the northeast, Mezőcsát District to the east, Tiszafüred District (Jász-Nagykun-Szolnok County) to the south, Füzesabony District and Eger District (Heves County) to the west. The number of the inhabited places in Mezőkövesd District is 23.

== Municipalities ==
The district has 2 towns, 1 large village and 20 villages. (ordered by population, as of 1 January 2012)

- Bogács (2,024)
- Borsodgeszt (246)
- Borsodivánka (739)
- Bükkábrány (1,558)
- Bükkzsérc (950)
- Cserépfalu (1,002)
- Cserépváralja (427)
- Csincse (562)
- Egerlövő (534)
- Kács (509)
- **Mezőkeresztes** (3,803)
- **Mezőkövesd** (16,538) – district seat
- Mezőnagymihály (1,032)
- Mezőnyárád (1,532)
- Négyes (236)
- Sály (2,085)
- Szentistván (2,343)
- Szomolya (1,559)
- Tard (1,230)
- Tibolddaróc (1,417)
- Tiszabábolna (370)
- Tiszavalk (307)
- Vatta (864)

The bolded municipalities are cities, italics municipality is large village.

== Demographics ==
Religion in Mezőkövesd District (2011 census)
1. Catholic Church (52.6%)
2. Greek Catholicism (0.50%)
3. Calvinism (14.5%)
4. Lutheranism (0.10%)
5. Other religions (1.30%)
6. Non-religious (7.70%)
7. Atheists (0.50%)
8. Undeclared (22.8%)

In 2011, it had a population of 42,432 and the population density was 59/km^{2}.

Year	County population	Change
2011	42,432	n/a

=== Ethnicity ===
Besides the Hungarian majority, the main minorities are the Roma (approx. 2,500) and German (200).

Total population (2011 census): 42,432
Ethnic groups (2011 census): Identified themselves: 40,091 persons:

- Hungarians: 37,326 (93.10%)
- Gypsies: 2,202 (5.49%)
- Others and indefinable: 563 (1.40%)

Approx. 2,500 persons in Mezőkövesd District did not declare their ethnic group at the 2011 census.

=== Religion ===
Religious adherence in the county according to 2011 census:

- Catholic – 22,530 (Roman Catholic – 22,312; Greek Catholic – 212);
- Reformed – 6,163;
- Evangelical – 55;
- other religions – 522;
- Non-religious – 3,274;
- Atheism – 228;
- Undeclared – 9,662.

== Gallery ==
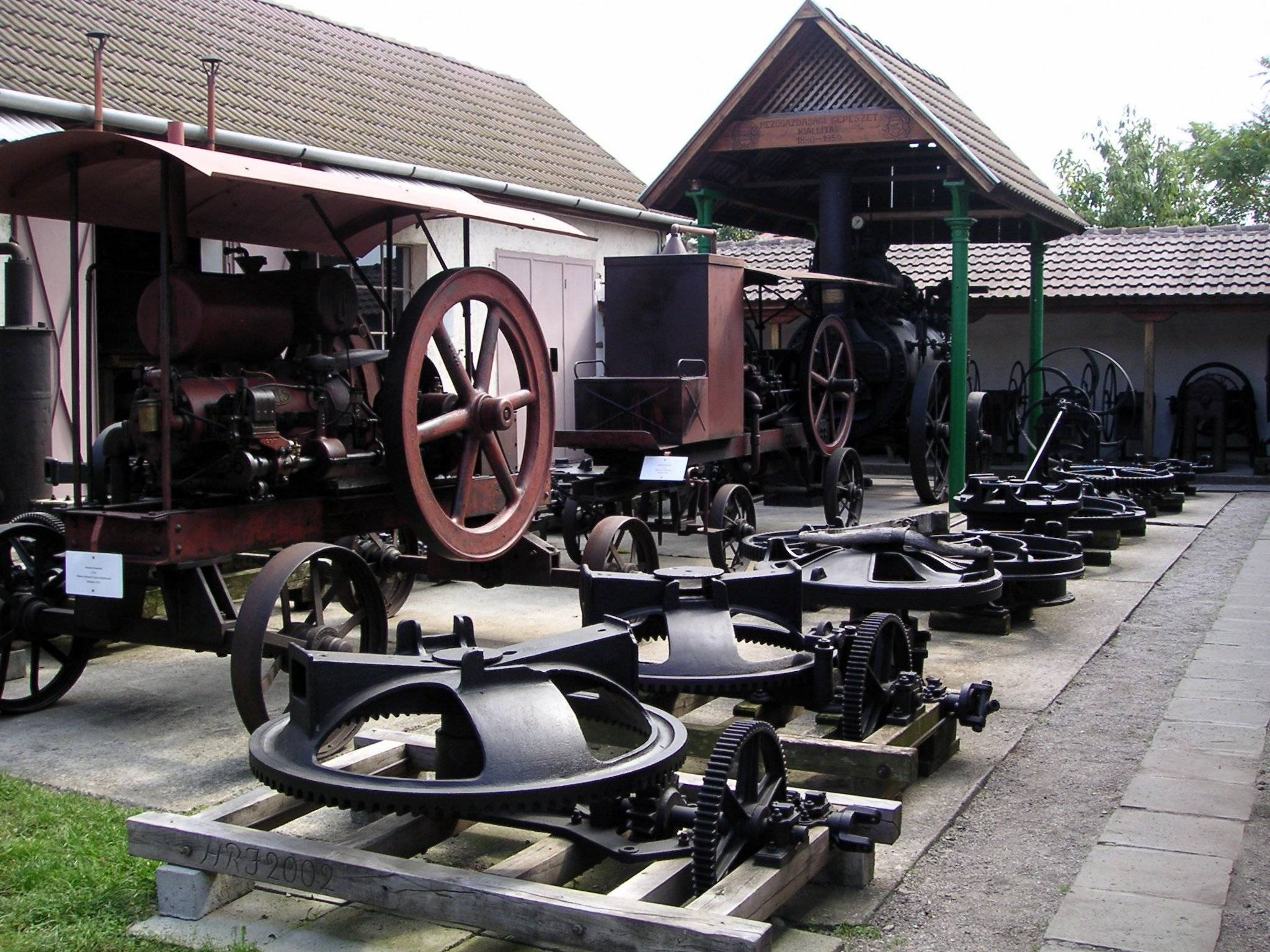
Agriculture Museum in Mezőkövesd

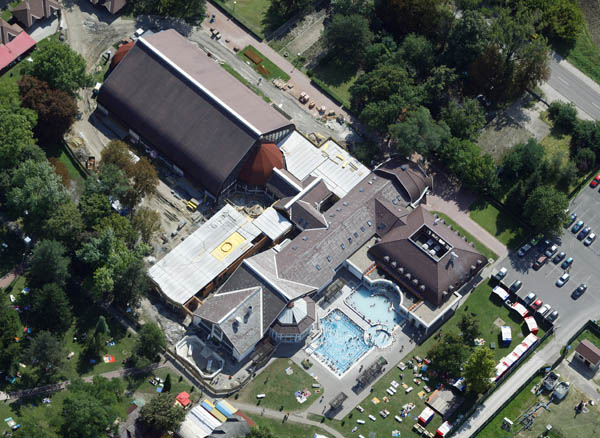
Zsóry Baths in Mezőkövesd

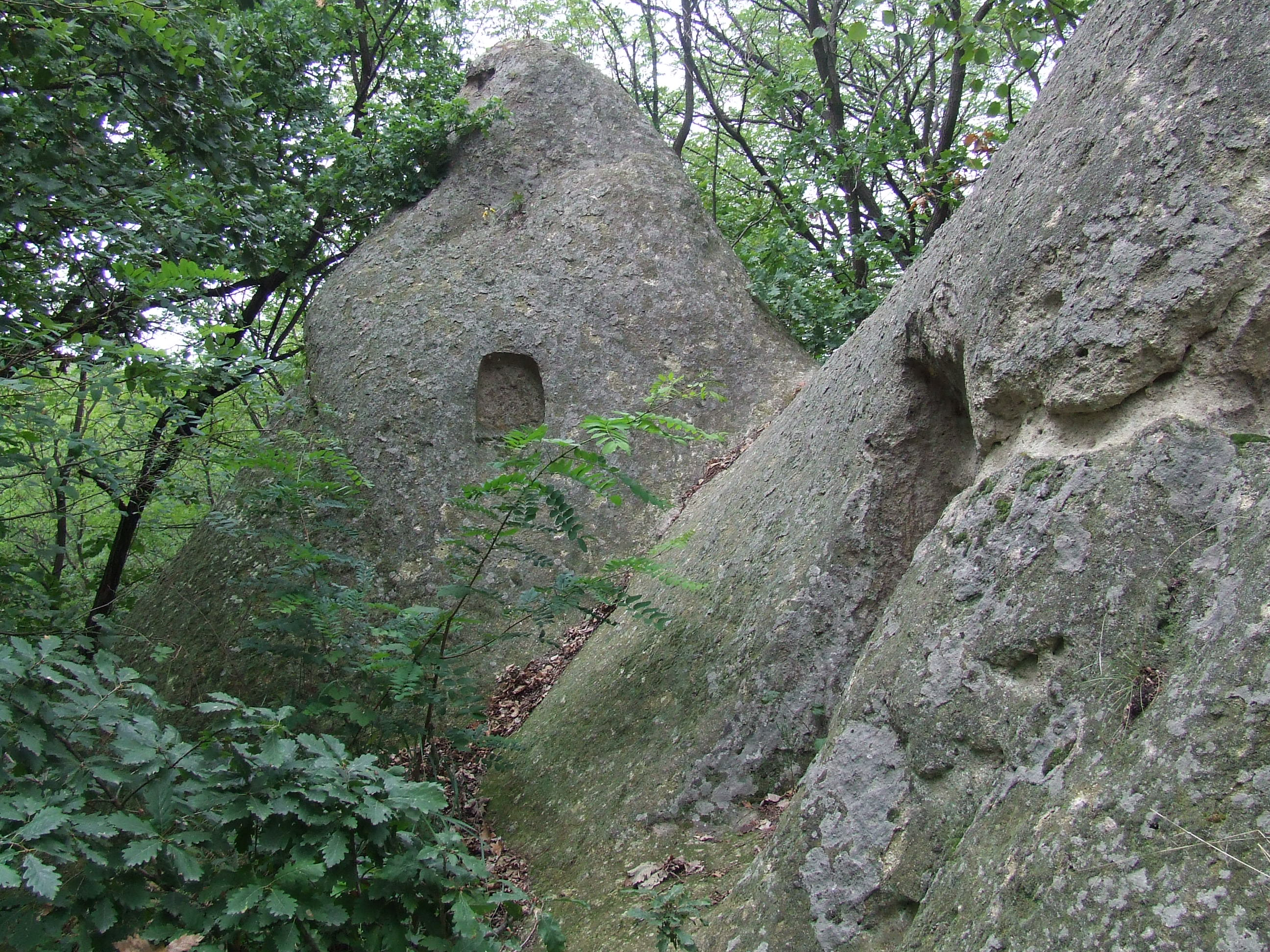
Beehive stone in Tibolddaróc

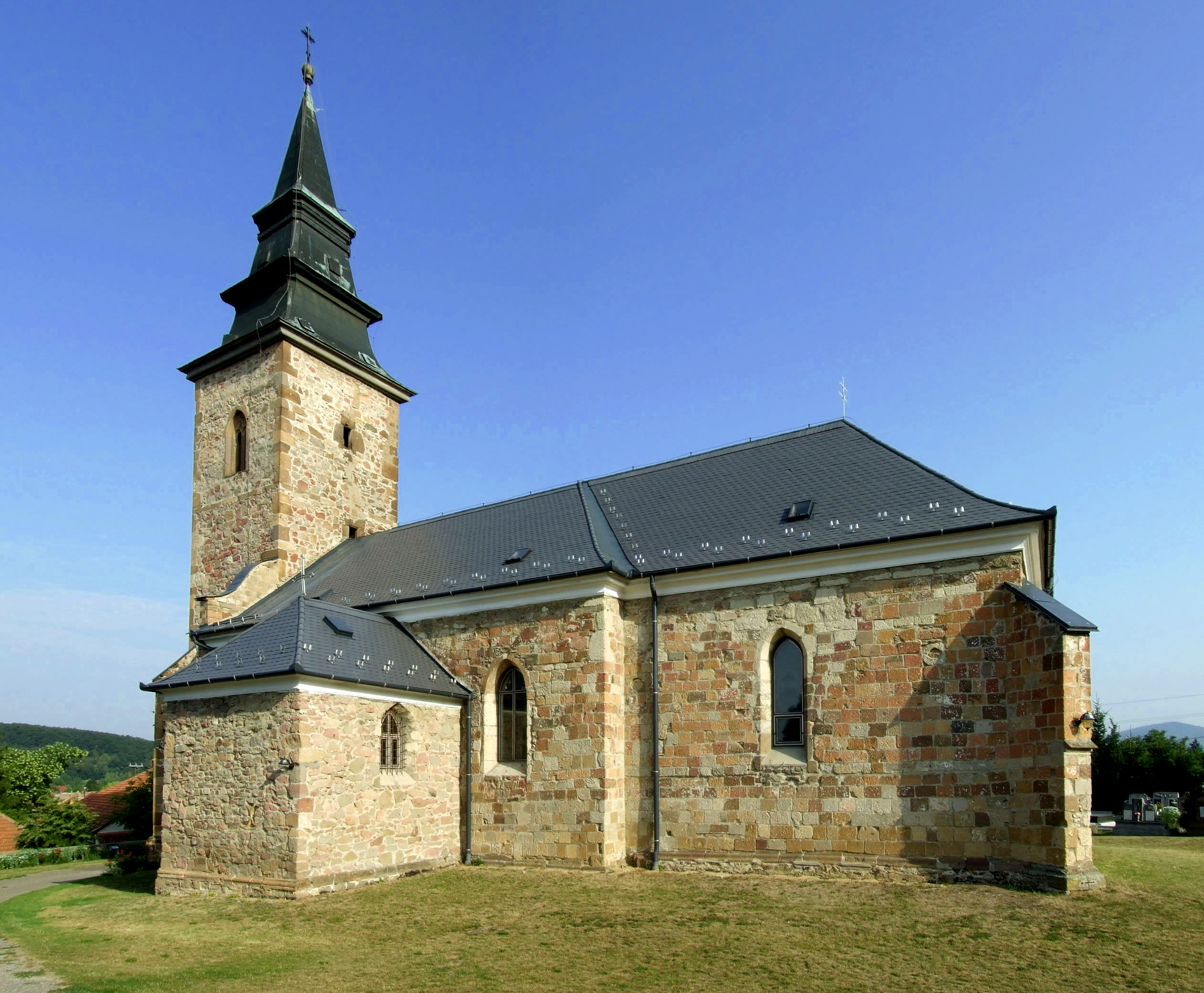
St. Martin Church in Bogács

== See also ==
- List of cities and towns of Hungary
- Mezőkövesd Subregion (until 2013)
