= Mezőkeresztes =

- Town
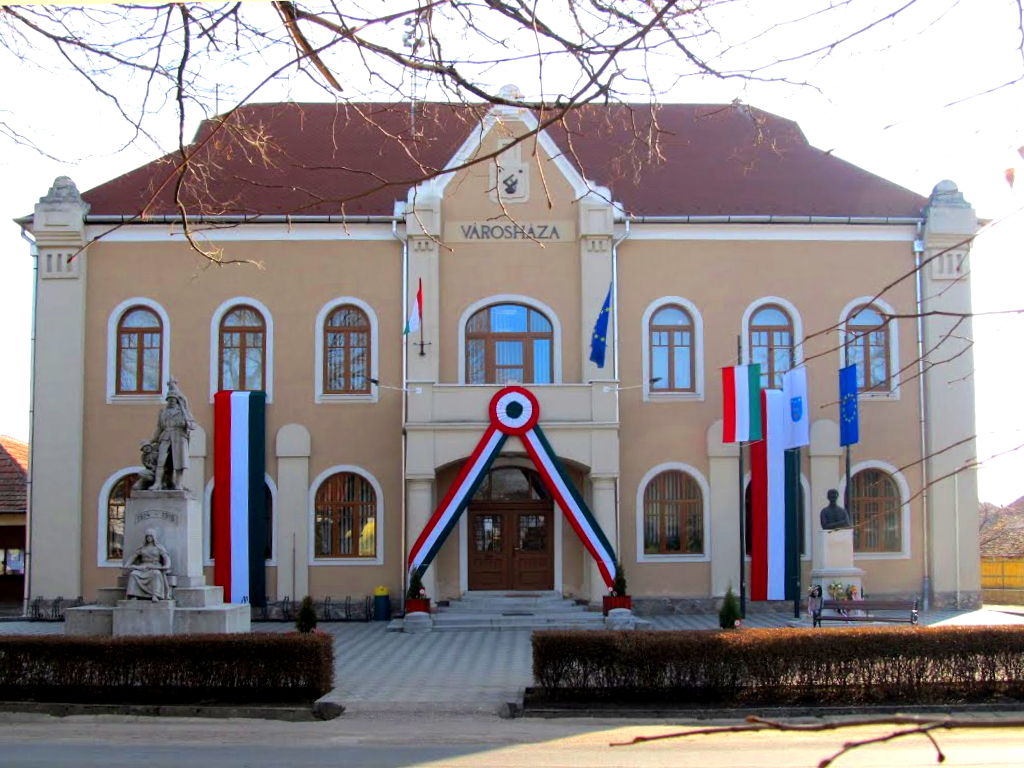
- Town hall

- Flag Coat of arms

- Location of Borsod-Abaúj-Zemplén county in Hungary

- Location of Mezőkeresztes
- Coordinates: 47.82537°N 20.68808°E
- Country: Hungary
- County: Borsod-Abaúj-Zemplén
- District: Mezőkövesd

Area
  - Total: 74.26 km^{2} (28.67 sq mi)

Population (2015)
  - Total: 3,818
  - Density: 51.41/km^{2} (133.2/sq mi)
- Time zone: UTC+1 (CET)
  - Summer (DST): UTC+2 (CEST)
- Postal code: 3441
- Area code: (+36) 49
- Website: mezokeresztes.hu

Mezőkeresztes is a town in Borsod-Abaúj-Zemplén county, in northern Hungary, near Mezőkövesd and Eger.

== Location ==
35 km (22 mi) south from county seat Miskolc. Can be reached by car on highway M3. The train station Mezőkeresztes–Mezőnyárád is 3.1 km (2 mi) away from the town itself, towards Mezőnyárád.

== History ==
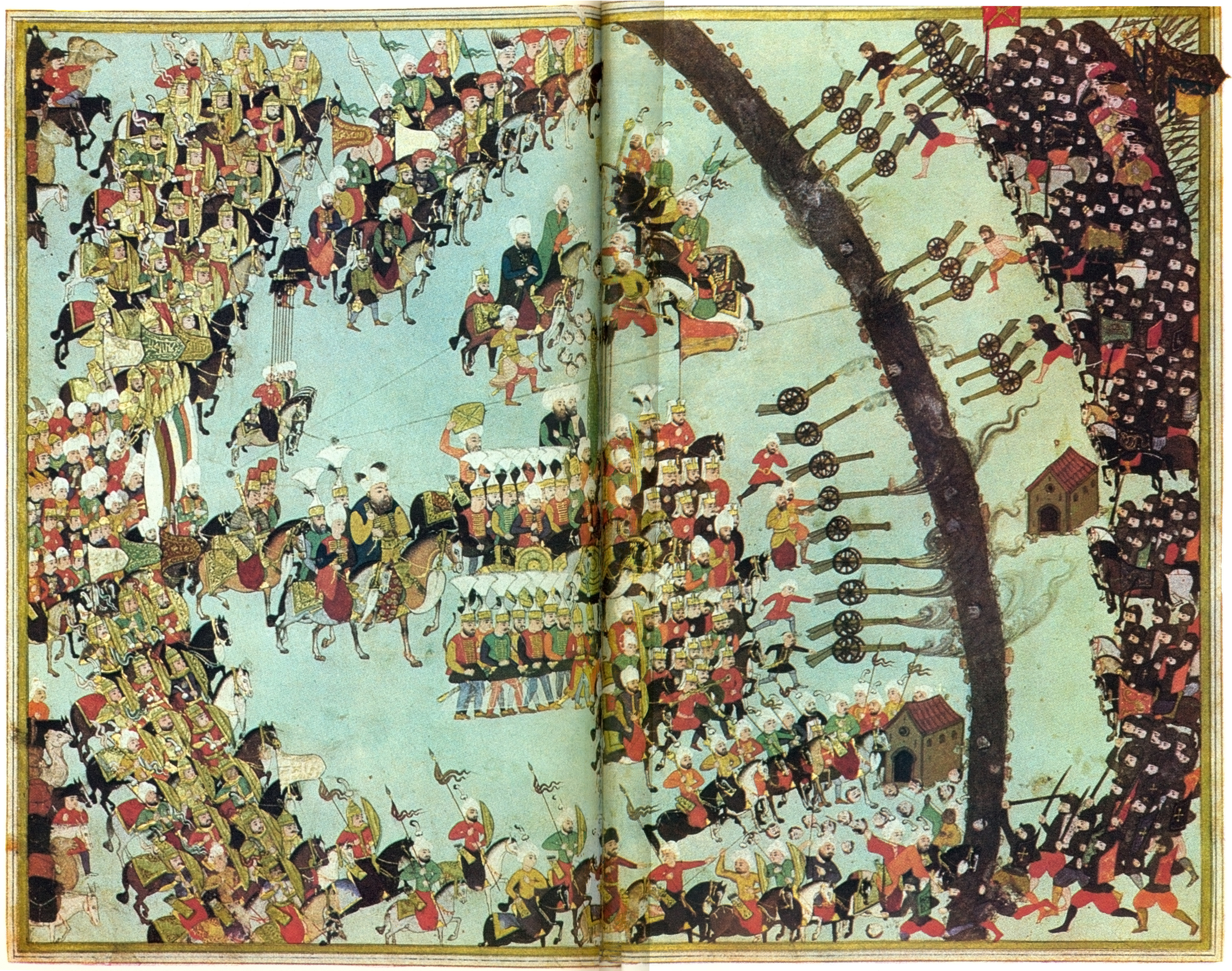
Battle of Mezőkeresztes

The area around it has been inhabited since the Great Migration. In the 14th century it belonged to the Diósgyőr estate. King Ladislaus V granted market town status to Mezőkeresztes.

In 1596, there was a great Battle of Mezőkeresztes, where Mehmed III, a sultan of the Ottoman Empire defeated the Habsburg and Transylvanian forces. During the battle the Sultan had to be dissuaded from fleeing the field halfway through the battle.

After the end of the Ottoman era, the town prospered but in the 19th century it lost its importance and became a village.

In 1950, oil resources were found nearby; they were exploited by the 1980s.

Mezőkeresztes was granted town status on 1 July 2009.

== Nearby villages ==
Mezőnagymihály (cca. 4 km), Mezőnyárád (4 km), Szentistván (cca. 8 km)

Nearest town: Mezőkövesd (12 km).
