= Bertalan Szemere =

Hungarian poet and nationalist who became the third Prime Minister of Hungary

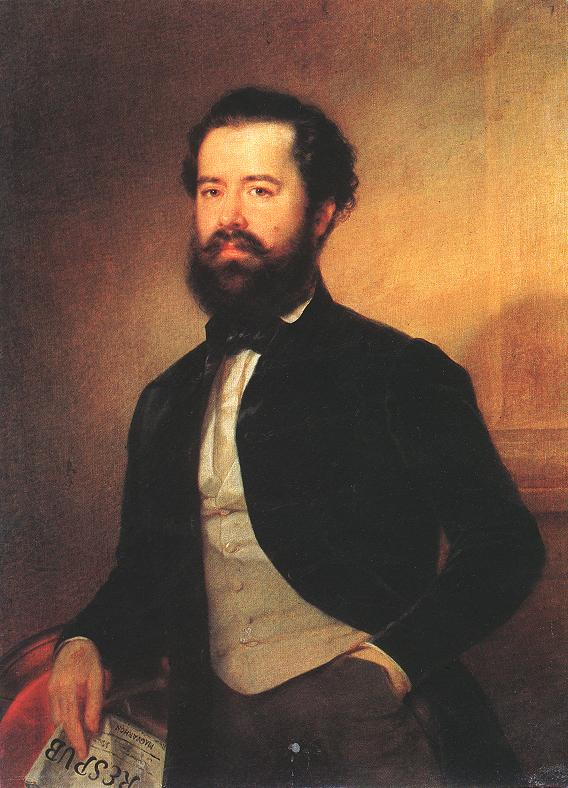

3rd Prime Minister of the Kingdom of Hungary
- In office 2 May 1849 – 11 August 1849
- Preceded by: Lajos Kossuth
- Succeeded by: Austrian occupation Gyula Andrássy (1867)

Personal details
- Born: 27 August 1812 Vatta, Kingdom of Hungary
- Died: 18 January 1869 (aged 56) Pest, Kingdom of Hungary
- Resting place: Miskolc (since 1871)
- Party: Opposition Party
- Spouse: Leopoldina Jurkovich
- Children: Mária; Gizella; Attila
- Profession: politician, jurist

Bertalan Szemere (also referred to as Bartholomew Szemere, 27 August 1812 – 18 January 1869) was a Hungarian poet and nationalist who became the third Prime Minister of Hungary during the short period of the Hungarian Revolution of 1848 when Hungary was independent of rule by the Austrian Empire.

== Early years ==
Szemere was born in Vatta into a poor noble family, which traditionally descended from the lineage of 9th-century chieftain Huba. His father was Major László Szemere, his mother was Erzsébet Karove. Szemere studied in Miskolc, Késmárk and Sárospatak. He was interested in writing poems and his works were published in the periodical Felső-Magyarországi Minerva ("Upper-Hungarian Minerva"). He was influenced by Ferenc Kölcsey and Mihály Vörösmarty.

== In the reform era ==
In 1832 Szemere graduated as a jurist and started to work as an apprentice in Pressburg (now Bratislava, Slovakia) and became a member of the Parliamentary Young Members' Group and advocated liberal principles. After he finished his pupillage, Szemere went back to Borsod where he was elected as an honorary notary public.

In 1835 Szemere travelled around the world and visited amongst other places Berlin, Amsterdam, Dublin, Lausanne, Paris and London. During his visit Szemere realised that Hungary was less developed than he thought. Szemere also saw other countries' prejudice about Hungary. Szemere wrote down his experience, and how foreign institutions developed and worked. He published his diary, Utazás külföldön ("Travelling abroad") in 1840. Even though Szemere finished it in 1839, he couldn't publish it then because of censorship. Szemere's diary made him famous and he became a member of the Hungarian Academy of Sciences. His work was republished.

Between 1841 – 1847 Szemere was a judge in Borsod county. Szemere became a congressman with László Palóczy in Pressburg. Szemere was one of the most important leaders of the Opposition 1843 – 1866 and 1847 – 1848 Diet. In the 1847 – 1848 Diet Szemere also became the recorder.

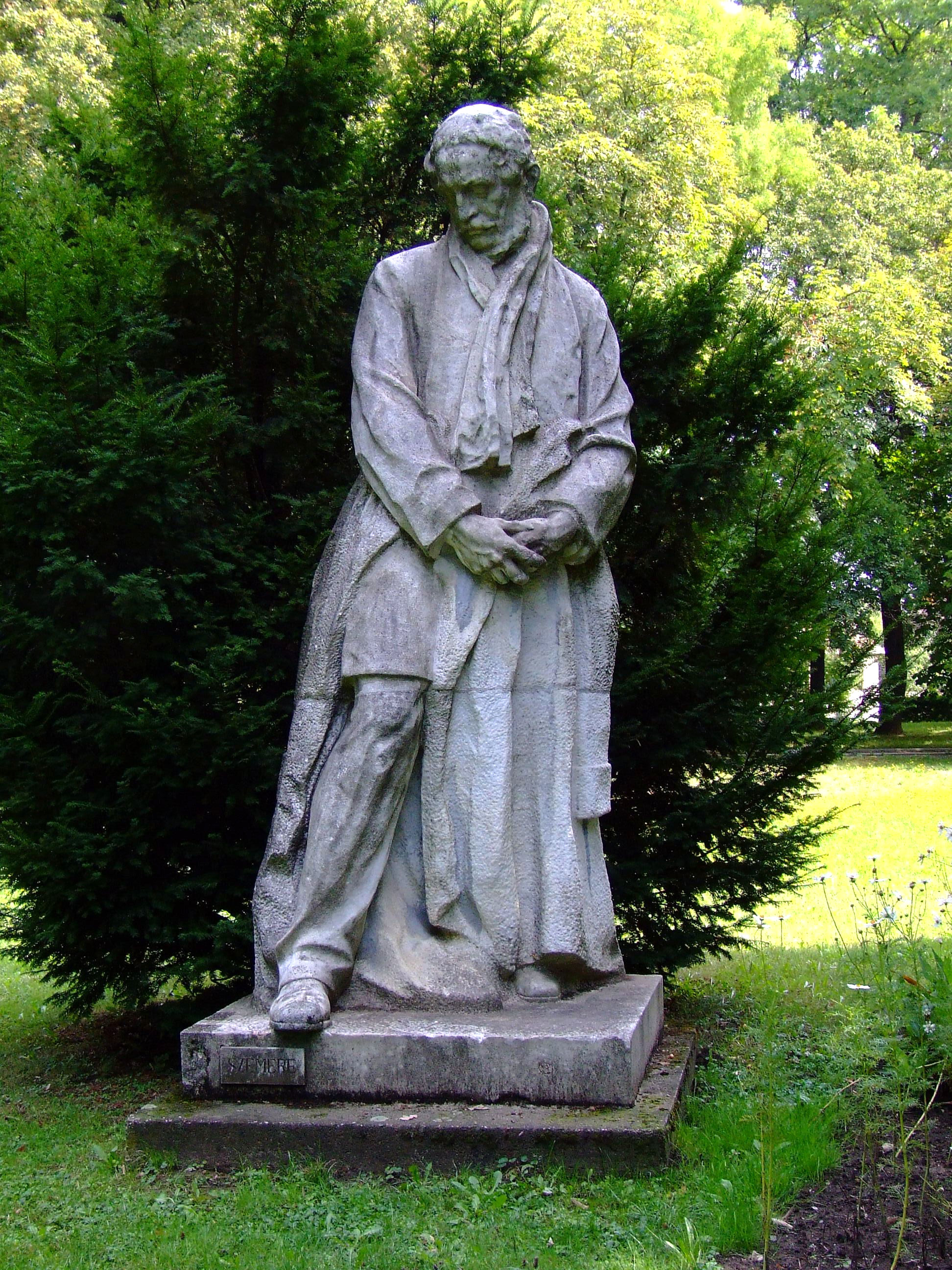
Monument of Bertalan Szemere in Dombóvár

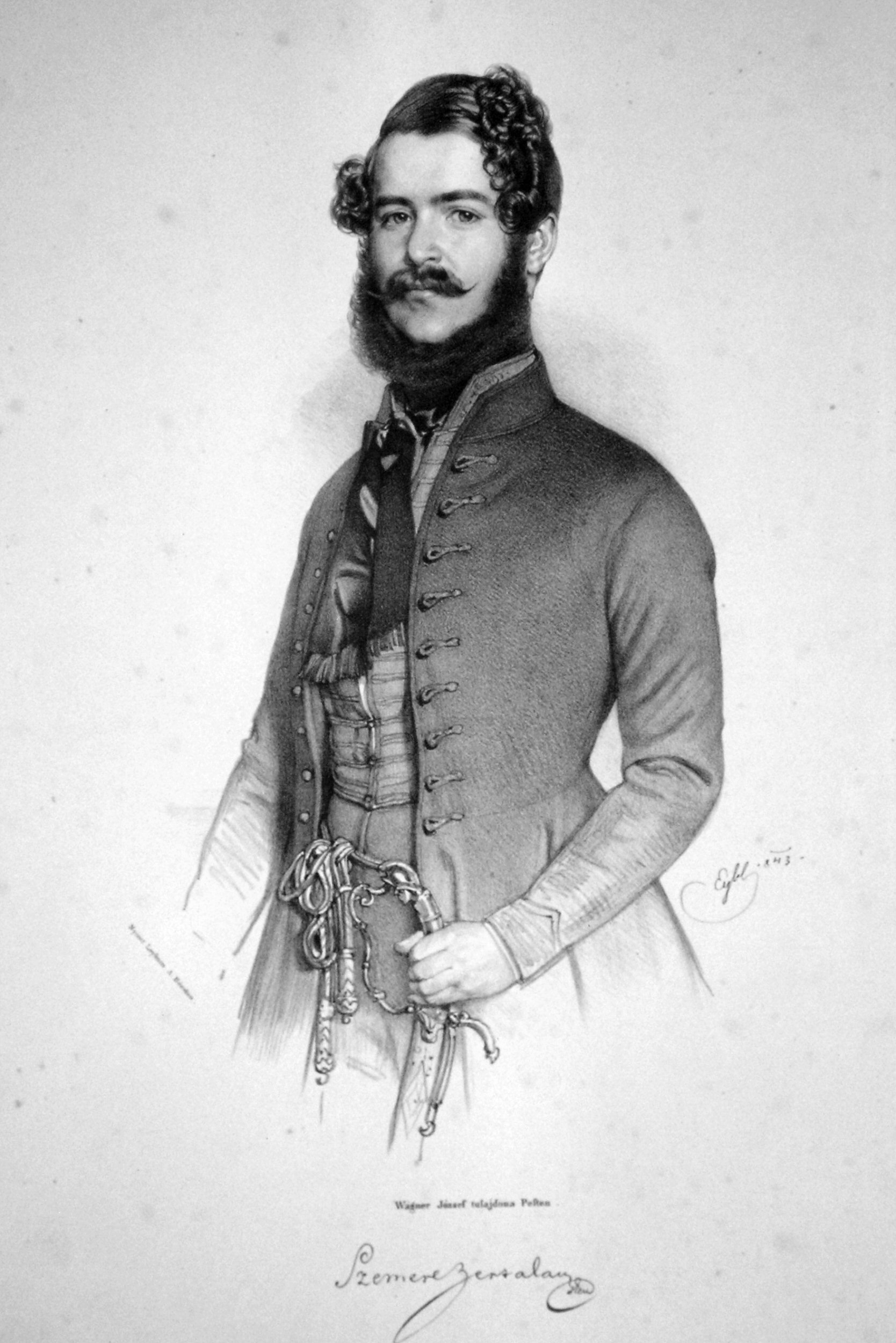
Bertalan Szemere

== Minister and Prime Minister ==
In 1848 Szemere was the Home Secretary of the Batthyány Government. Szemere's task was to set up the new parliament. He started the government's official newspaper, the Közlöny ("Bulletin"). In the Hungarian Military Association he was responsible for justice. From 1848 Szemere was responsible for Upper-Hungary as a politician, therefore he was at Miskolc to reorganize the Upper-Tisza Legion, which had retreated after Franz Schlik's attack. From 2 May 1849 Szemere was Home Secretary and Prime Minister alongside Regent Lajos Kossuth, until his resignation.

The Government ended martial law and worked on the emancipation from serfdom. On 29 July 1849 they accepted the national act which provided free language use for ethnic groups in local administration and education. The government's aim was to win the support of the ethnic groups for the Hungarian Revolution of 1848.

== Emigration ==
After the Hungarian surrender at Világos Szemere buried the Holy Crown of Hungary, the Sceptre, the orb and other regalia on 23 August 1849 at Orsova. He escaped to Turkey, and later emigrated to Paris. In 1851 the Austrian Empire sentenced him to death in absentia.

Szemere supported the Austro-Hungarian Compromise of 1867 and because of this his relationship with Kossuth became worse. Szemere attacked the Hungarian Revolution's leaders in his pamphlet (Magyar Emigráció ("Hungarian Emigration" )) and in another work (Politikai jellemrajzok ("Political Word-picture")). Szemere attacked Kossuth too. During his emigration Szemere wrote a travelogue Utazás keleten ("Journeys in the East").

In 1865 Szemere successfully requested a pardon, but he was mentally ill by that time. In 1869 Szemere died and his ashes were interred in Buda, but on 1 May 1871 they were disinterred and moved to a church in the Avas district of Miskolc.

== Works ==
- Hungary from 1848 to 1860 (London, 1860)

== Sources ==
- Pálinkás, Mihály, Múltunk nagyjai [Great historical figures] (in Hungarian)
- Bölöny, József, Magyarország kormányai 1848–1975 [Hungarian Governments between 1848 – 1975] (in Hungarian)

Political offices
Preceded by post created	Minister of the Interior; 1848	Succeeded by OHB
Preceded by OHB	Minister of the Interior; 1849	Succeeded by Béla Wenckheim
Preceded by Lajos Batthyány	Prime Minister of Hungary; 1849	Succeeded by Gyula Andrássy
