= Szentistván =

- Large village
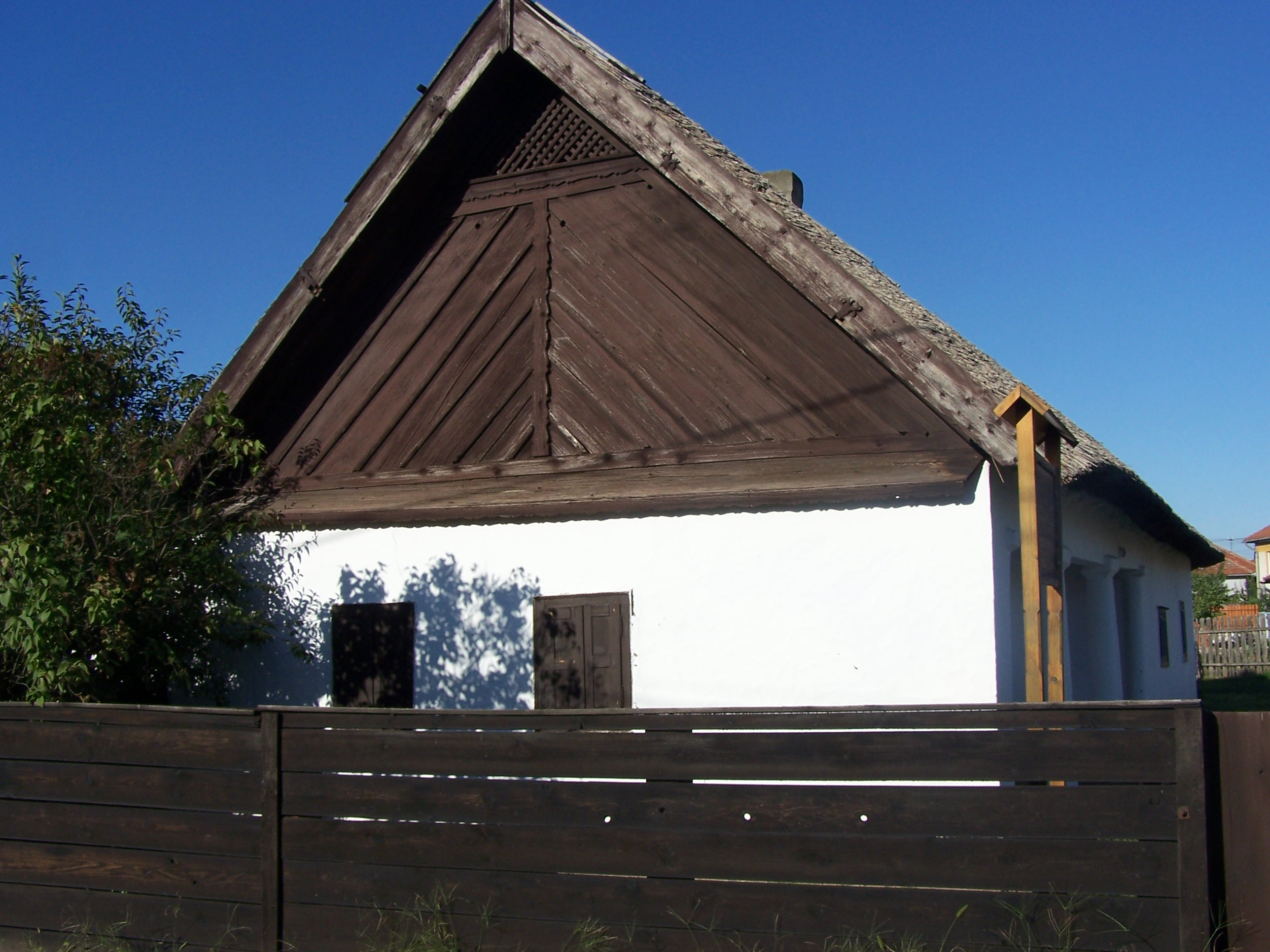

- Flag Coat of arms

- Location of Szentistván
- Coordinates: 47.77296°N 20.65750°E
- Country: Hungary
- Region: Northern Hungary
- County: Borsod-Abaúj-Zemplén
- District: Mezőkövesd

Area
  - Total: 51.12 km^{2} (19.74 sq mi)

Population (1 January 2026)
  - Total: 2,391
  - Density: 46.77/km^{2} (121.1/sq mi)
- Time zone: UTC+1 (CET)
  - Summer (DST): UTC+2 (CEST)
- Postal code: 3418
- Area code: (+36) 49
- Website: www.szentistvan.hu

Szentistván is a village in Northern Hungary, in the Mezőkövesd district of Borsod-Abaúj-Zemplén county.

== Name ==
The village was named after the first king of Hungary, St. Stephen (Szent István in Hungarian).

== Location ==
Szentistván is in the northern part of the Great Hungarian Plain, south from Highway M3. It is a rural area with little industry in the village. Most of its inhabitants work in the nearest town, Mezőkövesd.

== History ==
Human presence in the area can be dated back to the years 3-4000 BCE. The first written record about the village is from 1315, when a church named after King Stephen I was built there; the village itself was first mentioned by this name in 1396. During the Ottoman occupation of Hungary the village was destroyed several times, in 1641 it was mentioned as a deserted place. It was only after the revolution led by Francis II Rákóczi (early 18th century) that the village began to prosper. Until 1945 it was church property, belonging to the Archdiocese of Eger.

== Culture ==
Szentistván is one of the three "Matyó" settlements (Mezőkövesd, Szentistván, Tard). The matyó embroidery is one of the finest examples of Hungarian folk art, it has been inscribed on the Representative List of the Intangible Cultural Heritage of Humanity of the UNESCO in 2012.

The center of Matyóland is Mezőkövesd. The Matyó got their name after King Matthias, a Hungarian king in the 15th century, who gave certain rights to the town of Mezőkövesd. The Matyó people are famous for the traditional, very colorful embroidery which was developed by a local drawing artist, Bori Kisjankó.

Szentistván is known for its folk art because traditions have been kept alive by its inhabitants. Elder women in the village still make embroideries on a regular basis, in some cases for their living.

Another custom of the women is the making of huge cakes and tarts from sugar. These cakes are sold to the people of the neighbouring towns and villages and are served on marriage parties by the newlyweds after they have broken it into small pieces by a small hammer.

A further interesting habit of most of the elder locals is that while they have relatively large houses, they live in a smaller apartment, usually just a kitchen with 2 beds, which is separated from the 'large house' and is in the opposite edge of their garden.

The population of Szentistván is on the decrease, unfortunately, because some of its young inhabitants move into larger towns. Steps must be taken to keep the village's traditions alive.

== Sights to see ==
- St. Stephen Church
- St. Stephen Spring (artesian spring)
- Village museum (in an old house built in the 1890s)
