= Funktasztikus =

Hungarian rapper

Csató Adorján
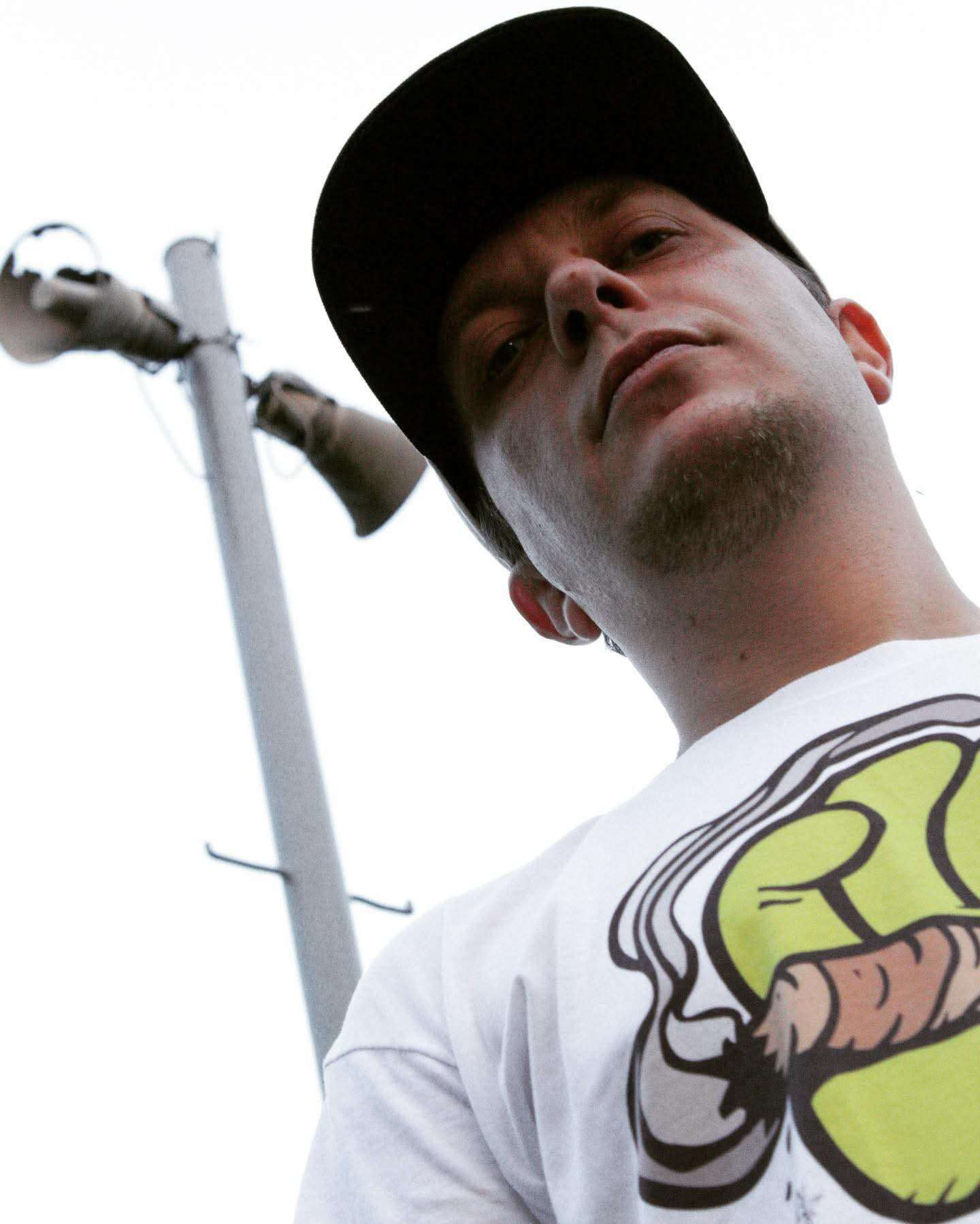

Background information
- Also known as: Funktasztikus, Funk, Szuperszónikus MC, Interfunk, Funk N' Stein
- Born: March 21, 1979 (age 47); Mezőkövesd, Hungary
- Genres: Hip hop
- Occupation: Rapper
- Instrument: vocals
- Years active: 1992–present
- Website: http://funktasztikus.tk/

Csató Adorján, mainly known by his main alias Funktasztikus, is a Hungarian MC and rapper. His birthplace was Mezőkövesd, but his birth date is unknown. He was member of the band Kamikaze. He describes his style of rapping as fast-paced and is compared to Twista and Busta Rhymes.

== Discography ==
- 1997 - Csak szavak
- 1998 - A táncparkett varázsa (Vol.1)
- 1999 - A táncparkett varázsa (Vol.2)
- 2000 - Funknstein és a Klikk - 139 km
- 2001 - Da Flava család
- 2002 - Egy átlagos külvárosi történet
- 2002 - Kamikaze: Nomen est Omen (Nevében a végzete)
- 2003 - LTP
- 2005 - Kamikaze: Halálosan komolyan
- 2006 - Kamikaze: Tragikomédia
- 2009 - Jelentések Fanyarországról
- 2011 - Táncdalok, sanzonok, melodrámák
- 2014 - Tartsd lent!
- 2019 - Rezonancia, avagy a próféta alvilági zarándoklata (A titkos krónika)
- 2022 - Esti Mesék a Boldogság Utcából (Hangjáték)
- 2024 - Komfortzóna

== Sources/External links (in Hungarian) ==
- http://www.zeneszoveg.hu/egyuttes/3415/funktasztikus--dalszovegei.html
- https://www.facebook.com/pages/Funktasztikus/187649627940299?sk=info
