= Matyó =

Hungarian subgroup

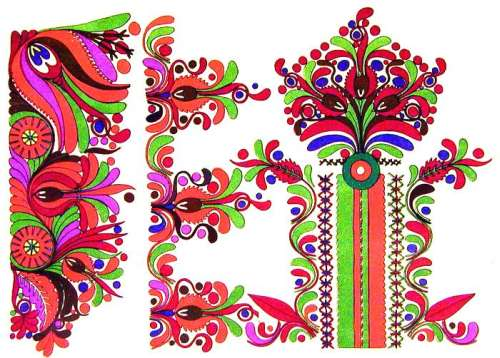
Matyó szűr (a traditional garment) embroidery

The Matyó are a subgroup of Hungarians. The Matyó populate an ethnographic region in Northern Hungary, called "Matyó Land (Matyóföld)". Matyó Land consists of the town of Mezőkövesd and its vicinity. The Matyó have retained distinctive traditions, costumes and embroidery.

== Origin ==
Traditionally, the Matyó and Palóc populations were considered to share common ancestors but recent researches question this shared origin.
