= Bogács =

- Village
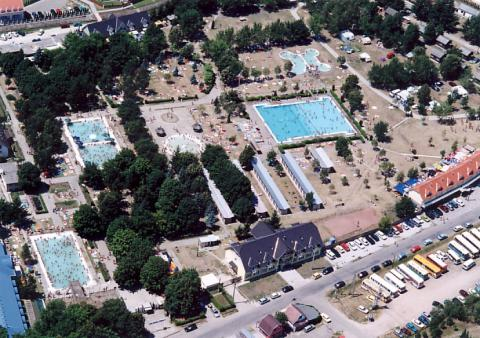

- Flag Coat of arms

- Location of Bogács
- Coordinates: 47.90312°N 20.53194°E
- Country: Hungary
- Region: Northern Hungary
- County: Borsod-Abaúj-Zemplén
- District: Mezőkövesd

Area
  - Total: 24.69 km^{2} (9.53 sq mi)

Population (1 January 2025)
  - Total: 1,909
  - Density: 77.32/km^{2} (200.3/sq mi)
- Time zone: UTC+1 (CET)
  - Summer (DST): UTC+2 (CEST)
- Postal code: 3412
- Area code: (+36) 49
- Website: www.bogacs.hu

Bogács is a village in Borsod-Abaúj-Zemplén county, Hungary. The town is primarily built around the Bogácsi Gyógy és Strandfürdő (Bogács Thermal and Beach Baths), with various accommodations in the area.

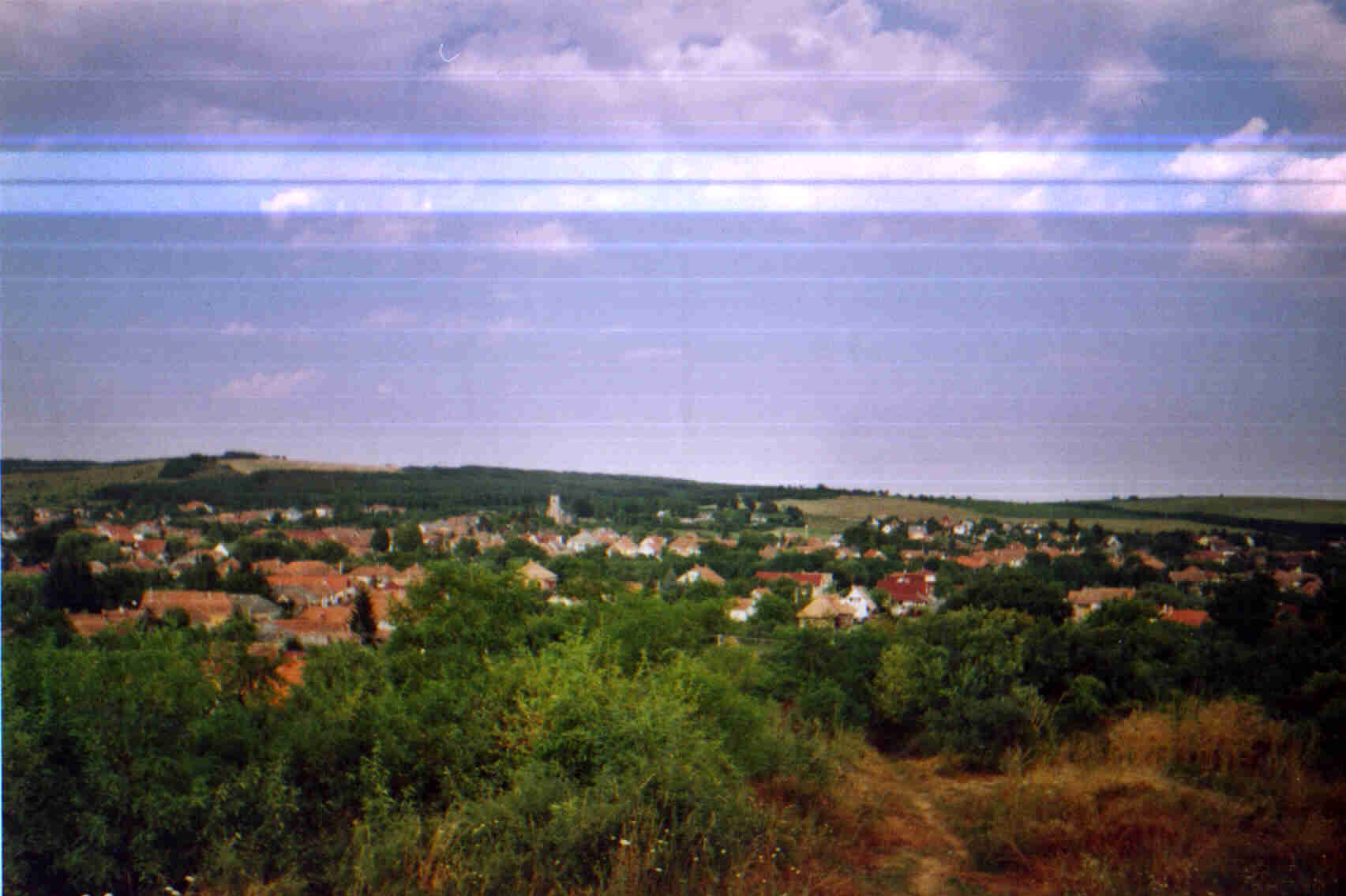

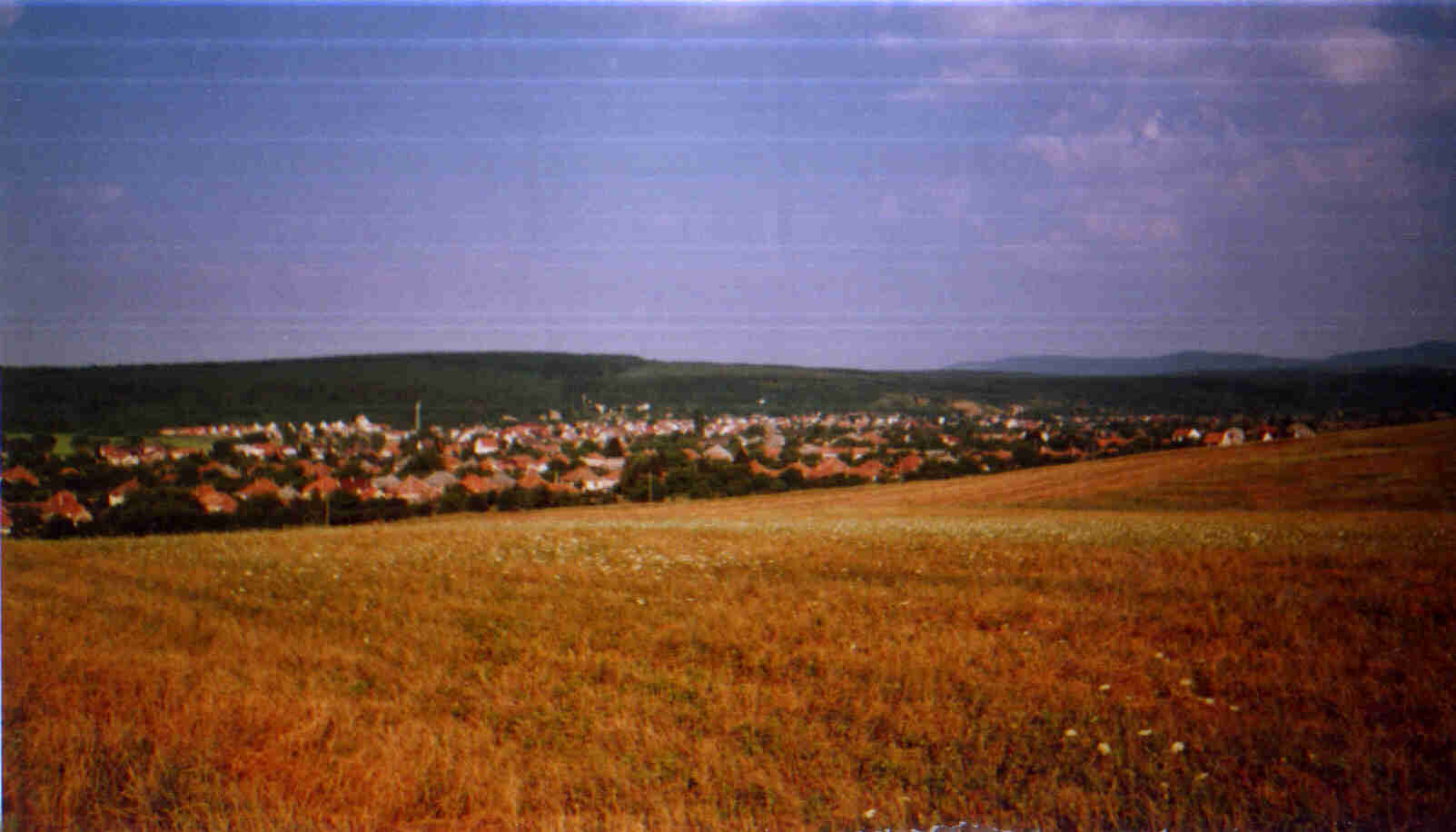

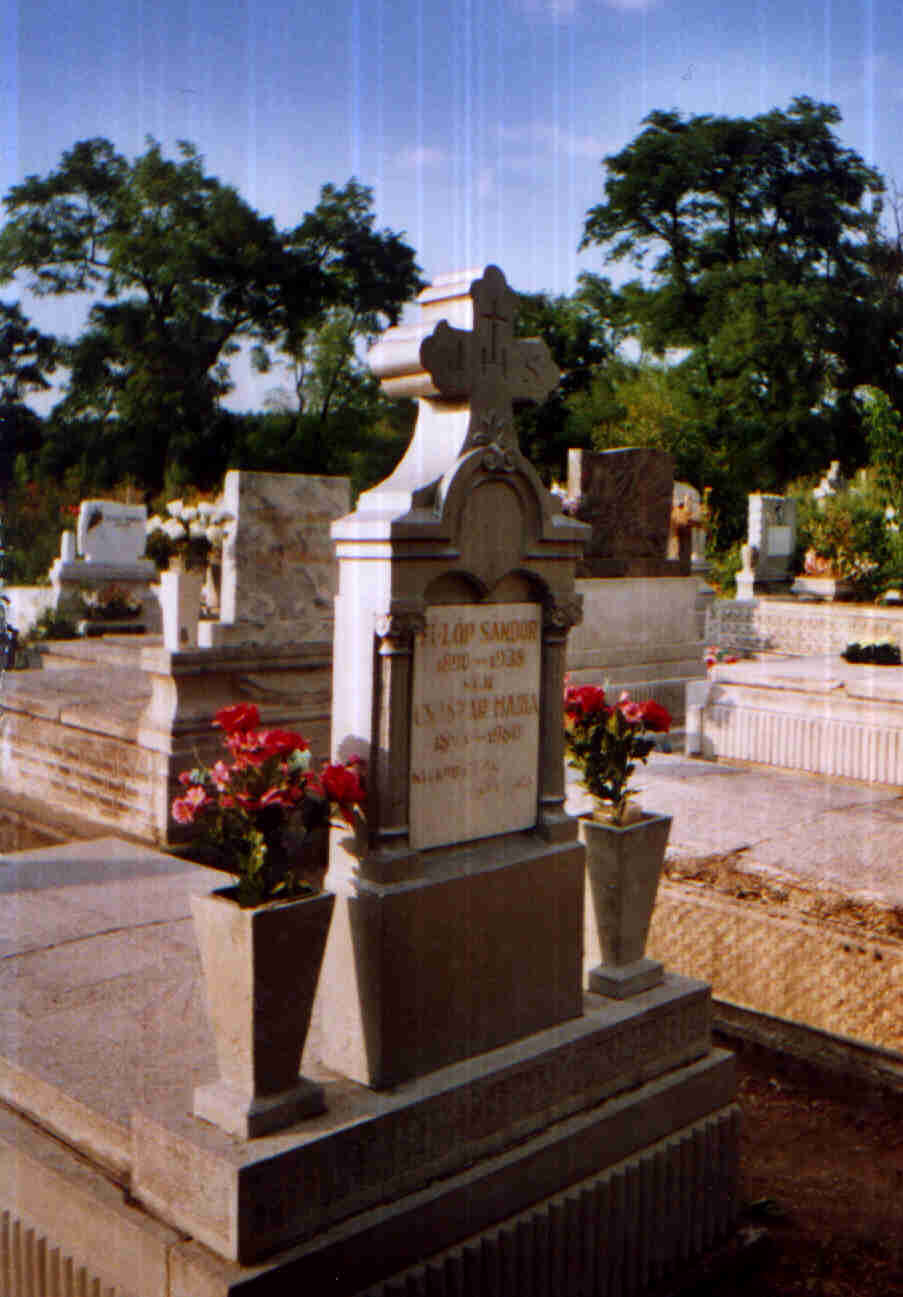

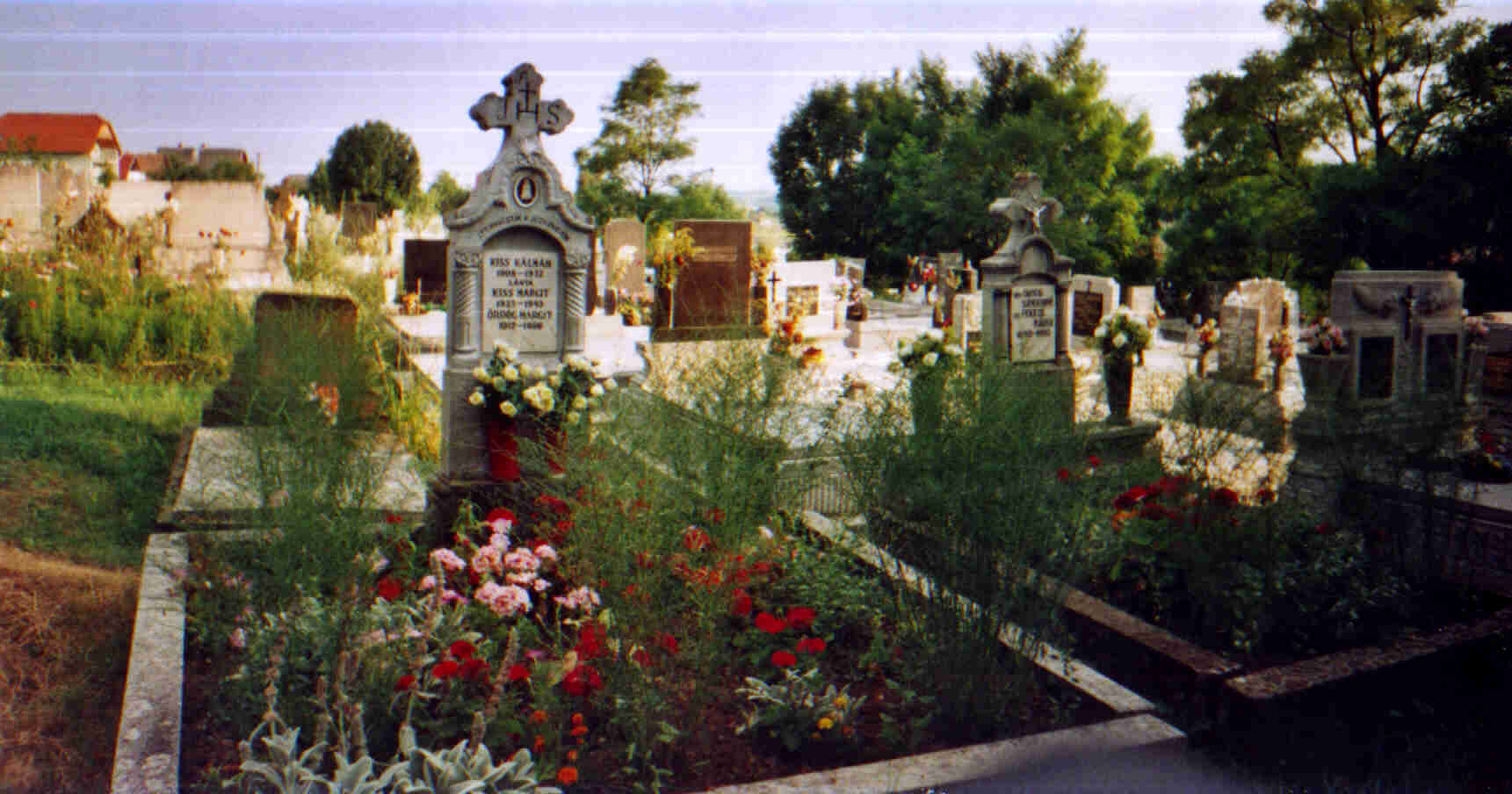

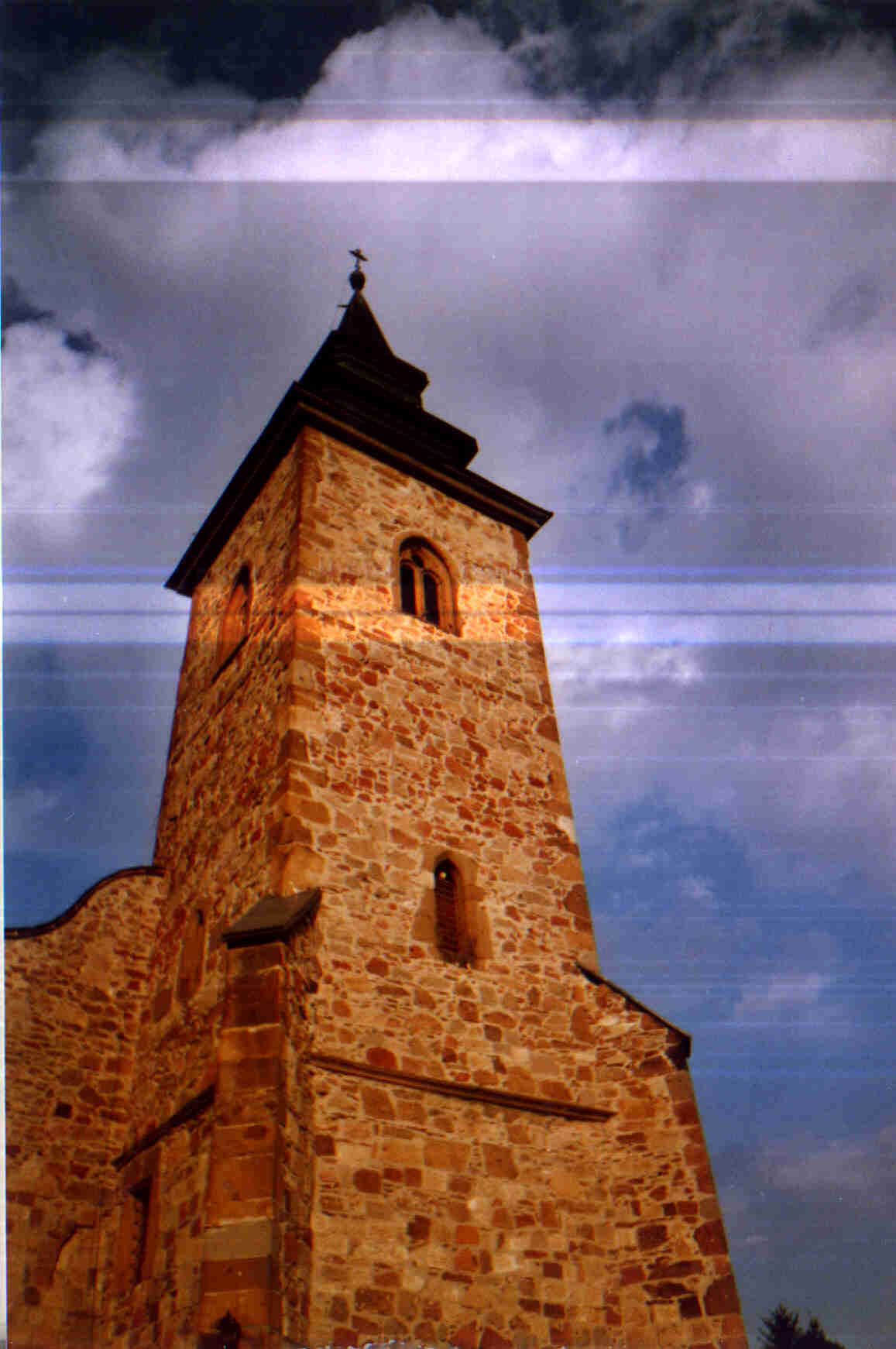

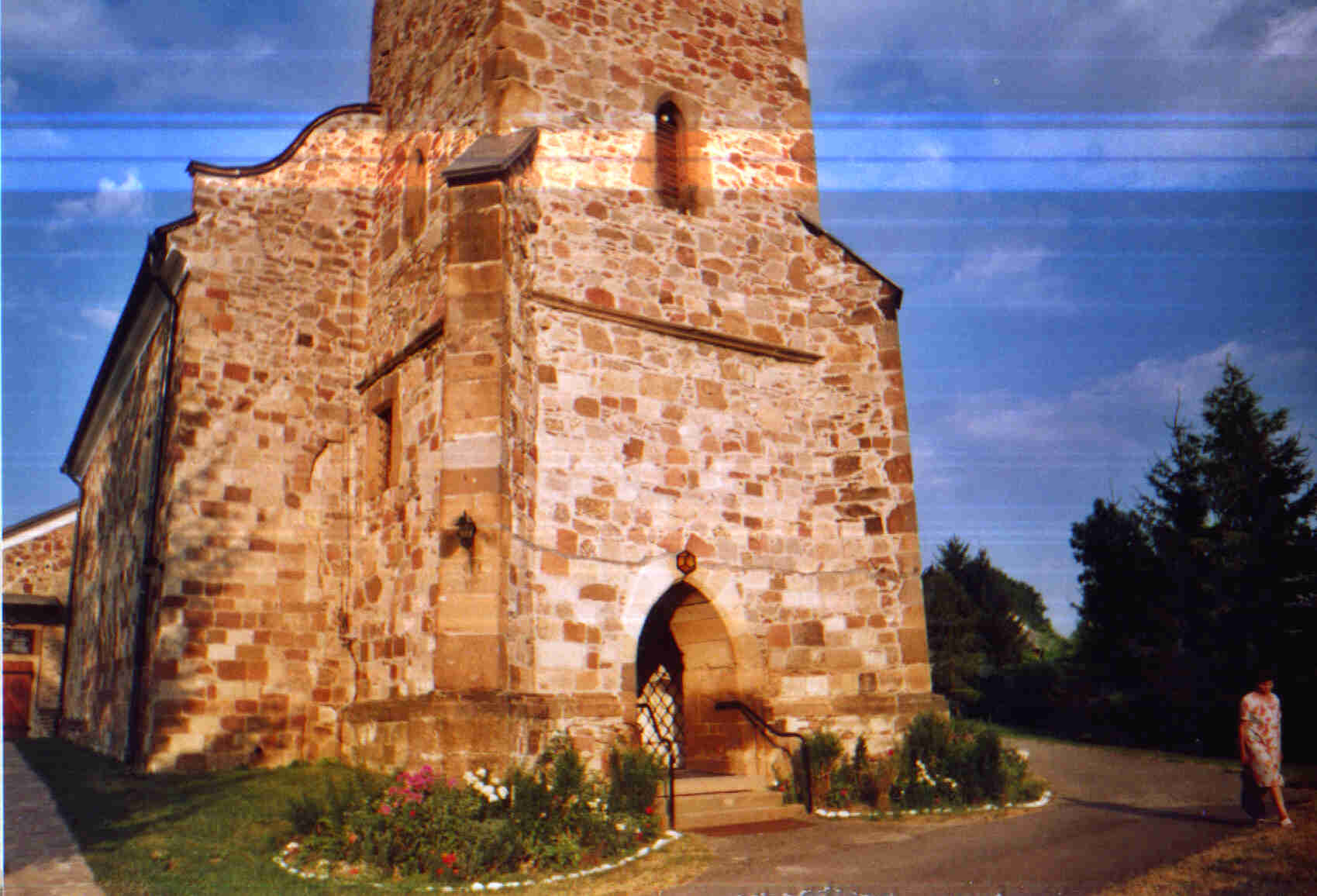
