= Vatta =

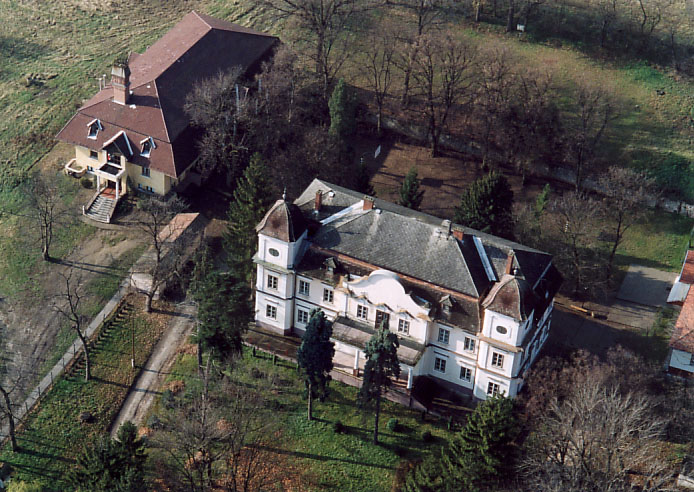
- Aerial photography of the Odescalch Castle

- Flag Coat of arms

- Location of Vatta in Hungary
- Coordinates: 47.922°N 20.738°E
- Country: Hungary
- Region: Northern Hungary
- County: Borsod-Abaúj-Zemplén
- Subregion: Mezőkövesd
- Rank: Village

Area
  - Total: 23.34 km^{2} (9.01 sq mi)

Population (2009)
  - Total: 919
  - Density: 39.4/km^{2} (102/sq mi)
- Time zone: UTC+1 (CET)
  - Summer (DST): UTC+2 (CEST)
- Postal code: 3431
- Area code: +36 49
- KSH code: 30076
- Website: https://vatta.hu/

Vatta is a village in Borsod-Abaúj-Zemplén County, Hungary. It lies in the south of the county, 30 km (20 mi) from Miskolc and 19 km (12 mi) from Mezőkövesd.

== Etymology ==
According to local tradition, the name of Vatta from the name of an 11th-century pagan tribal chief called "Vata".

== History ==
The first known record of the village is in a charter of 1323. In the following centuries it was known as Vatha, Woytha, Watha, and Bata. From 1475 the settlement was recorded as Alsóvatta ("Lower Vatta") and Felsővatta ("Upper Vatta"), which indicates that there were two distinct and separate settlements. These combined later.

During the Ottoman rule of the 16th century, the village was razed and the inhabitants had to flee several times.

In 1895 Vatta became a town, and from 1950 an independent village. After Communist rule, in 1990 the village got its own parish council.

== Landmarks ==
- Odescalch Castle, built in the 18th century.
- Roman Catholic church, built in the 18th century in the Baroque style, dedicated to Saint Mary the Virgin.
- Reform Church.
- Monument of Heros, by János Pásztor, erected in 1926.

== Notable people ==
- Bertalan Szemere, the second prime minister of Hungary, was born in Vatta on 27 August 1812.
