= Tiszavalk =

- Location of Borsod-Abaúj-Zemplén county in Hungary

- Location of Tiszavalk
- Coordinates: 47.68839°N 20.74956°E
- Country: Hungary
- County: Borsod-Abaúj-Zemplén

Area
  - Total: 11.54 km^{2} (4.46 sq mi)

Population (2004)
  - Total: 339
  - Density: 29.37/km^{2} (76.1/sq mi)
- Time zone: UTC+1 (CET)
  - Summer (DST): UTC+2 (CEST)
- Postal code: 3464
- Area code: 49

Tiszavalk is a village in Borsod-Abaúj-Zemplén county, Hungary.
