= Csincse =

- Village
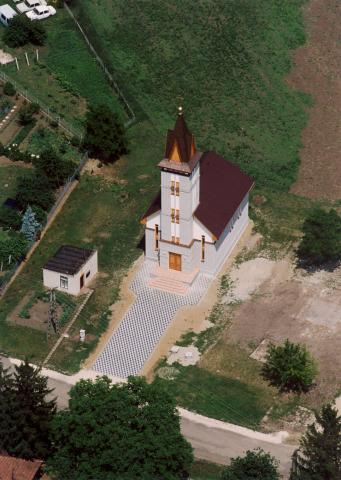

- Flag Coat of arms

- Location of Csincse
- Coordinates: 47.88657°N 20.76845°E
- Country: Hungary
- Region: Northern Hungary
- County: Borsod-Abaúj-Zemplén
- District: Mezőkövesd

Area
  - Total: 11.34 km^{2} (4.38 sq mi)

Population (1 January 2025)
  - Total: 470
  - Density: 41/km^{2} (110/sq mi)
- Time zone: UTC+1 (CET)
  - Summer (DST): UTC+2 (CEST)
- Postal code: 3442
- Area code: (+36) 49
- Website: csincse.eoldal.hu

Csincse is a village in Borsod-Abaúj-Zemplén county, Hungary.
