= Mezőnyárád =

- Village
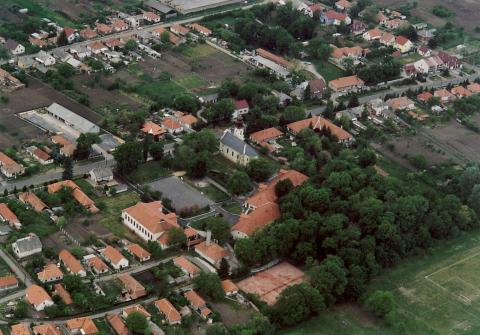

- Flag Coat of arms

- Location of Mezőnyárád
- Coordinates: 47.84705°N 20.674181°E
- Country: Hungary
- Region: Northern Hungary
- County: Borsod-Abaúj-Zemplén
- District: Mezőkövesd

Area
  - Total: 14.07 km^{2} (5.43 sq mi)

Population (1 January 2026)
  - Total: 1,506
  - Density: 107.0/km^{2} (277.2/sq mi)
- Time zone: UTC+1 (CET)
  - Summer (DST): UTC+2 (CEST)
- Postal code: 3421
- Area code: (+36) 49
- Website: www.mezonyarad.hu

Mezőnyárád is a village in Borsod-Abaúj-Zemplén County in northeastern Hungary.
