= Cserépfalu =

- Flag Coat of arms

- Location of Borsod-Abaúj-Zemplén county in Hungary

- Location of Cserépfalu
- Coordinates: 47.94041°N 20.53506°E
- Country: Hungary
- County: Borsod-Abaúj-Zemplén

Area
  - Total: 44.64 km^{2} (17.24 sq mi)

Population (2004)
  - Total: 1,083
  - Density: 24.26/km^{2} (62.8/sq mi)
- Time zone: UTC+1 (CET)
  - Summer (DST): UTC+2 (CEST)
- Postal code: 3413
- Area code: 49

Cserépfalu is a village in Borsod-Abaúj-Zemplén county, Hungary.
