= Négyes =

Coordinates: 47°42′N 20°43′E

- Village
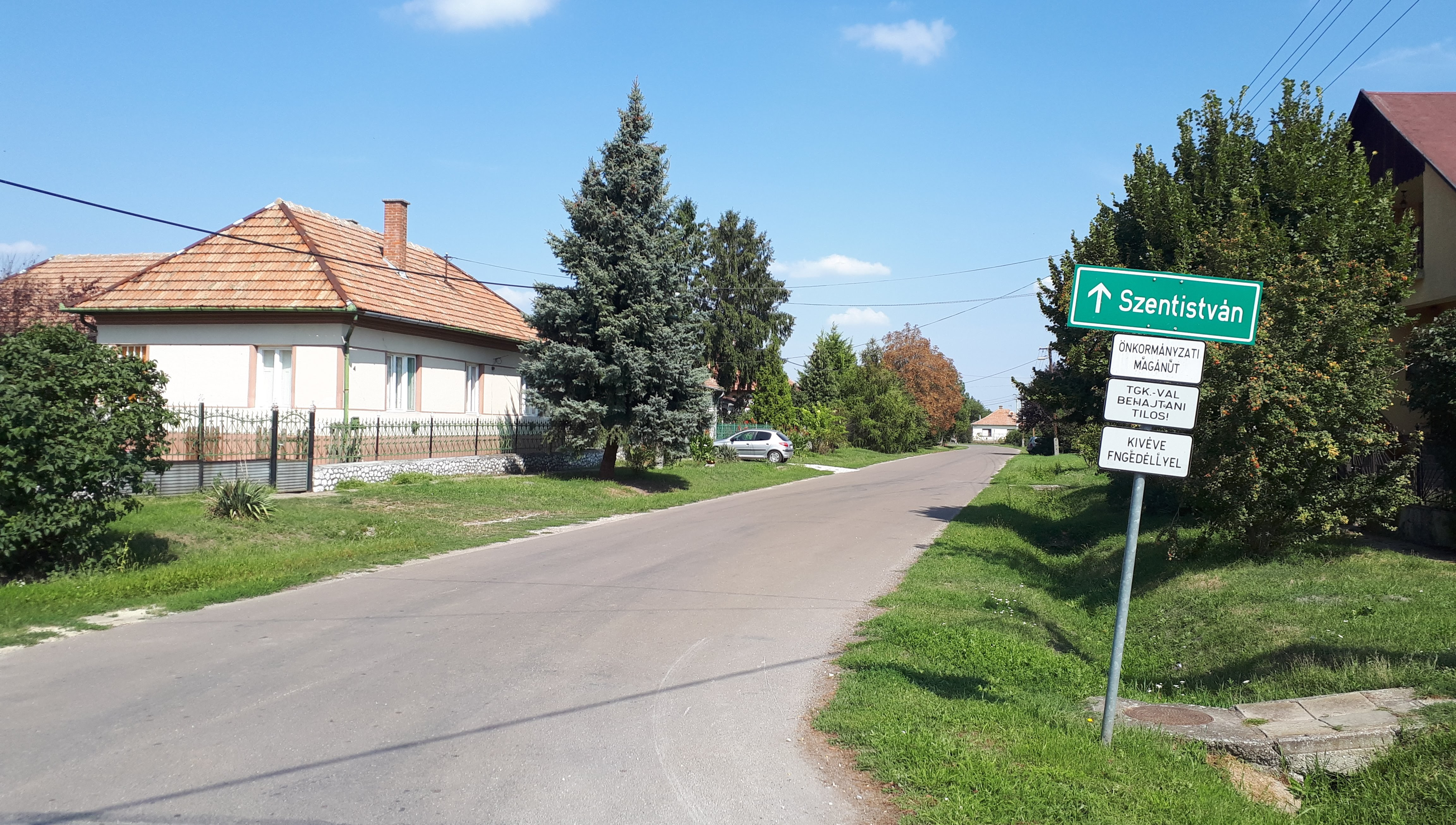
- A Négyes-Szentistván út négyesi vége
- Interactive map of Négyes
- Country: Hungary
- Regions: Northern Hungary
- County: Borsod-Abaúj-Zemplén County
- Time zone: UTC+1 (CET)
  - Summer (DST): UTC+2 (CEST)

Négyes is a village in Borsod-Abaúj-Zemplén County in northeastern Hungary.
