= Bükkzsérc =

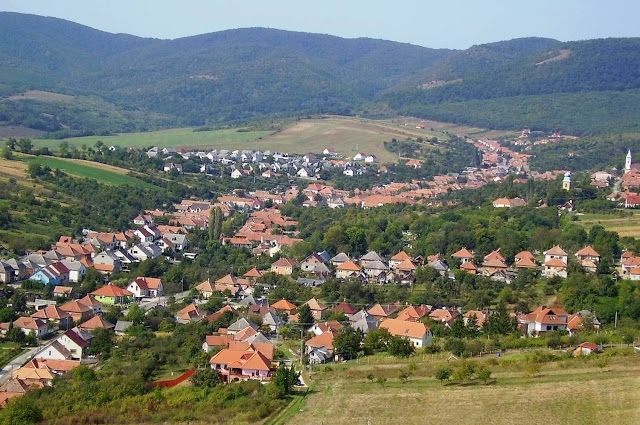

- Coat of arms

- Location of Bükkzsérc in Hungary
- Coordinates: 47.9596°N 20.5009°E
- Country: Hungary
- Region: Northern Hungary
- County: Borsod-Abaúj-Zemplén

Area
  - Total: 37.25 km^{2} (14.38 sq mi)

Population (2012)
  - Total: 950
  - Density: 26/km^{2} (66/sq mi)
- Time zone: UTC+1 (CET)
  - Summer (DST): UTC+2 (CEST)
- Postal code: 3414
- Area code: +36 49
- Website: http://bukkzserc.hu

Bükkzsérc is a village in Borsod-Abaúj-Zemplén county, Hungary. It is the southern border of Bükk National Park.

== History ==
The settlement was first mentioned in 1248, as property of the bishopric of Eger. Estate of the Carthusian order in 1457. In 1552 the town was ransacked by the Turks.

== Sights ==
- Its Catholic church (1776) is a monument.
- In its Calvinist church (1828) there are several extraordinary inner woodcarvings.
- About 30 peasant houses enjoy local protection.
- The exhibition of the Panish Memorial Hall shows the folk life on old photo replicas.
- The first wood carvings of the country picked by a panel of experts are of ancient monument character, we can see them in the Pelyhe Cellar Museum.
- We also have to mention the world war monuments,
- the private hunt trophy collections and
- the horseshoe shaped rocky (natural) formation in the Hódos hill with a diameter of 100 m.
- Within its boundaries we can find the best ground cycling track in the area.

== Main events ==
- Whit Saturday's Wine Competition
- Village Days in summer

== Gallery ==
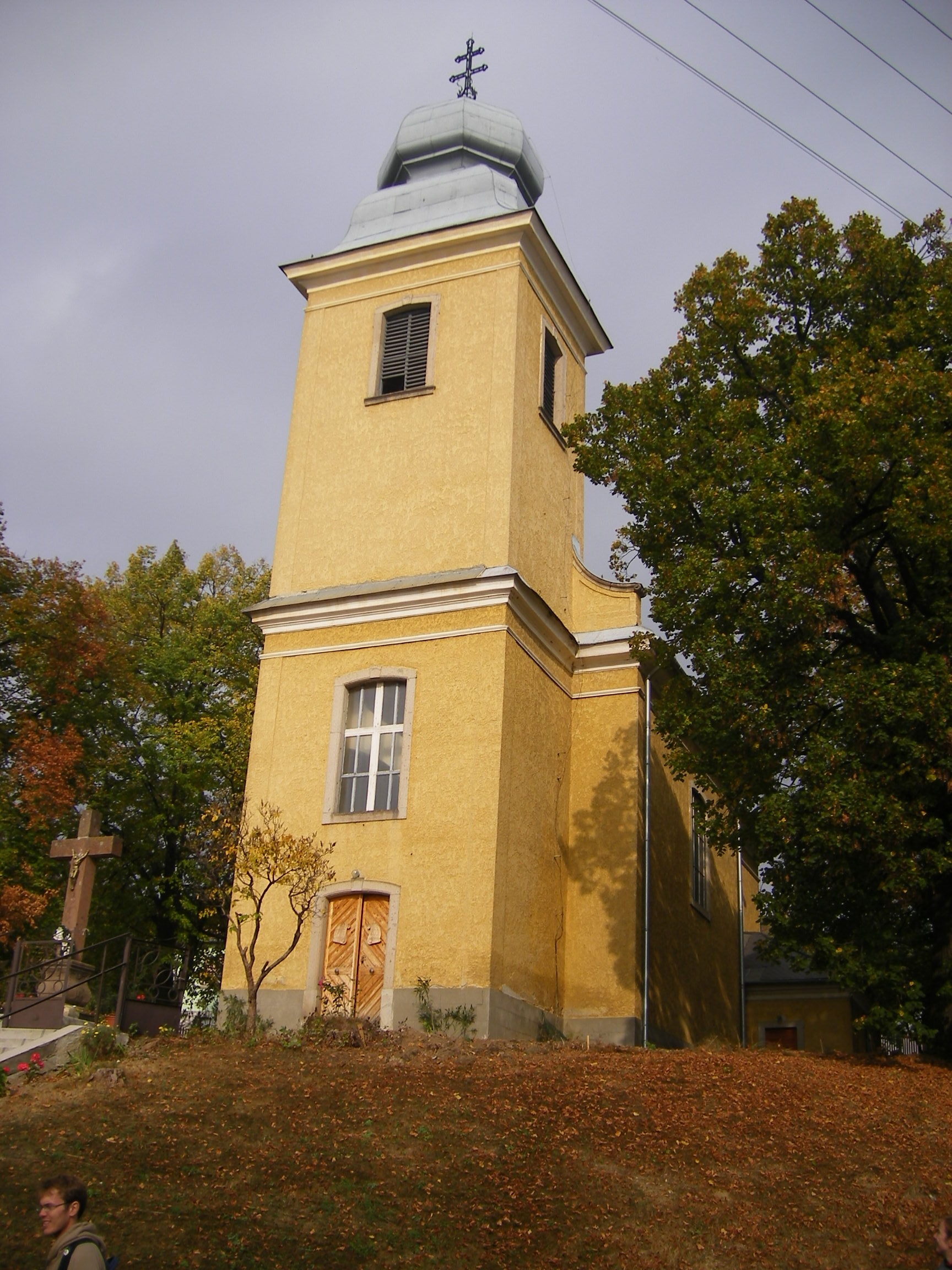
Catholic Church

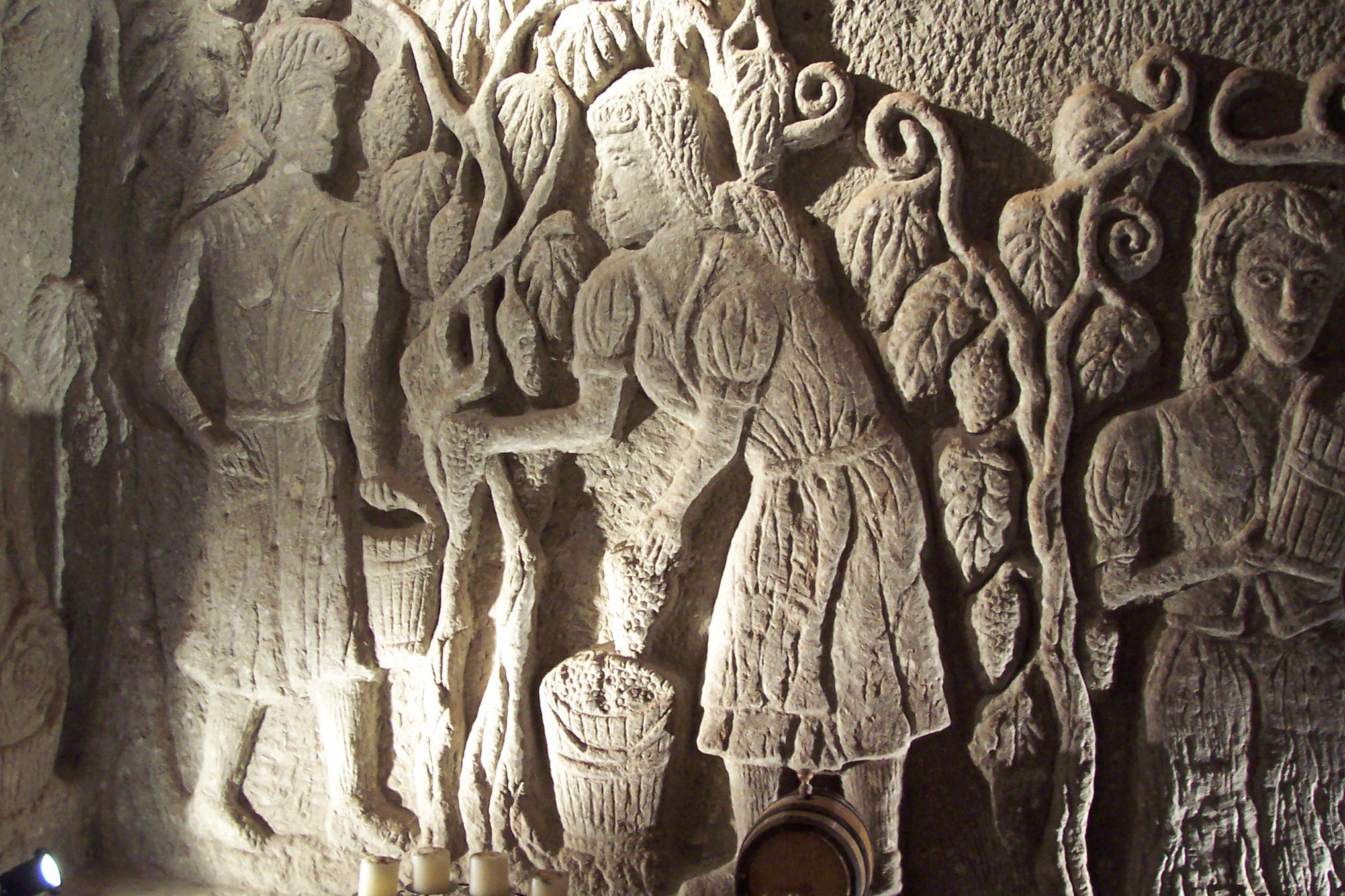
Carvings in a cellar

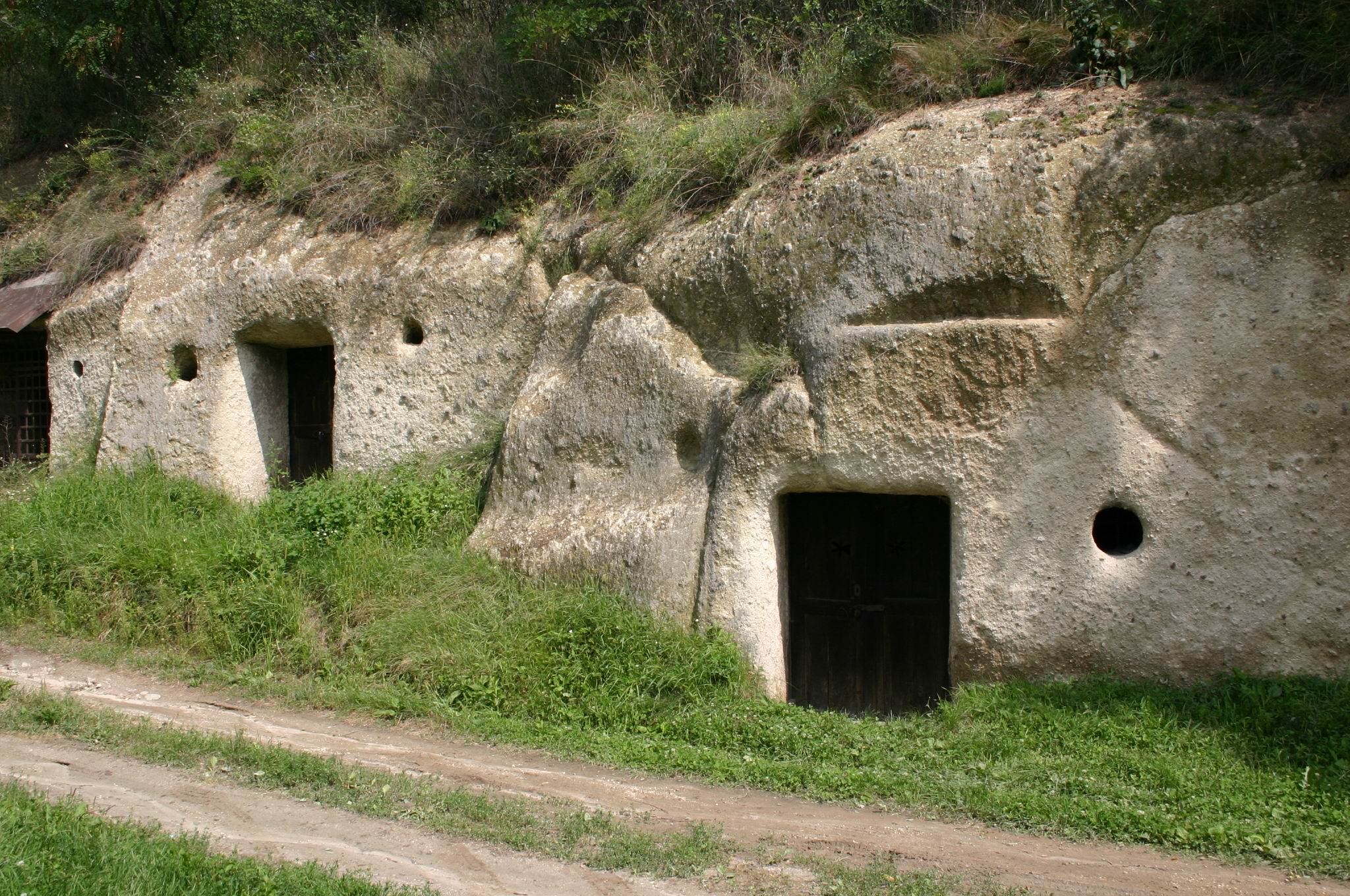
Wine cellars in Bükkzsérc
