= Egerlövő =

- Village
- Location within Hungary
- Coordinates: 47°43′14.77″N 20°37′19.38″E
- Country: Hungary
- Regions: Northern Hungary
- County: Borsod-Abaúj-Zemplén County

Area
  - Total: 19.83 km^{2} (7.66 sq mi)

Population (2008)
  - Total: 586
- Time zone: UTC+1 (CET)
  - Summer (DST): UTC+2 (CEST)

Egerlövő is a village in Borsod-Abaúj-Zemplén County in northeastern Hungary. As of 2008 it had a population of 586.
