= Borsodgeszt =

- Coat of arms

- Location of Borsod-Abaúj-Zemplén county in Hungary

- Location of Borsodgeszt
- Coordinates: 47.9561°N 20.69400°E
- Country: Hungary
- County: Borsod-Abaúj-Zemplén

Area
  - Total: 15.06 km^{2} (5.81 sq mi)

Population (2018)
  - Total: 251
  - Density: 19.38/km^{2} (50.2/sq mi)
- Time zone: UTC+1 (CET)
  - Summer (DST): UTC+2 (CEST)
- Postal code: 3426
- Area code: 49

Borsodgeszt is a village in Borsod-Abaúj-Zemplén county, Hungary.
