= Borsodivánka =

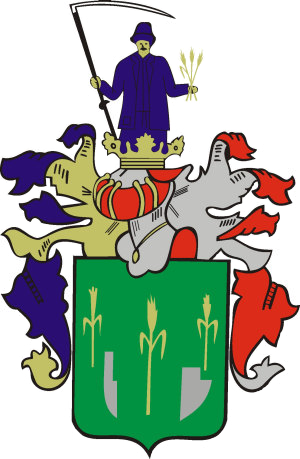
- Seal

- Location of Borsod-Abaúj-Zemplén county in Hungary

- Location of Borsodivánka
- Coordinates: 47.70119°N 20.65715°E
- Country: Hungary
- County: Borsod-Abaúj-Zemplén

Area
  - Total: 15.9 km^{2} (6.1 sq mi)

Population (2004)
  - Total: 736
  - Density: 46.28/km^{2} (119.9/sq mi)
- Time zone: UTC+1 (CET)
  - Summer (DST): UTC+2 (CEST)
- Postal code: 3462
- Area code: 49

Borsodivánka is a village in Borsod-Abaúj-Zemplén county, Hungary.
