= Tard, Hungary =

Tard
- Village
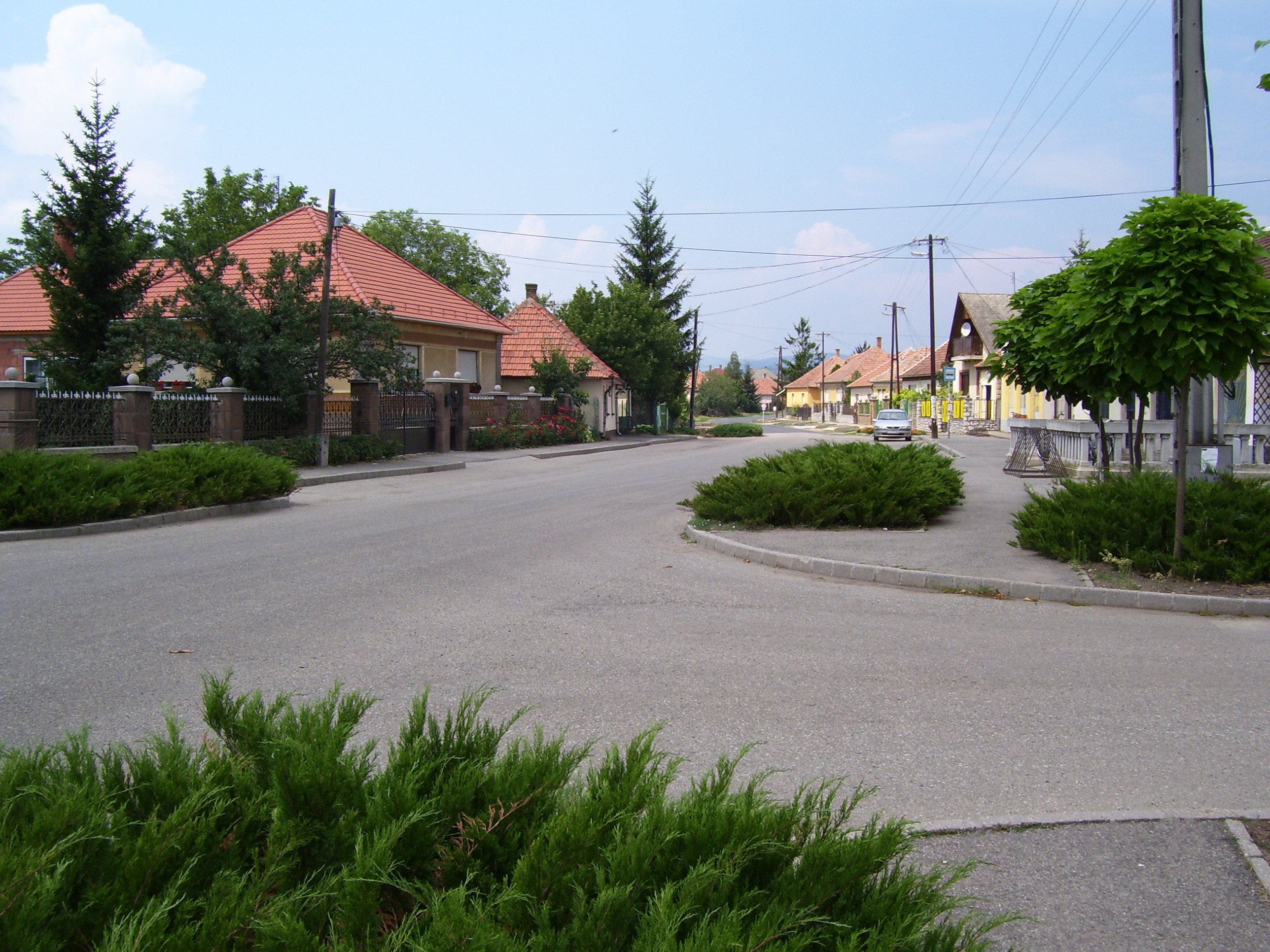
- Béke út, the main street in Tard

- Flag Coat of arms

- Location of Tard
- Coordinates: 47.87858°N 20.59881°E
- Country: Hungary
- Region: Northern Hungary
- County: Borsod-Abaúj-Zemplén
- District: Mezőkövesd

Area
  - Total: 40.49 km^{2} (15.63 sq mi)

Population (1 January 2026)
  - Total: 1,007
  - Density: 24.87/km^{2} (64.41/sq mi)
- Time zone: UTC+1 (CET)
  - Summer (DST): UTC+2 (CEST)
- Postal code: 3416
- Area code: (+36) 49
- Website: www.tard.hu

Tard is a village in Borsod-Abaúj-Zemplén county, Hungary. It is located 4 km from main road No. 3, along side-road No. 25 113. It sits on the edge of the Bükk National Park.

== Climate ==
It is moderately warm and dry, the average annual temperature is 9 °C, in January -2 °C, and in July 16 °C. The number of sunny hours per year is 1,900, and the average annual precipitation is 630 mm. The special feature of its weather is the sudden floods from Bükk in the summer, caused by large amounts of precipitation due to the low water permeability of the Tardi stream.

== Etymology ==
The village probably got its name from the diminutive version of the word "tar".
