= Tibolddaróc =

- Village
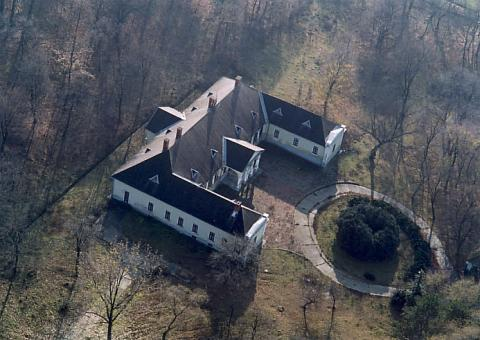

- Flag Coat of arms

- Location of Tibolddaróc in Hungary
- Coordinates: 47.9213°N 20.637°E
- Country: Hungary
- Region: Northern Hungary
- County: Borsod-Abaúj-Zemplén

Area
  - Total: 30.3 km^{2} (11.7 sq mi)

Population (2012)
  - Total: 1,417
  - Density: 46.8/km^{2} (121/sq mi)
- Time zone: UTC+1 (CET)
  - Summer (DST): UTC+2 (CEST)
- Area code: +36
- Website: https://tibolddaroc.eu/

Tibolddaróc is a village in Borsod-Abaúj-Zemplén County in northeastern Hungary.
