= Mezőnagymihály =

- Village
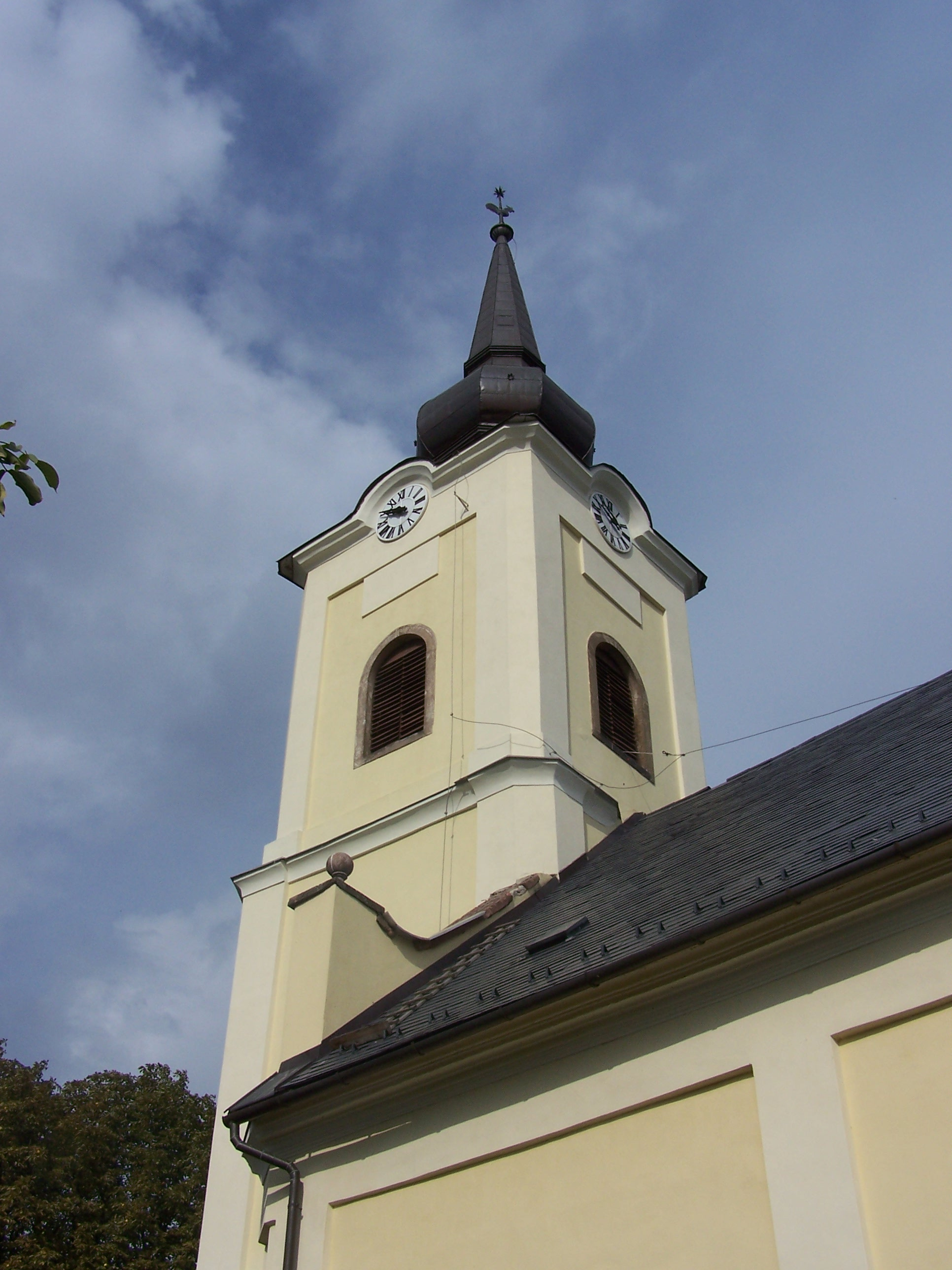
- Reformed Church in Mezőnagymihály

- Coat of arms

- Location within Hungary
- Country: Hungary
- Regions: Northern Hungary
- County: Borsod-Abaúj-Zemplén County
- Time zone: UTC+1 (CET)
  - Summer (DST): UTC+2 (CEST)

Mezőnagymihály is a village in Borsod-Abaúj-Zemplén County in northeastern Hungary. The village built at the side of Kácsi-Sályi stream in the plain, the third of the grounds was wetland.

== History ==
From its first mention in the 14th century the village's name has been written Nagmihal, Nagy Mighali or Nagymyha. During the Turkish occupation of Hungary the town was destroyed several times. The citizens escaped to the swamp next to the village. In the flat area the following 23 hamlets are part of the settlement: Almási, Dobozi, Eperjes, Egyes, Farkas, Fáy, Fenduda, Gólyás, Gyékényes, Kisgólyás, Kisecsér, Kenyérváró, Kuper, Mák, Nagyecsér, Nagyház, Pillantó, Salamon, Sezárk, Szilvási, Szomolló, Telek, Teper és Zsindelyes. The Roman Catholic Church built in 1896 named by Saint Anne.
