= Mezőkövesd =

- Town
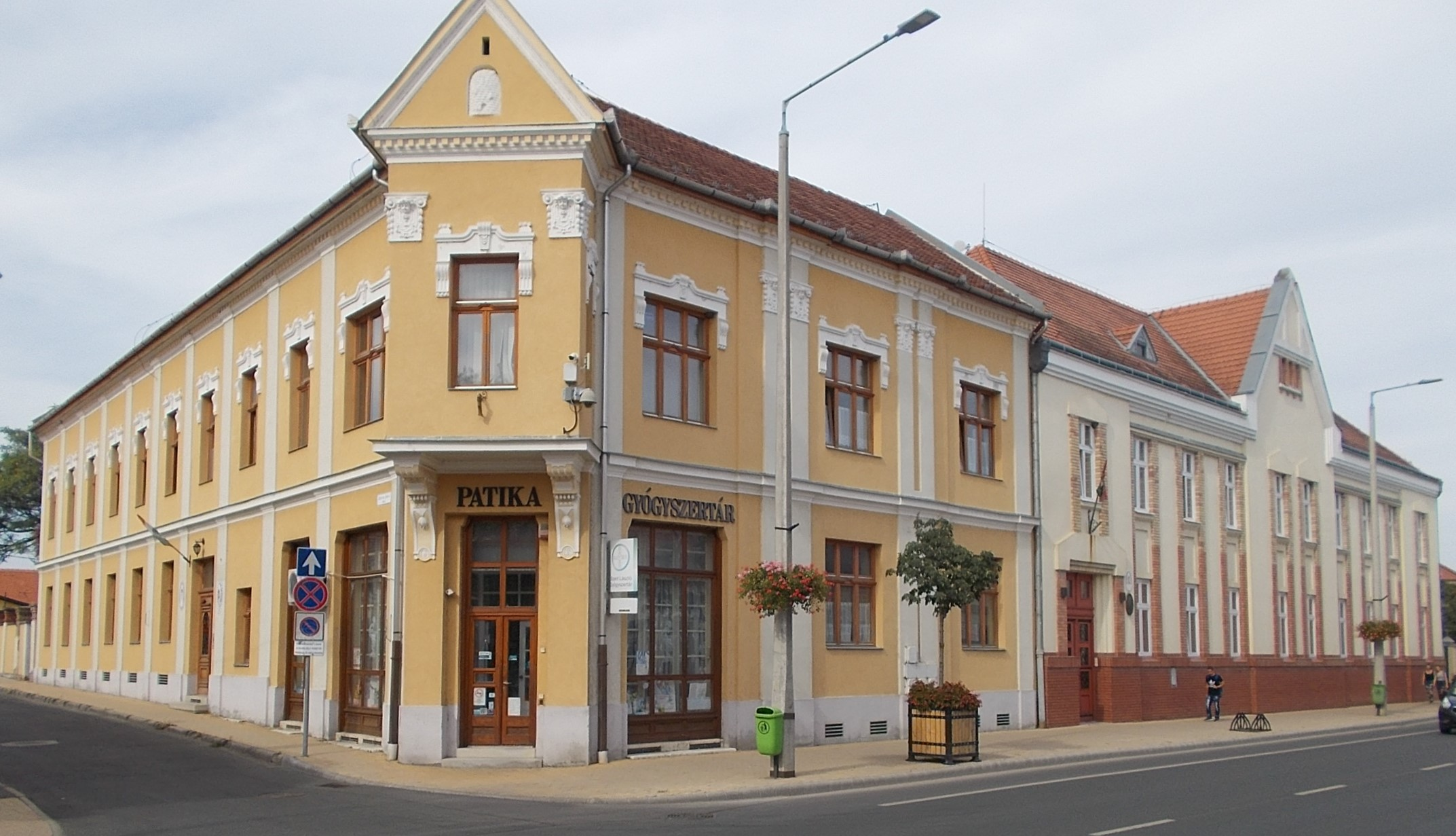
- Mátyás király út (Matthias Corvinus Street)

- Flag Coat of arms

- Location within Hungary
- Coordinates: 47°49′N 20°35′E
- Country: Hungary
- County: Borsod-Abaúj-Zemplén
- District: Mezőkövesd

Area
  - Total: 100.5 km^{2} (38.8 sq mi)

Population (2008)
  - Total: 16,905
  - Density: 177.49/km^{2} (459.7/sq mi)
- Time zone: UTC+1 (CET)
  - Summer (DST): UTC+2 (CEST)
- Postal code: 3400
- Area code: (+36) 49
- Website: www.mezokovesd.hu

Mezőkövesd [ˈmɛzøːkøvɛʒd] is a town in Borsod-Abaúj-Zemplén county, in northern Hungary. It lies 50 km (31 mi) from Miskolc and 15 km (9 mi) from Eger.

== History ==
The area has been inhabited since the Great Migration. It is likely that the first Hungarian settlement was formed here shortly after the conquest of Hungary, but in 1275 in a church document it was mentioned as a deserted place. The village was likely destroyed during the Mongol invasion of Hungary.

In the 13th century, Mezőkövesd was the southernmost town belonging to the Diósgyőr estate. In 1464 the town got a seal and privileges from King Matthias. The name of the Matyó people, who inhabited the town and the area, is likely to have come from his name.

In 1544 the town was occupied by the Turks. In 1552 – in the year when the Castle of Eger was under siege by the Turks – Mezőkövesd was completely destroyed. Though it was rebuilt, after the battle in the nearby village of Mezőkeresztes, it was destroyed again in 1596 and wasn't rebuilt for almost 100 years.

Until 1784 Mezőkövesd was royal estate. In that year the town freed itself from its feudal obligations. The following years brought prosperity. In 1860 the railway line reached the town.

In 1938 a thermal spring was found in the estate of Lajos Zsóry. A thermal bath was built and now it is one of the main tourist attractions of the town. In 1941 the town had 21,000 residents, the highest population ever recorded.

Before World War II, there was a Jewish community in Mezőkövesd. At its height, there were 862 Jews in the community most of them were murdered by the Nazis in the Holocaust.

== Sights ==
- Matyó Museum
- Museum of Agriculture
- Zsóry Thermal Baths, with indoor and outdoor swimming and medicinal pools. The sulphur-rich waters of the medicinal pools have curative properties.
- Matyó homes, streets with the atmosphere of 19th-century country towns - also called "Hadas" district, meaning that people who used to live here inhabited the area in big family groups. In the ancient cottages local folk artists offer a view of what it is like to be "Matyó". The houses give home to embroiderers, a furniture painter, a glass cutter, a potter and for the children: a gingerbread maker, among other craftsmen.

== Twin towns – sister cities ==
Mezőkövesd is twinned with:

- Bad Salzungen, Germany
- Petriolo, Italy
- Rüdesheim am Rhein, Germany
- Târgu Secuiesc, Romania
- Żory, Poland

== Gallery ==
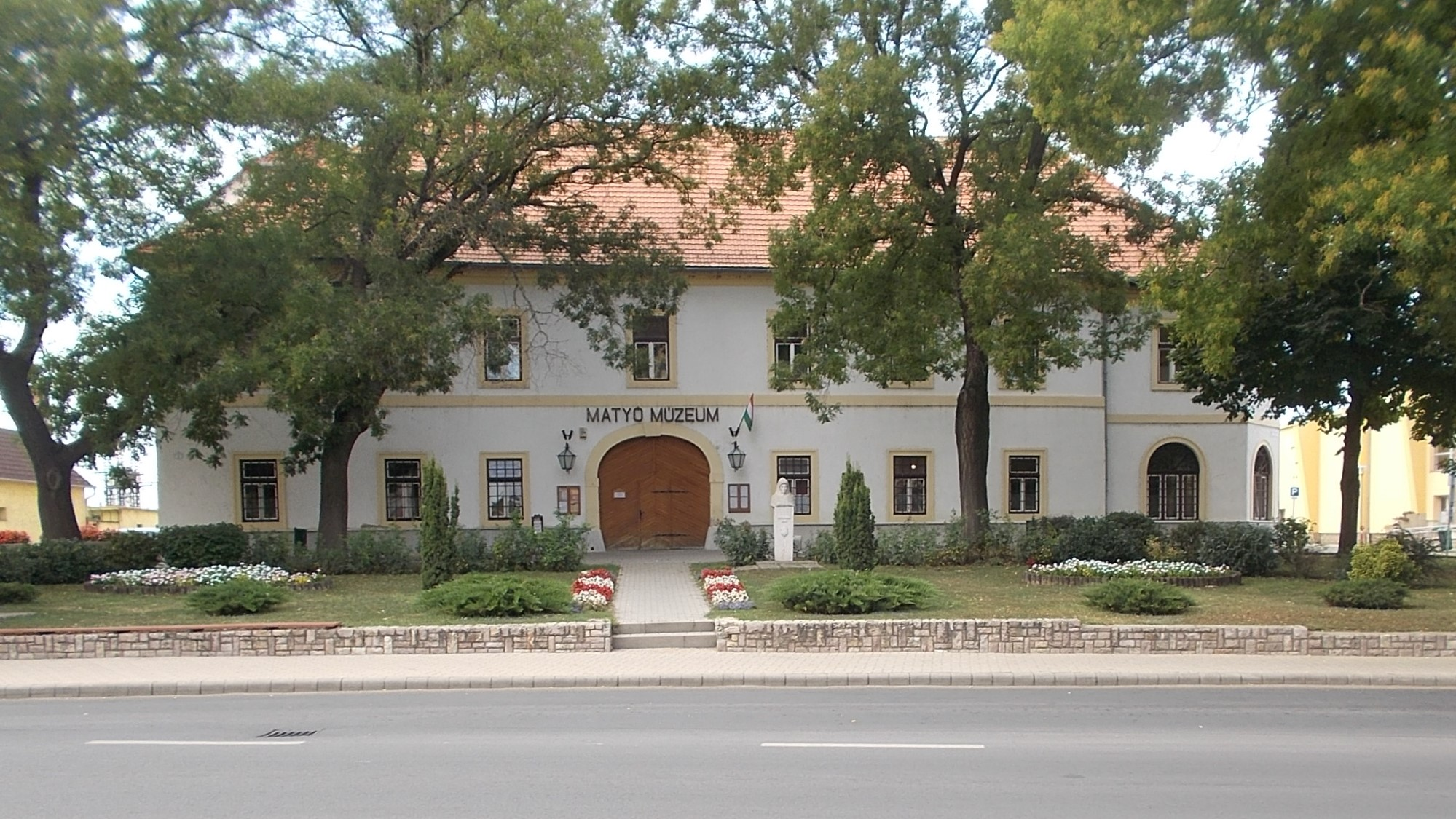
Matyó Museum

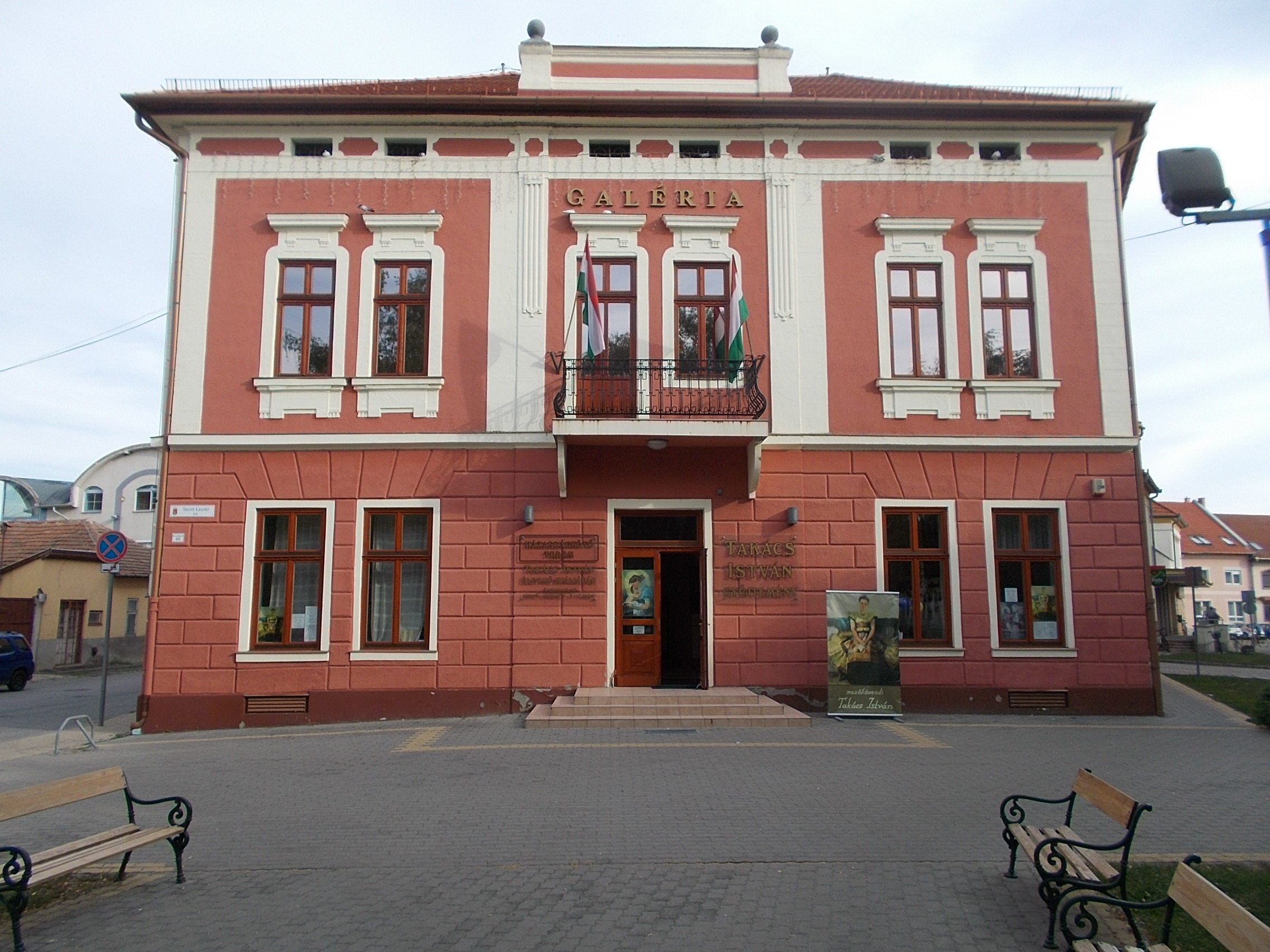
Town Gallery

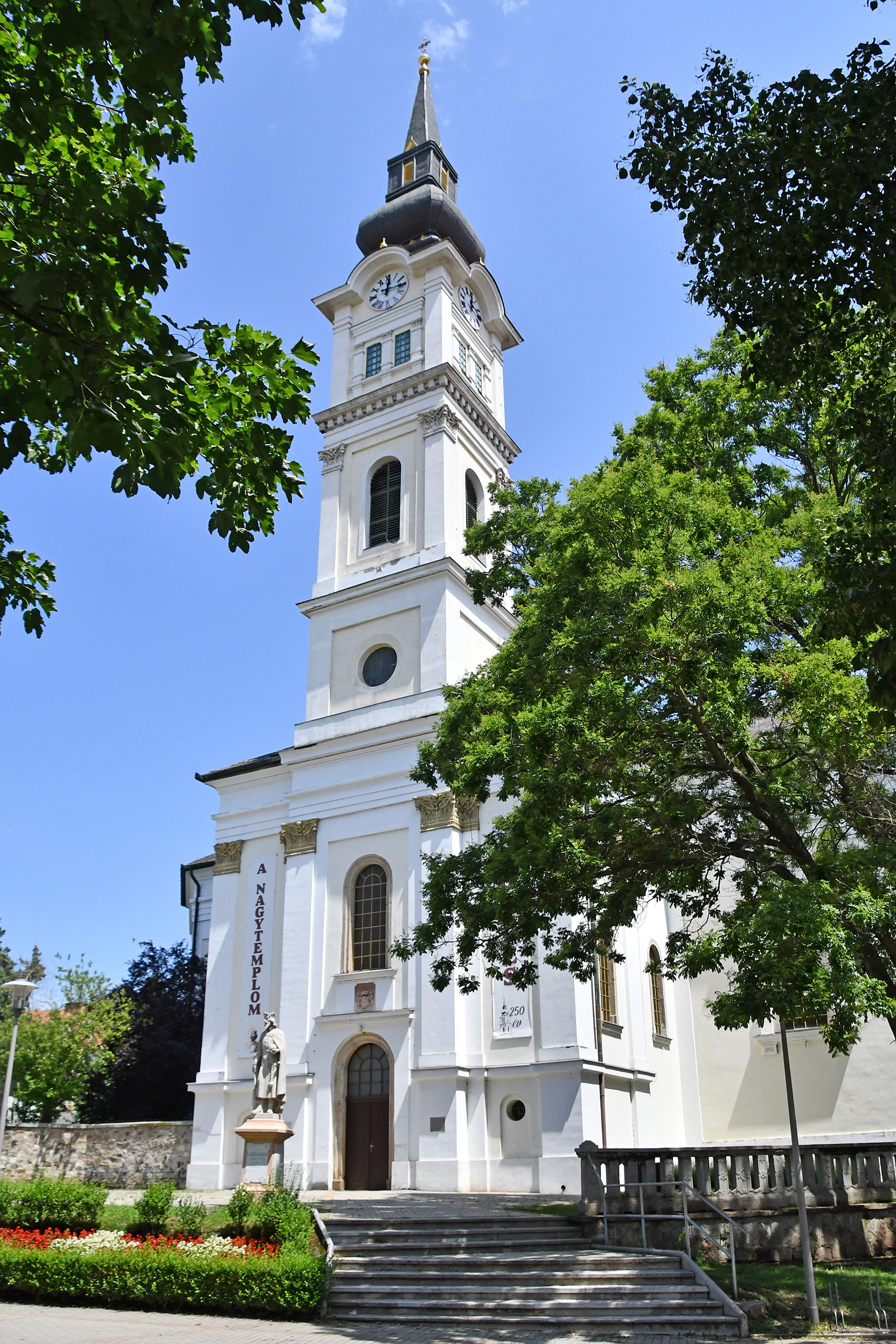
Saint Ladislaus church

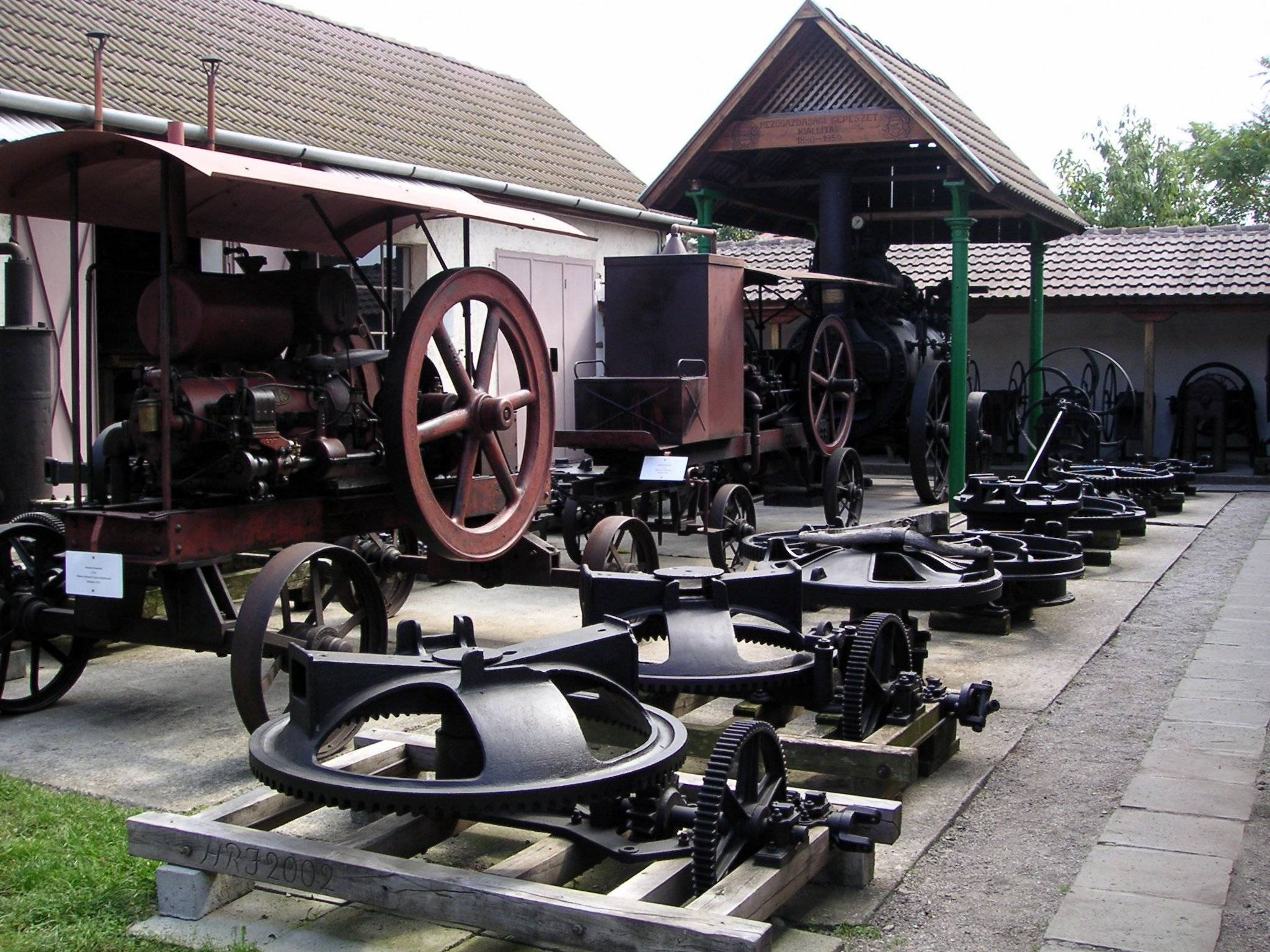
Agricultural Machine Museum

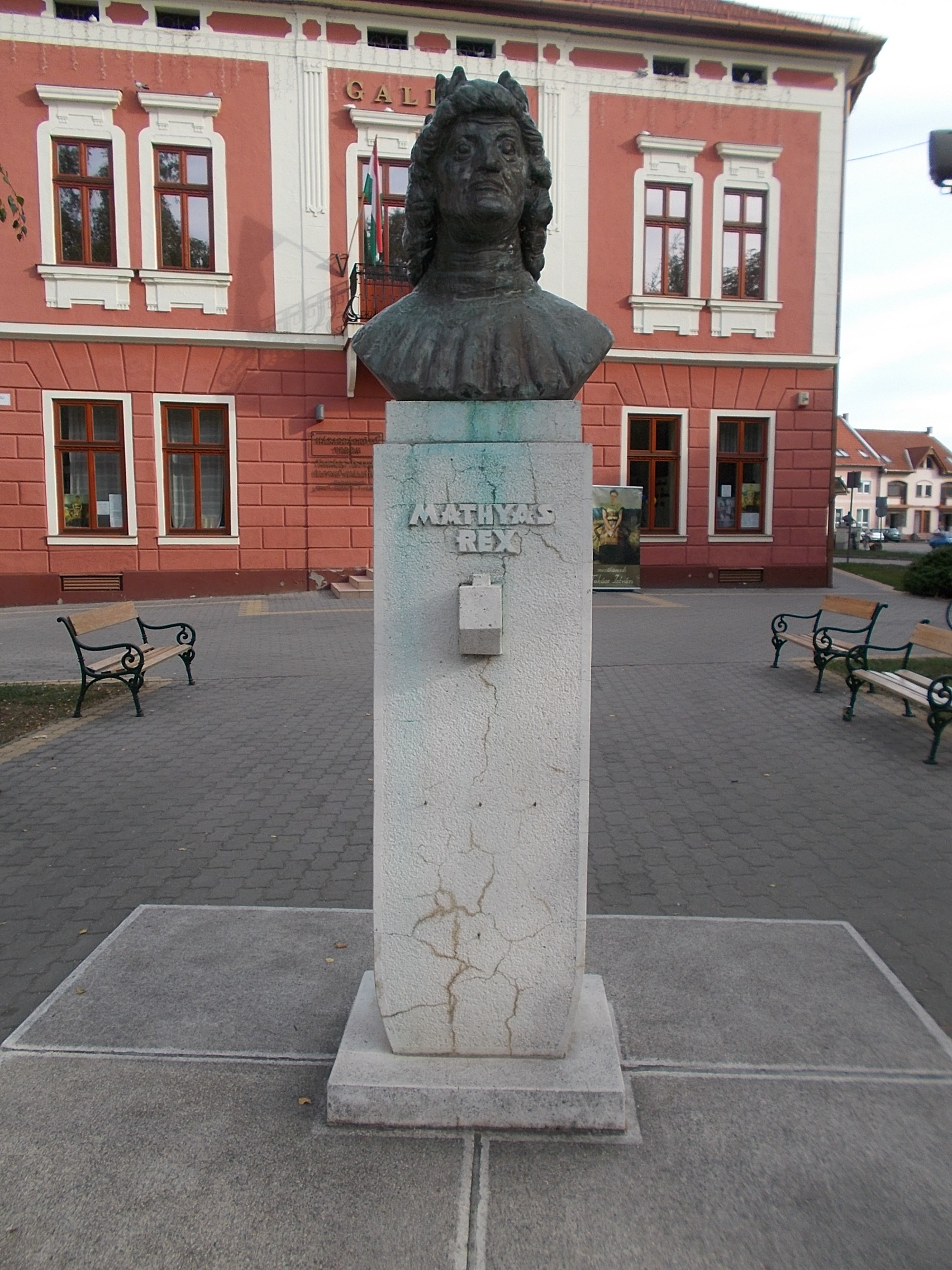
Bust of King Matthias Corvinus

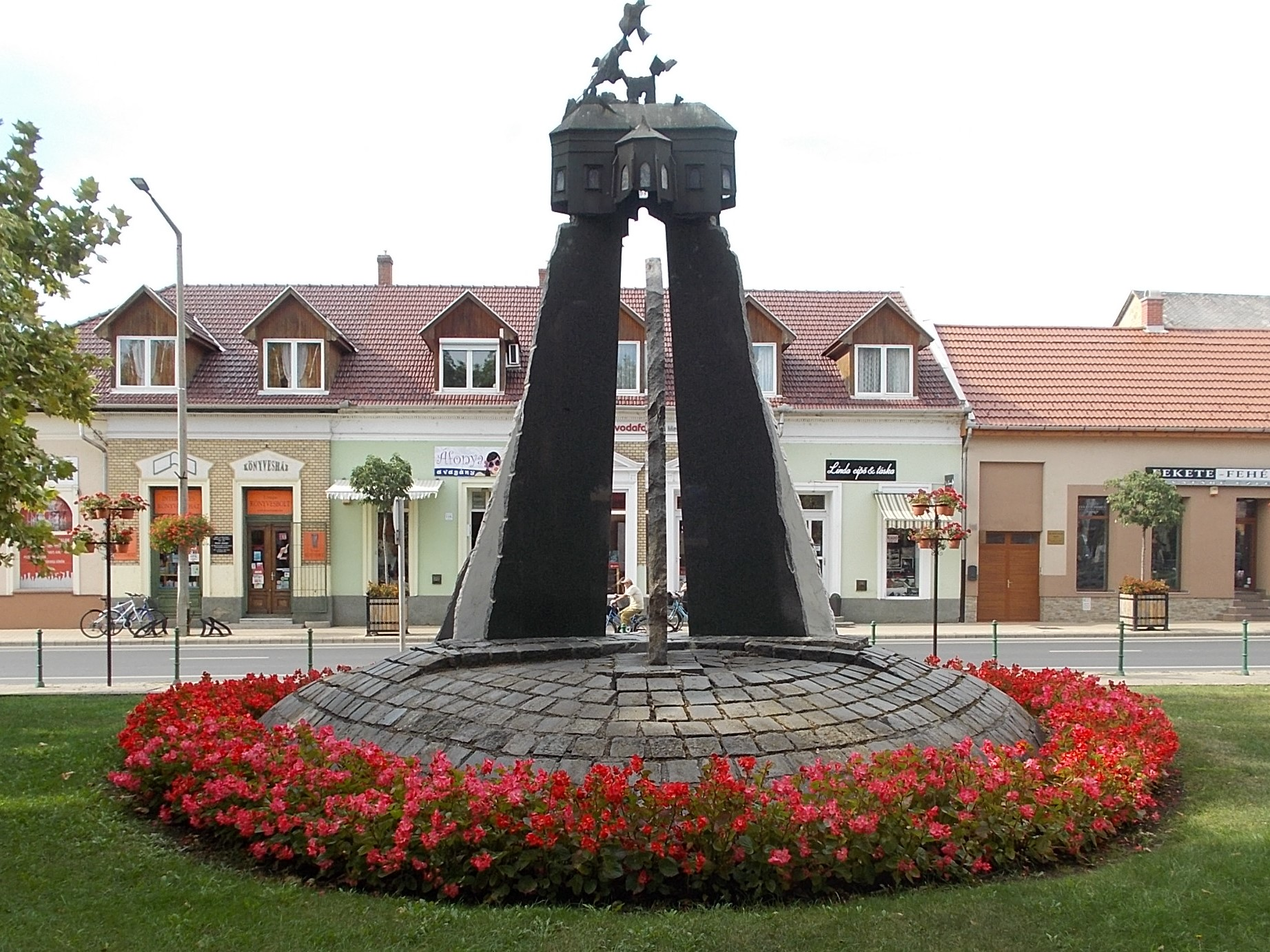
Memorial of the Hungarian Revolution of 1956

== Notable people ==
- Csézy (born 1979), singer
- Funktasztikus, rapper
- József Jacsó (born 1962), weightlifter
- Szabolcs Zubai (born 1984), handballer
