= Beehive stone =

Rock formation in Hungary

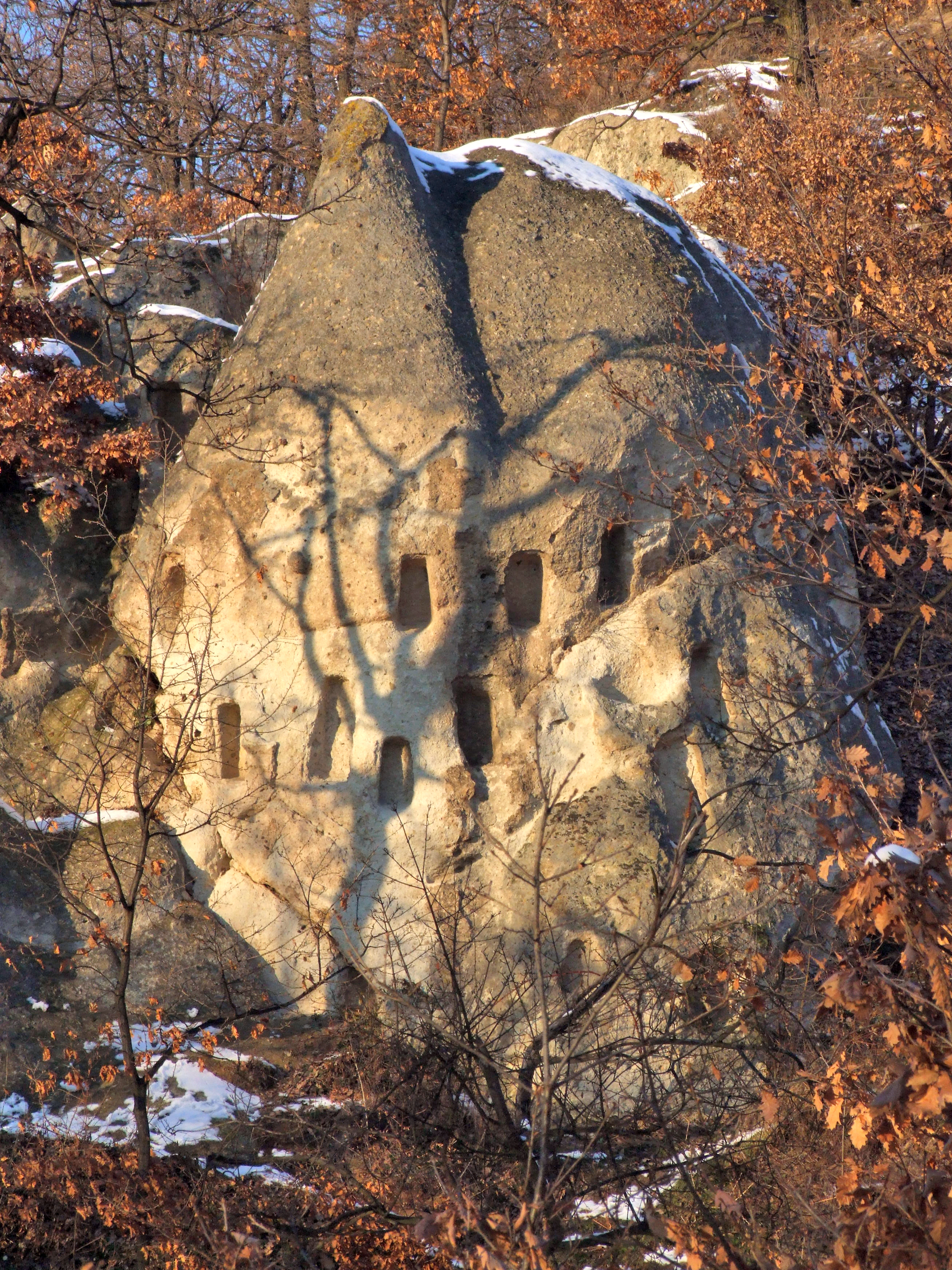
A beehive rock near Szomolya: Királyszéke (King's seat)

Beehive stones or beehive rocks of Hungary are rock formations, often naturally conical towers, with niches or cavities carved into their sides. A limited number of rocks with niches can be found even close to Budapest, in the area of the Pilis mountains and the Budai-hegység hills, especially on its Tétényi-fennsík plateau. However, the city most densely surrounded by such formations is Eger, in the Bükkalja area (which lies between the valley of the Tarna stream and the valleys of the Hejő and Szinva streams).

== Nature conservation, protected heritage ==
One of the location sites near Szomolya was declared as a national protected area in 1961, named Nature Conservation Area of Beehive Stones at Szomolya (Szomolyai Kaptárkövek Természetvédelmi Terület).

According to the definition in decree 17/2014 of the Minister of Agriculture (on establishing places of nature remembrance and on nature conservation management plans to protect beehive stones), which came into effect on the 4th of November 2014, a "kaptárkő" (beehive stone) is a natural or artificially altered stone formation that has, on its surface, one or more visible carved niches – and similar artefacts, in some cases – with significance in the history of culture, therefore representing value in the conservation of both landscape/nature and cultural heritage. The purpose of declaring the protected status is to preserve the beehive stones, as well as their immediate natural surroundings, for their natural and cultural significance, and facilitating their research and exhibition for purposes of nature conservation.

Some key restrictions relevant to visitors are the following: You must not carve/alter the stones. You must not even climb on them. You are not allowed to put objects onto them. In such areas, technical sports and extreme sports activities are forbidden. If you want to do research activities at beehive stone sites, consult the relevant national park directorate.

Beehive stones and the stone culture of the Bükkalja region were declared as a Hungarian-specific value (so-called "Hungarikum"), due to its unique natural nature – at the meeting of a committee dealing with Hungarian-specific values (Hungarikum Bizottság), on the 17th of June 2016.

== Origin ==
The Bükkalja is predominantly made up of volcanic tuffs, created by intense volcanic activities (series of explosive eruptions) in the Miocene. The special, conical rocks and rock groups of the Bükkalja had been prepared from the ground surface composed of mostly ash-flow tuffs and ignimbrites with rhyolitic ingredients, by the key factors of landscape formation in the ice-age, namely: downcutting and lateral erosion, attrition, weathering, rinsing effects of wind and precipitation, and frost erosion. These rocks were shaped further artificially. Thus, beehive rocks are valuable in both natural and cultural history aspects.

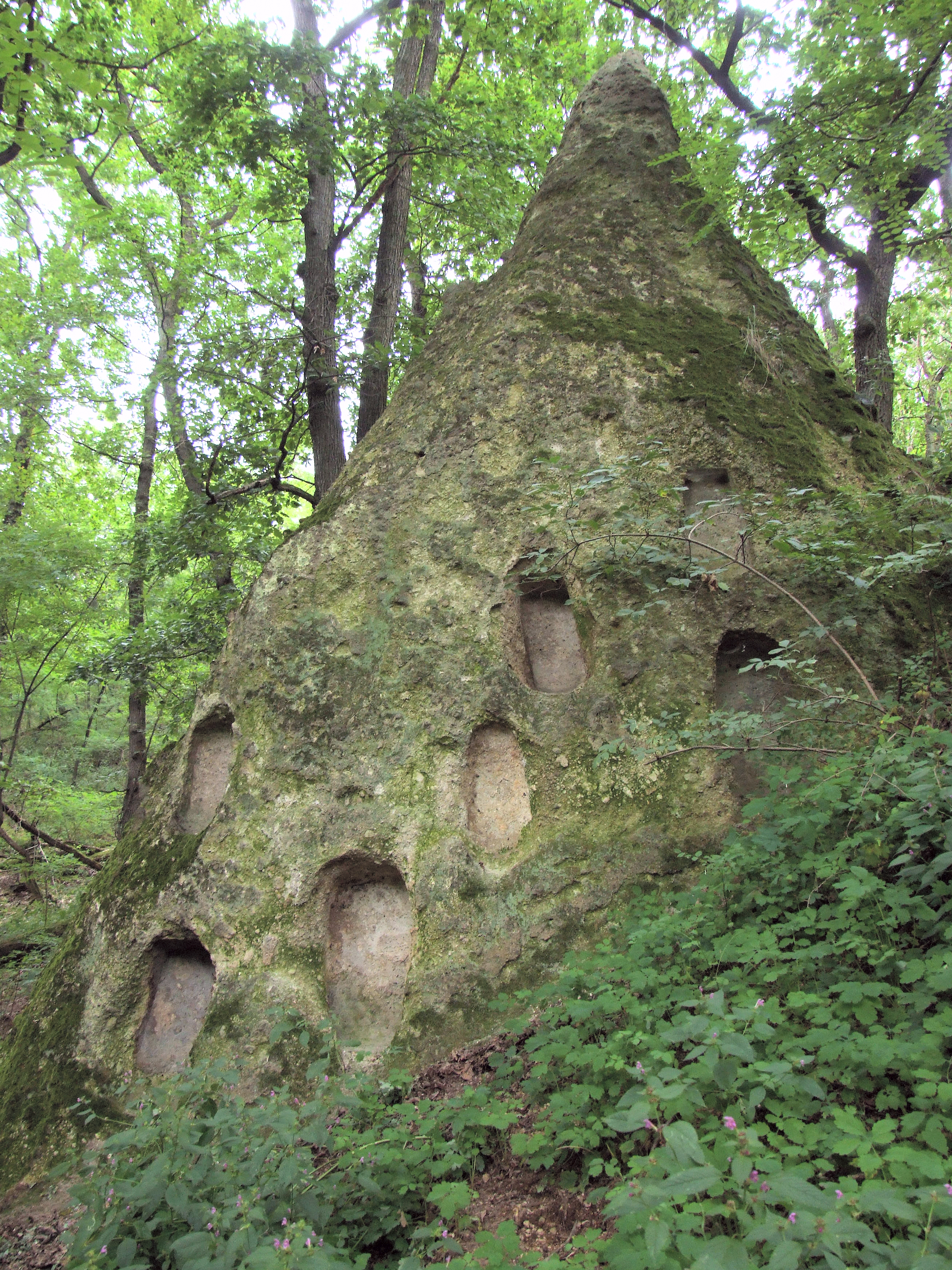
Furgál-völgy [Holed valley] near Cserépváralja

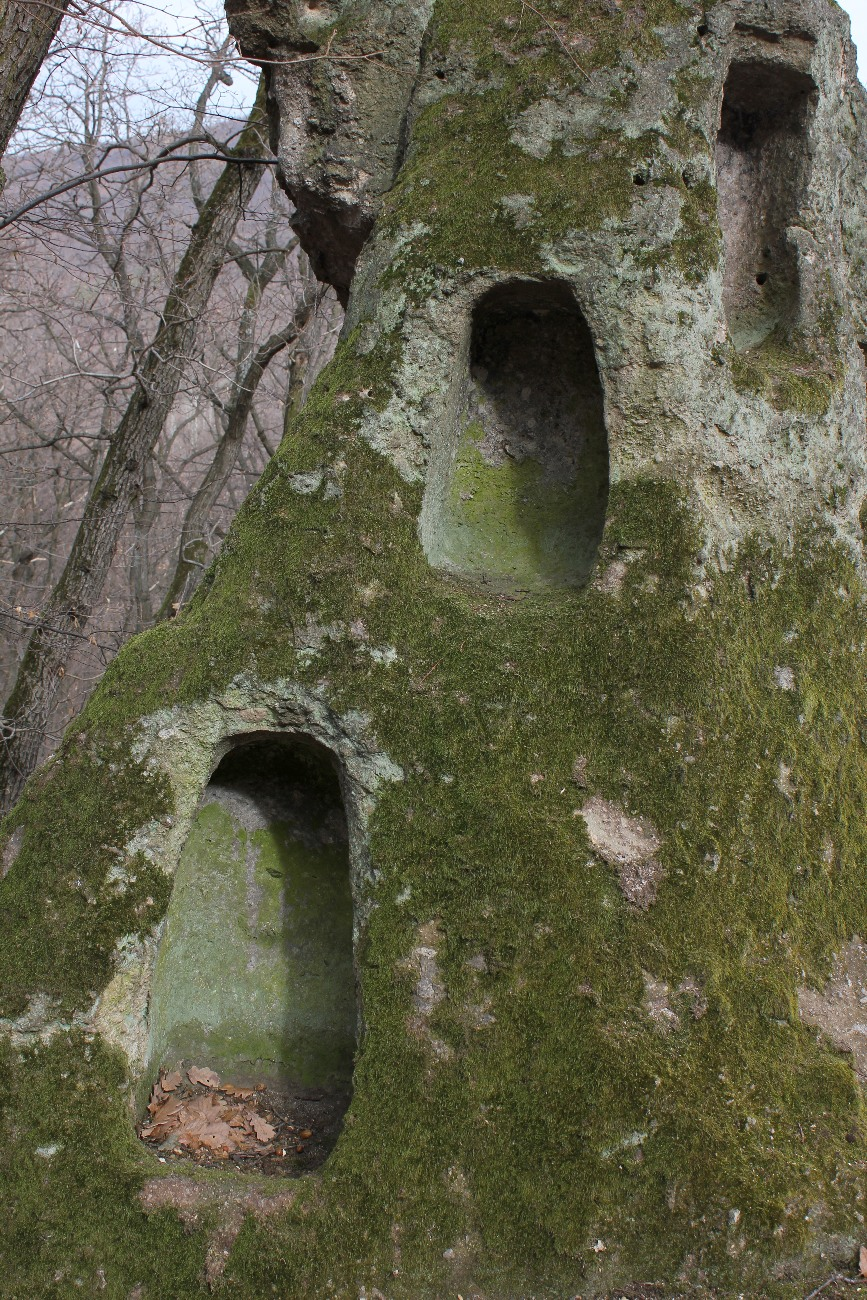
Niches 7, 6, 5 on the Nagy-Bábaszék [Great Midwife-seat], Cserépváralja

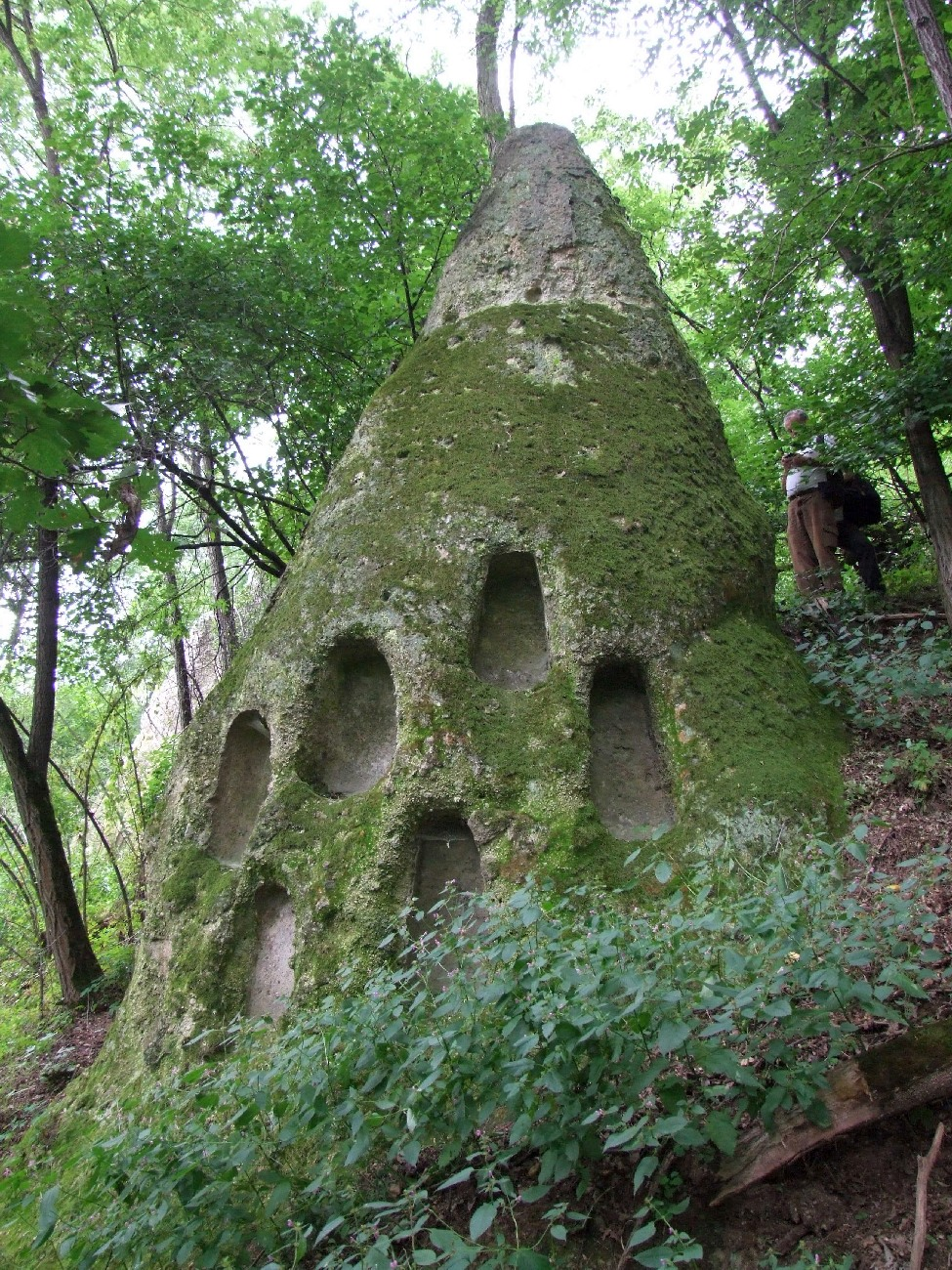
Cone 1, Furgál-völgy [Holed valley], Cserépváralja

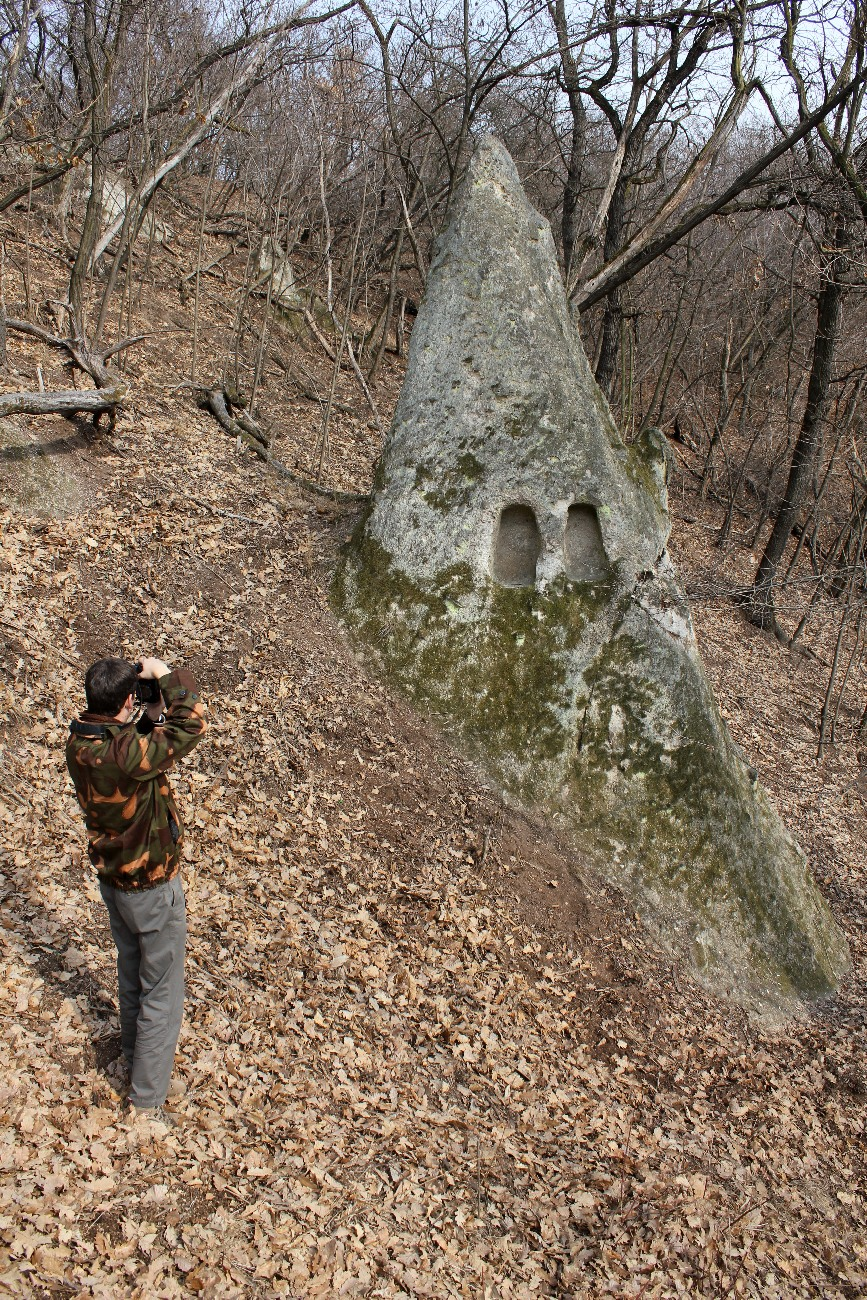
Cone 2, Csordás-völgy [Cowherd valley], Cserépváralja

== Naming ==
The rocks with niches were first called beehive stones (singular: "kaptárkő", plural: "kaptárkövek") by residents of Szomolya, maybe after the meadow adjacent to a group of rocks, where beehives could be stored (Kaptár-rét = Beehive meadow). Near the city of Eger, such rocks were called stones with dummy windows (vakablakos kövek). Some other names known from elsewhere: stones with churns (köpüskövek), idol stones (bálványkövek), mitre (püspöksüveg). Names of some specific rocks are also informative: Ördögtorony [Devil-tower], Ördög-kő [Devil stone], Bábaszék [Midwife-seat], Nyerges [Saddled], Királyszéke [King's seat], Kősárkány [Stone Dragon]. The most consistently applied wording by the first known thorough researcher and connoisseur of rocks with niches (Gyula Bartalos, 1839–1923) was memorial rock or memorial stone (emlékszikla or emlékkő), but he used other names as well: rock pyramid (sziklalobor), carved group of rocks (faragott sziklacsoport), memorial rock with dummy windows (vakablakos emlékszikla), megalith stones (megalit kövek) and stone with churns (köpüskő). Later, largely due to the research and studies by Andor Saád, beehive stone (kaptárkő) had become the most widespread and common term. This naming was applied in later studies by researchers working on resolving the mystery of such rocks: Ferenc Kubinyi, Gyula Bartalos, Gáspár Klein, Andor Saád, Péter Mihály and Csaba Baráz.

The most debated aspects were the origin and intended use of the niches carved into the sides of the rock formations.

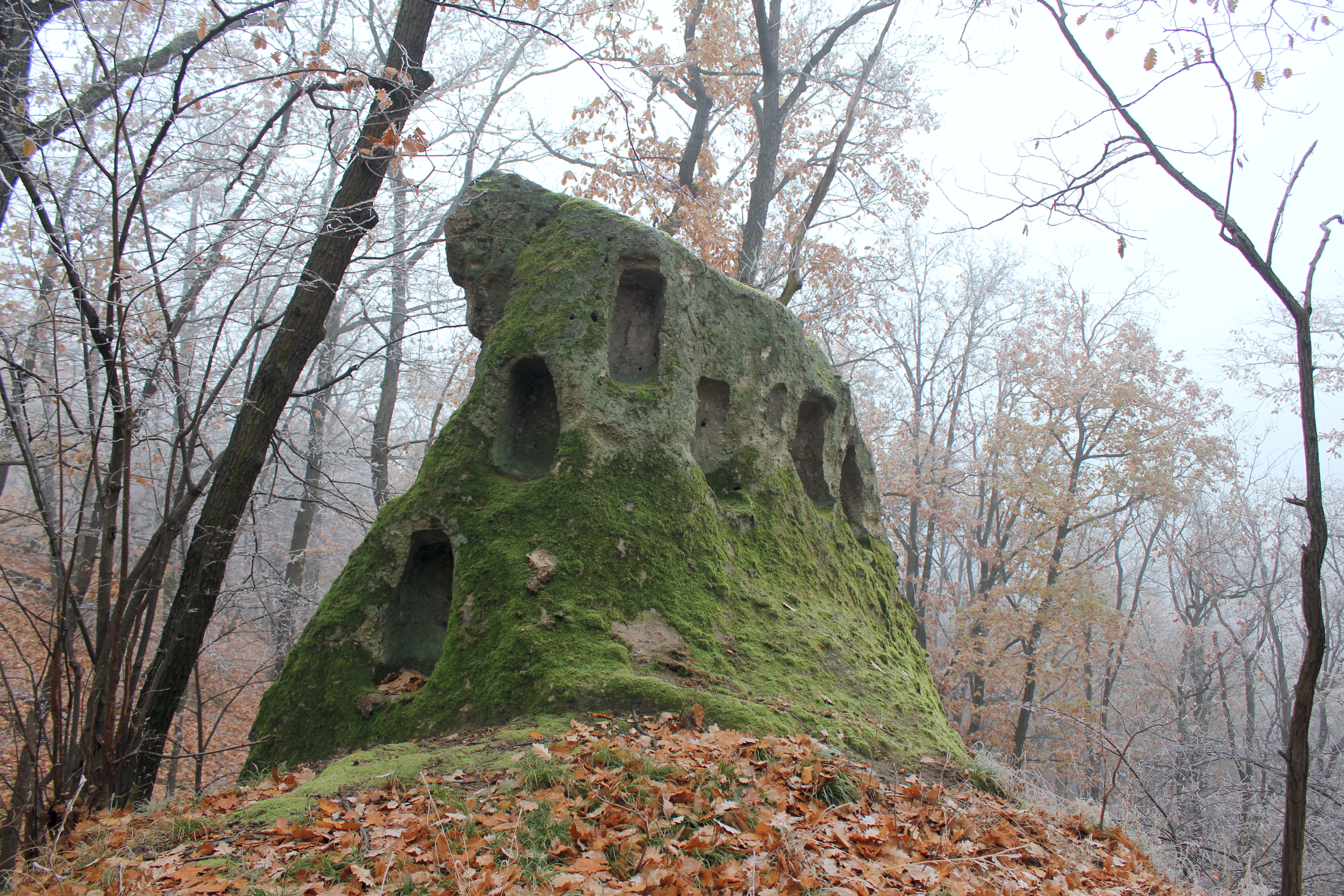
NE side of the Nagy-Bábaszék [Great Midwife-seat] near Cserépváralja

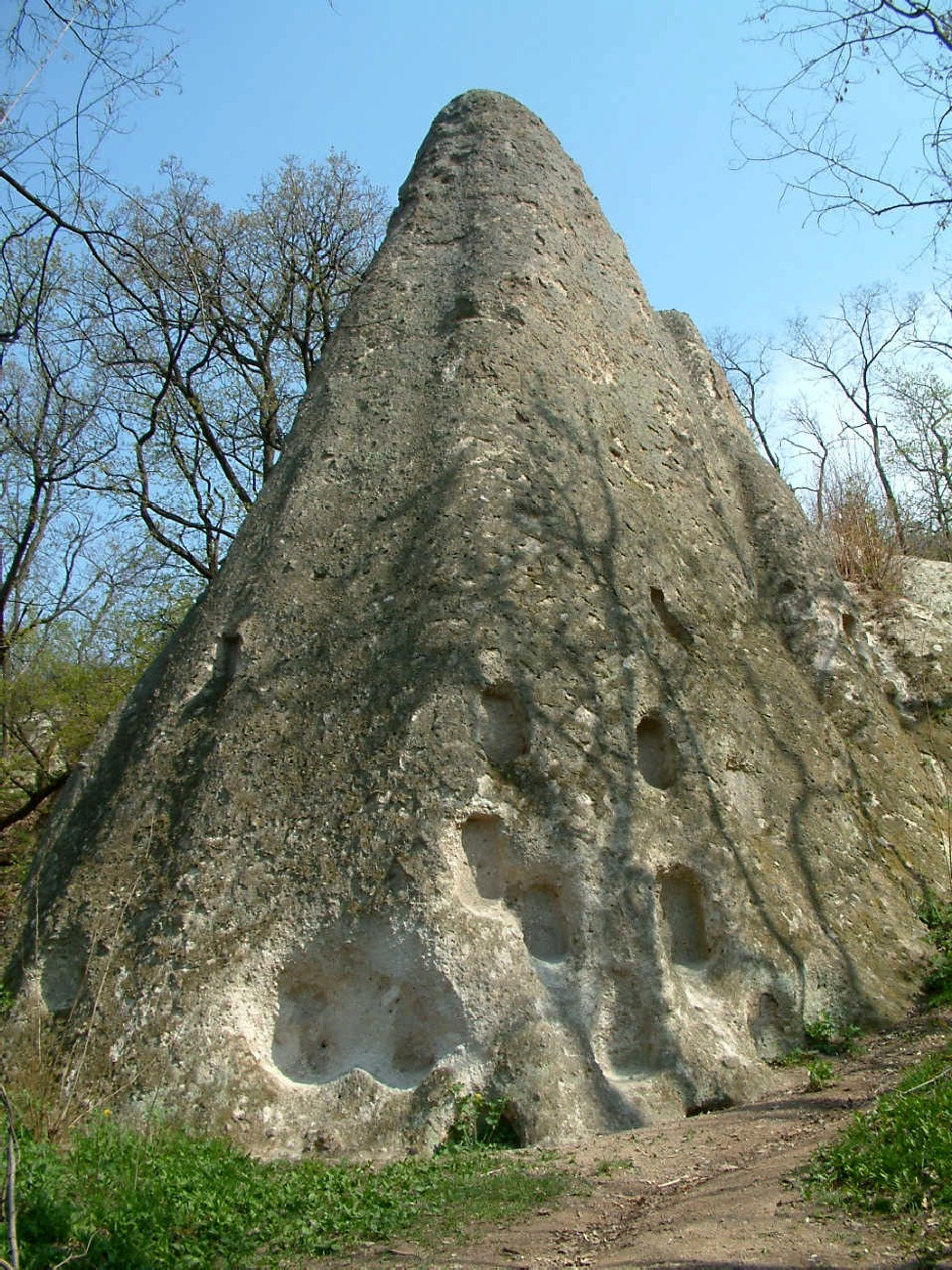
Nagykúp [Large-cone] on the Mangó-tető hill, Cserépváralja

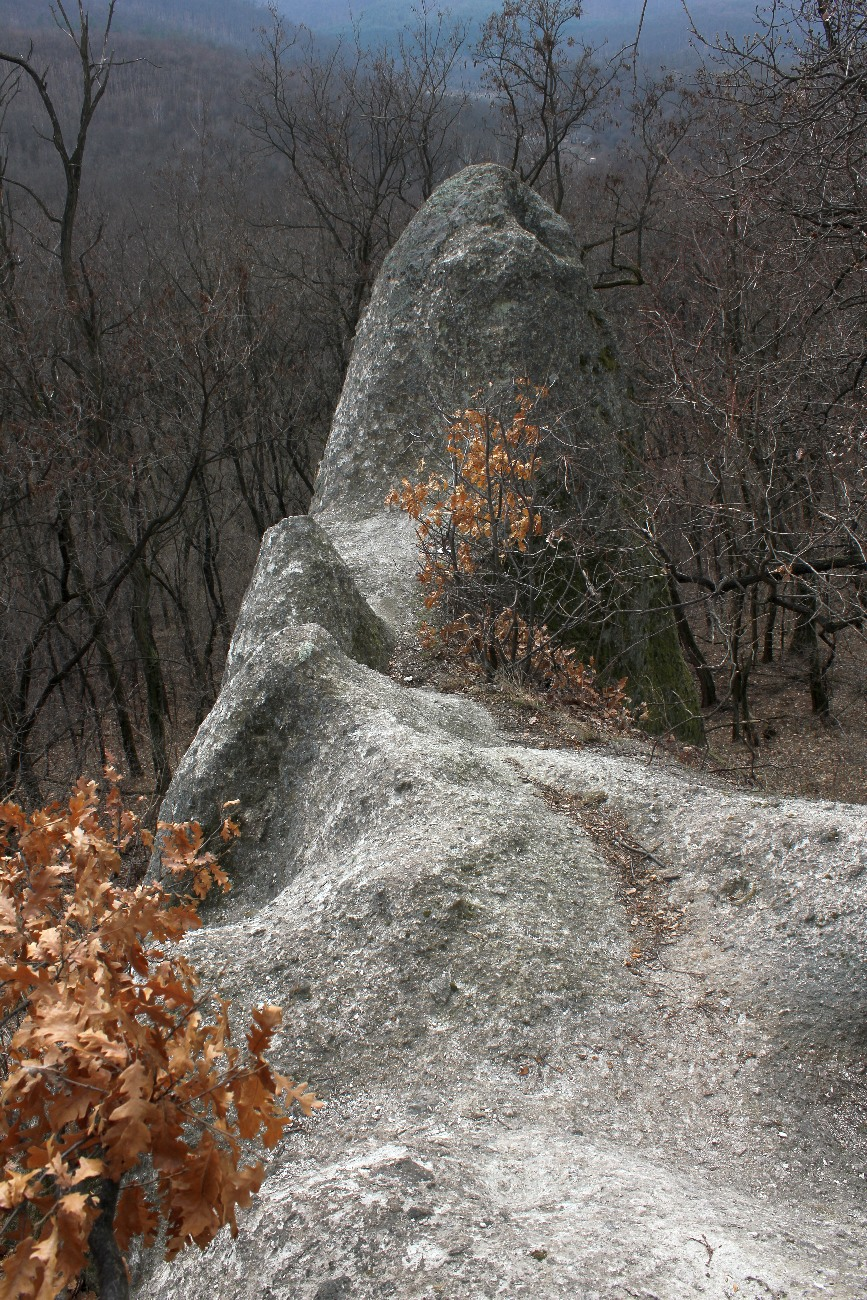
Nagykúp [Large-cone] on the Mangó-tető hill, Cserépváralja

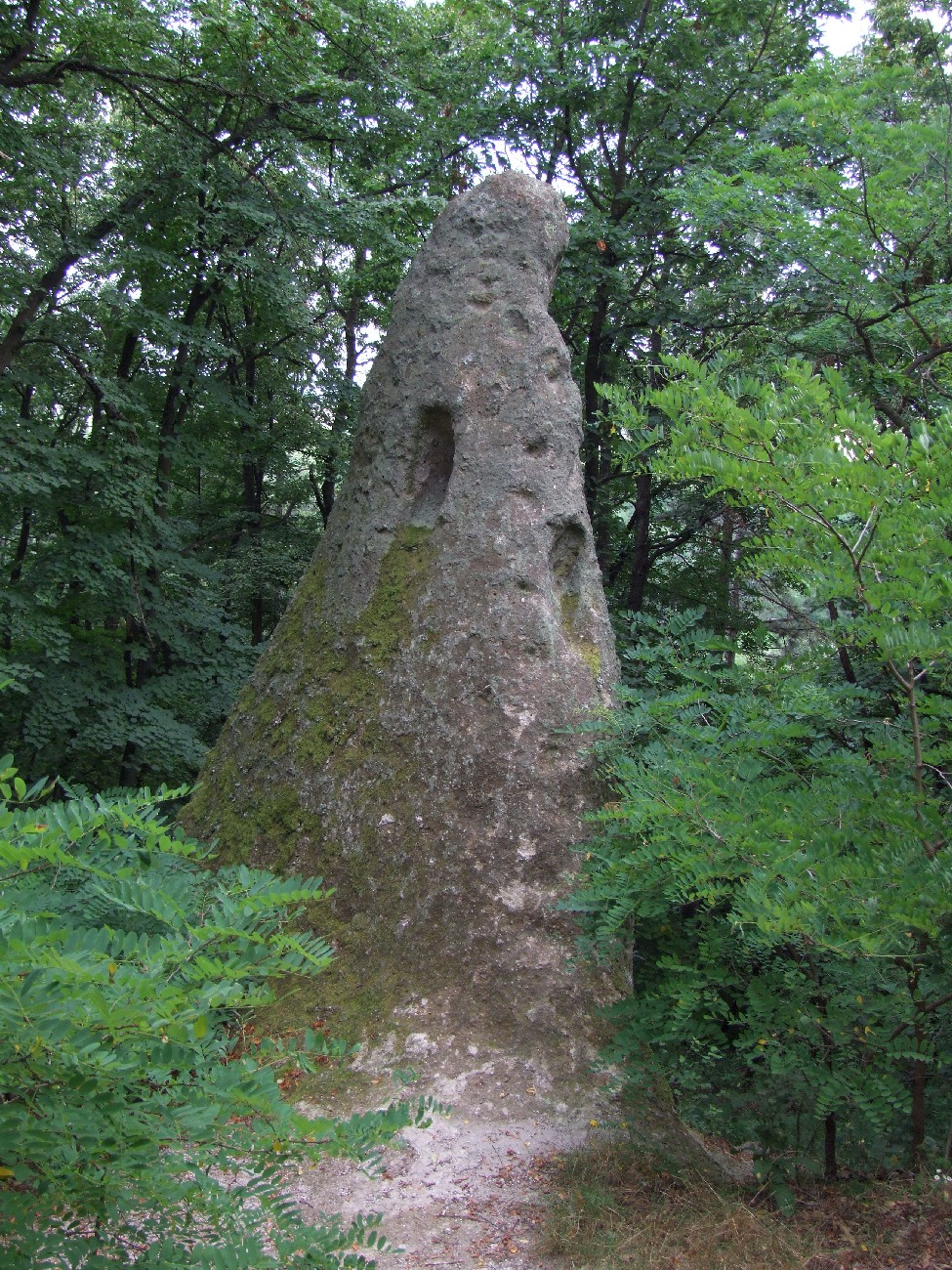
Ördögtorony [Devil-tower] on the Mész-hegy hill, Cserépfalu

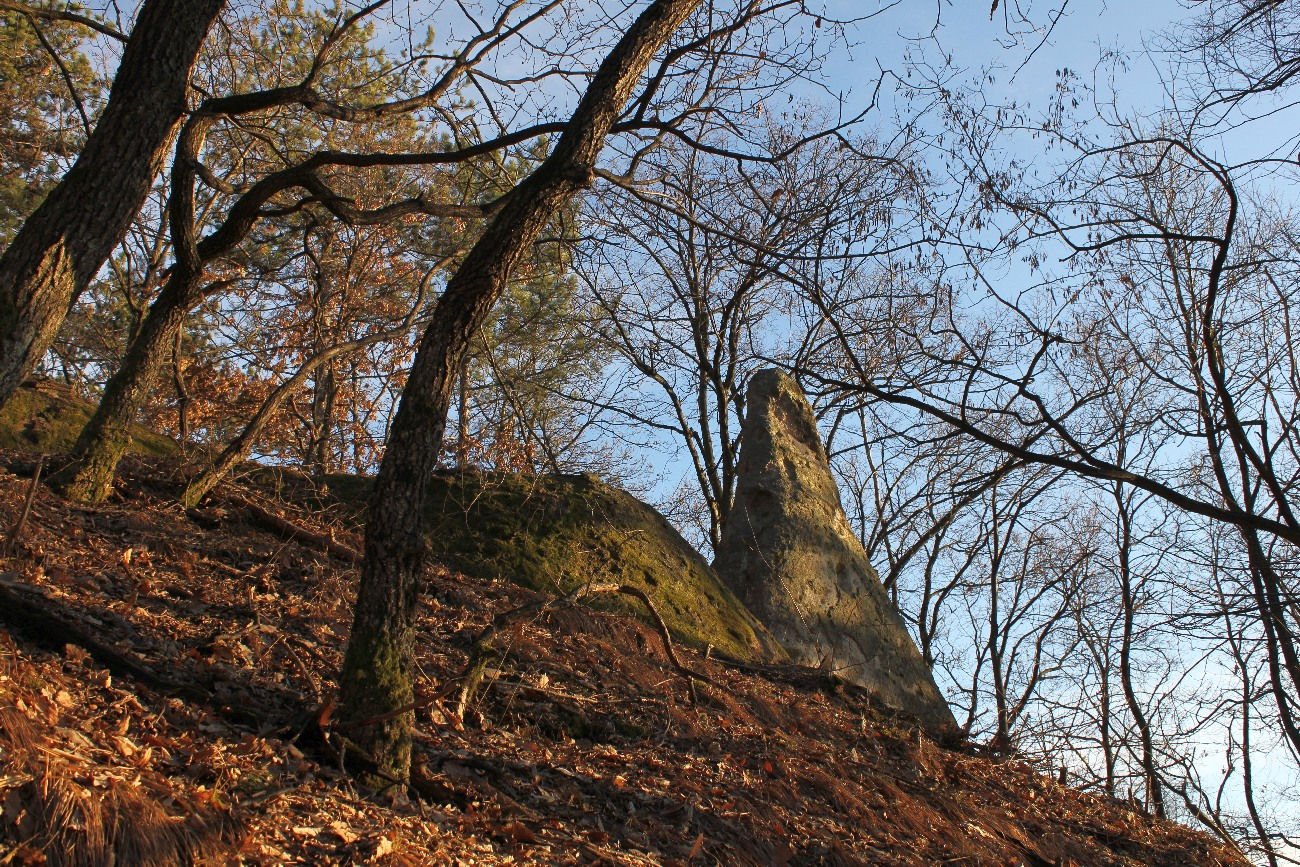
Ördögtorony [Devil-tower], Cserépfalu

== Niches ==
On average, niches are 60-cm high, 30-cm wide and 25 to 30-cm deep. In well-preserved niches, the recessed rims along the edges (some with holes on the sides) are still observable. These may be signs of niche covers mounted with pegs or wedges hammered into the holes. Niches with still visible rim marks were arranged quite unevenly on the rock sides. The exceptional diversity of niche shapes required custom cover sizes and shapes for each niche. Based on certain considerations, the rims could even have decorative or informative purpose.

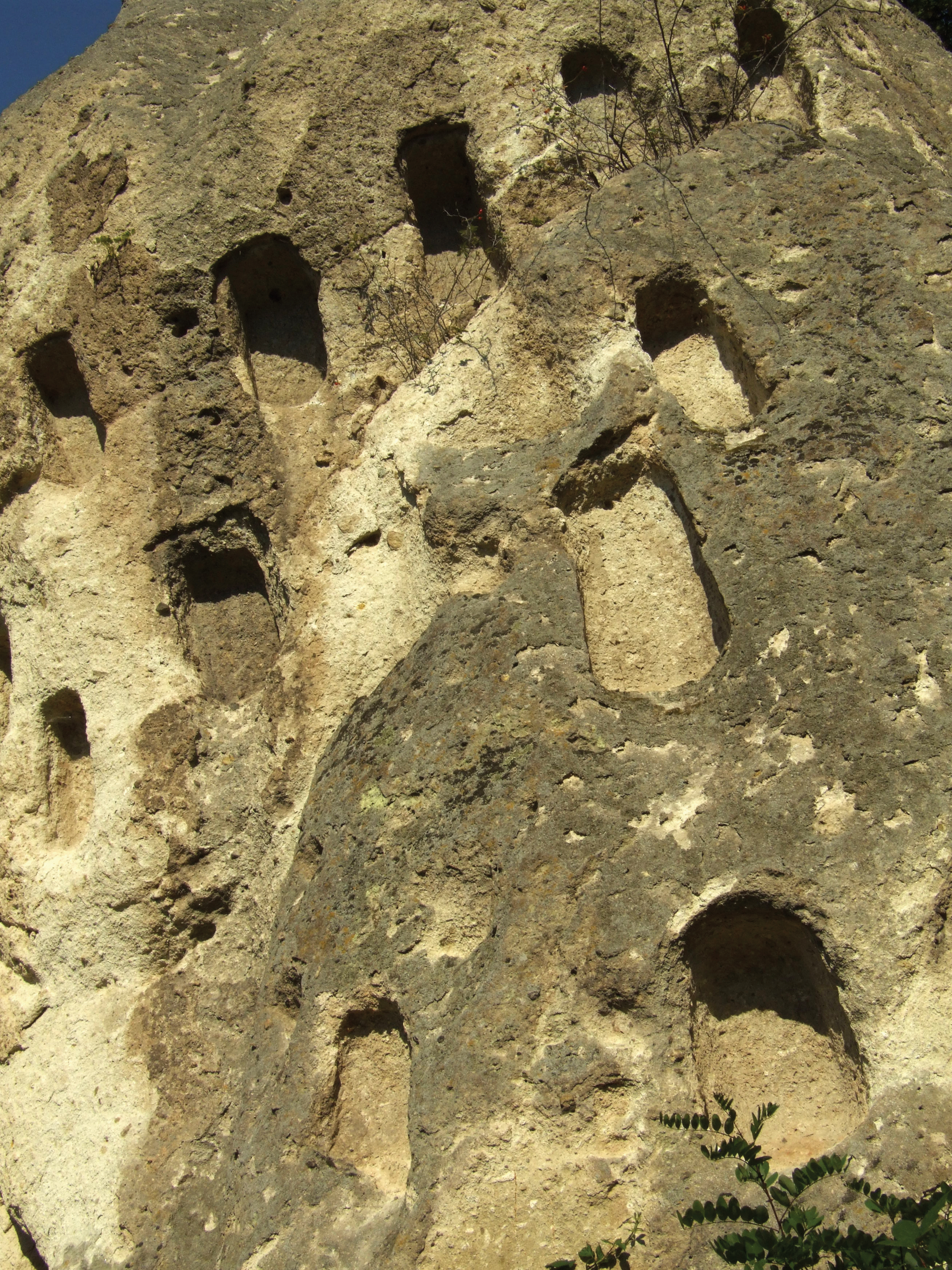
Rock side with niches

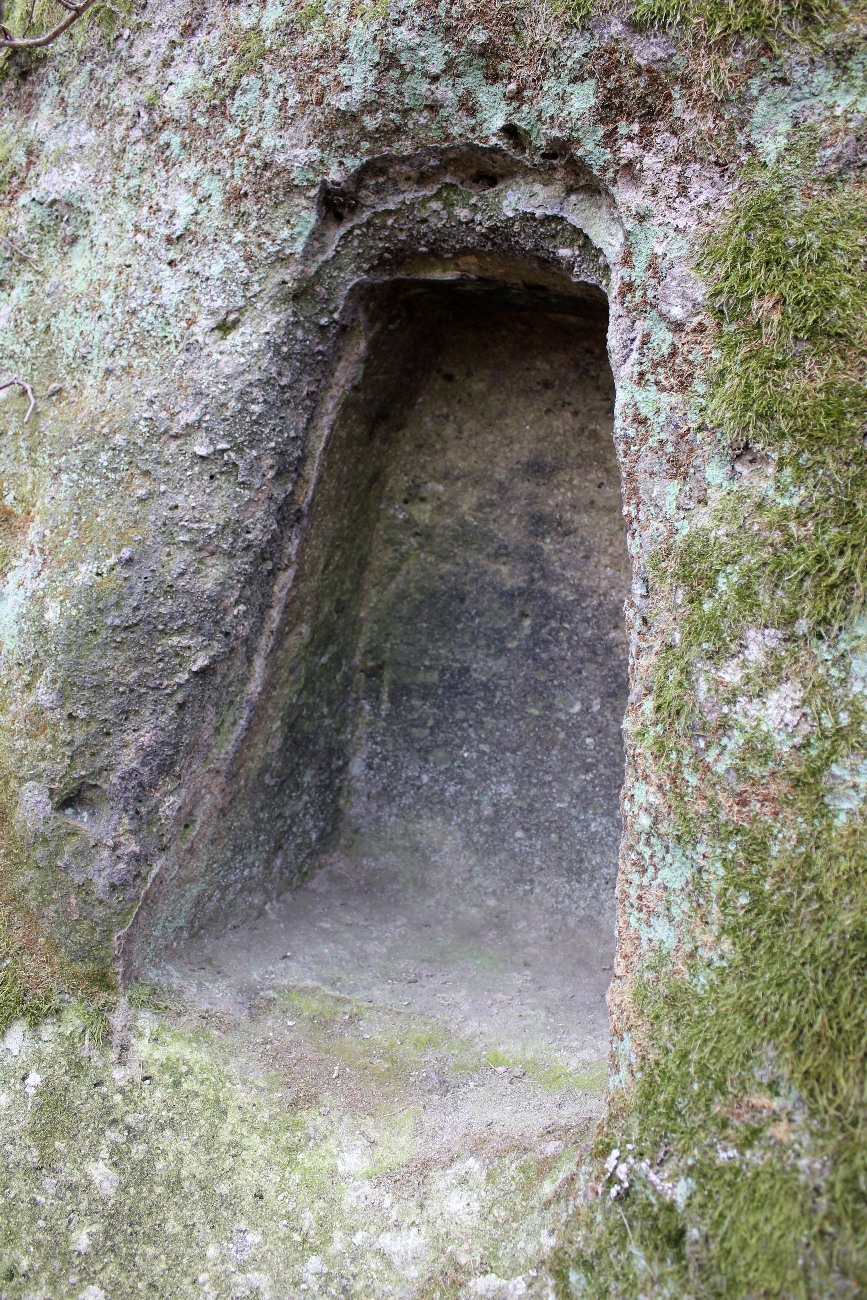
Niche 1, Setét-völgy [Dark valley], Cserépváralja

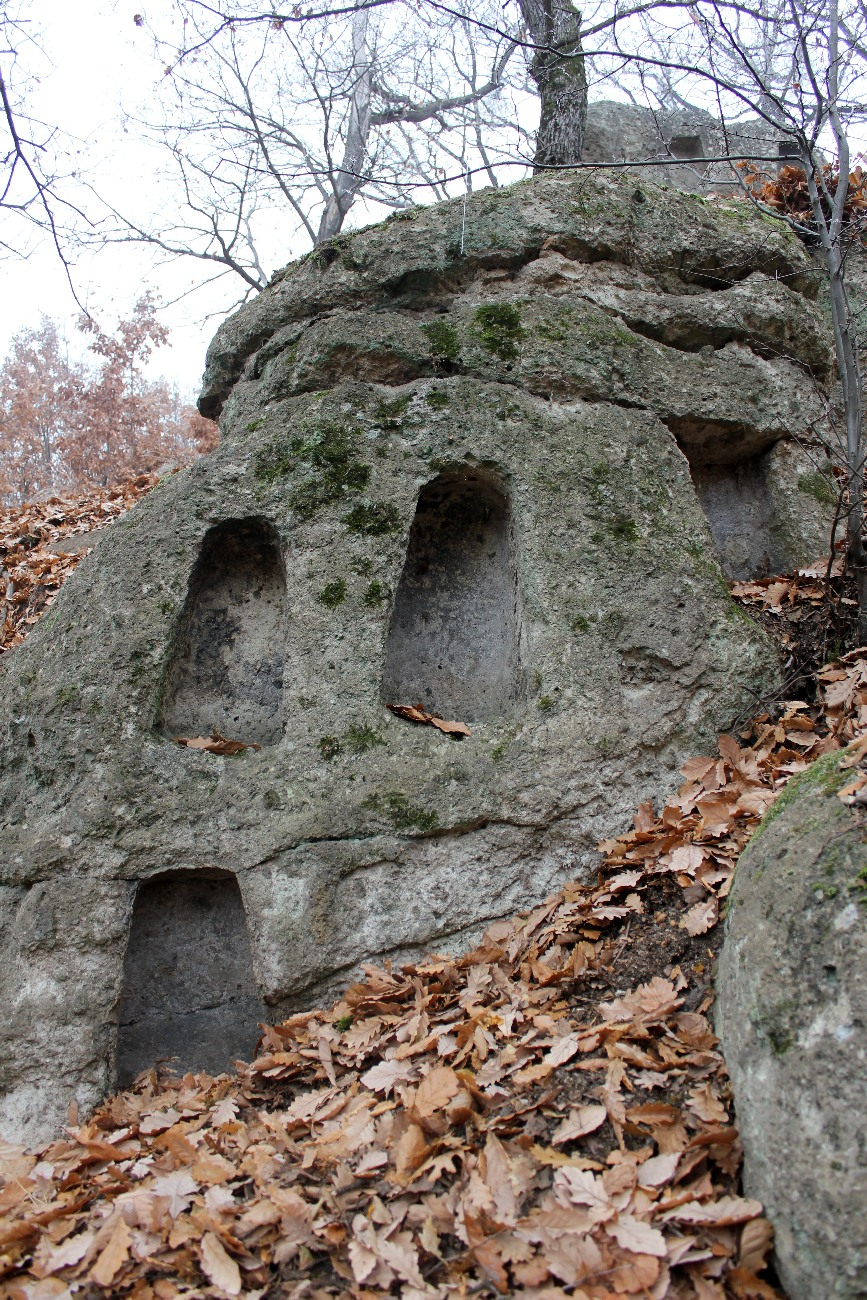
Rock 1, Köves-lápa [Stony valley], Cserépváralja

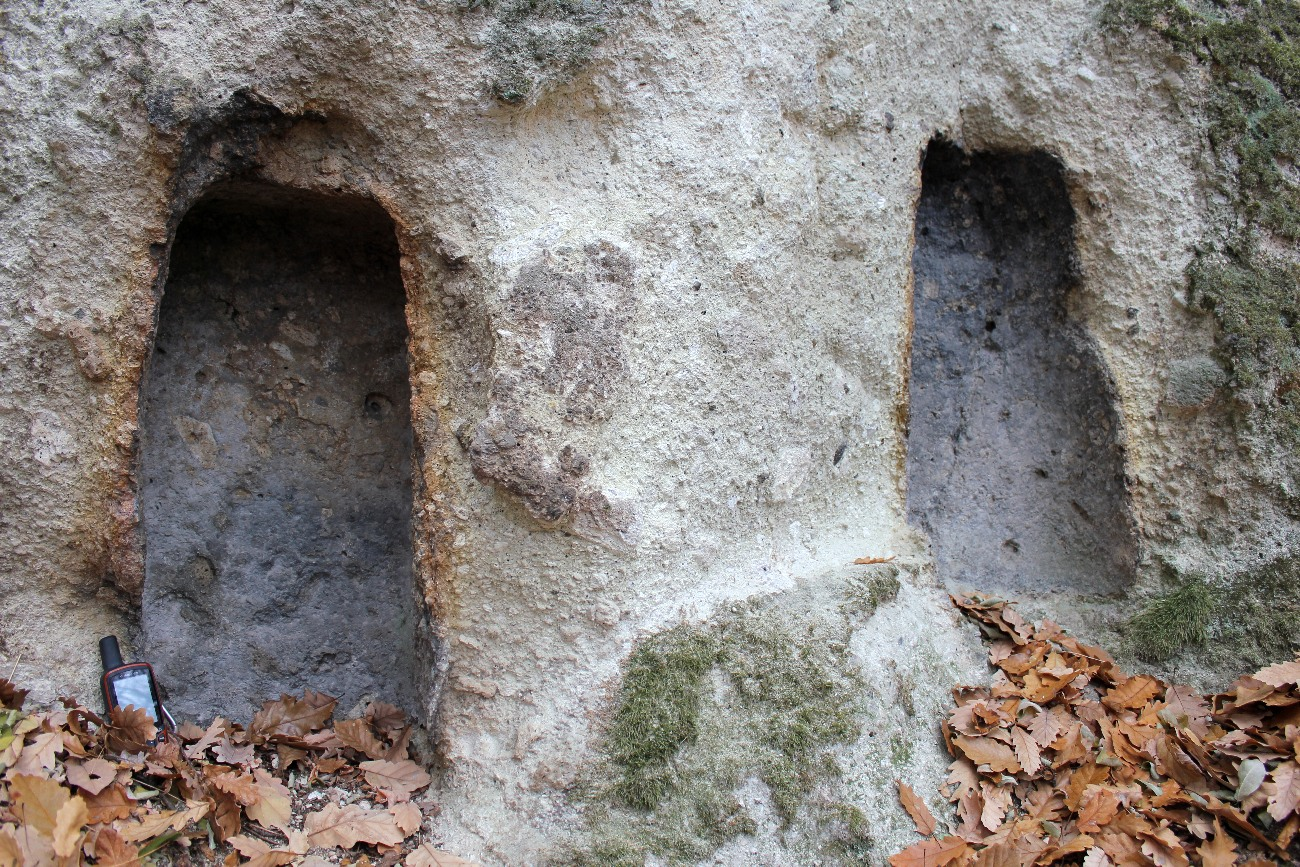
Cone 4, Furgál-völgy [Holed valley], Cserépváralja

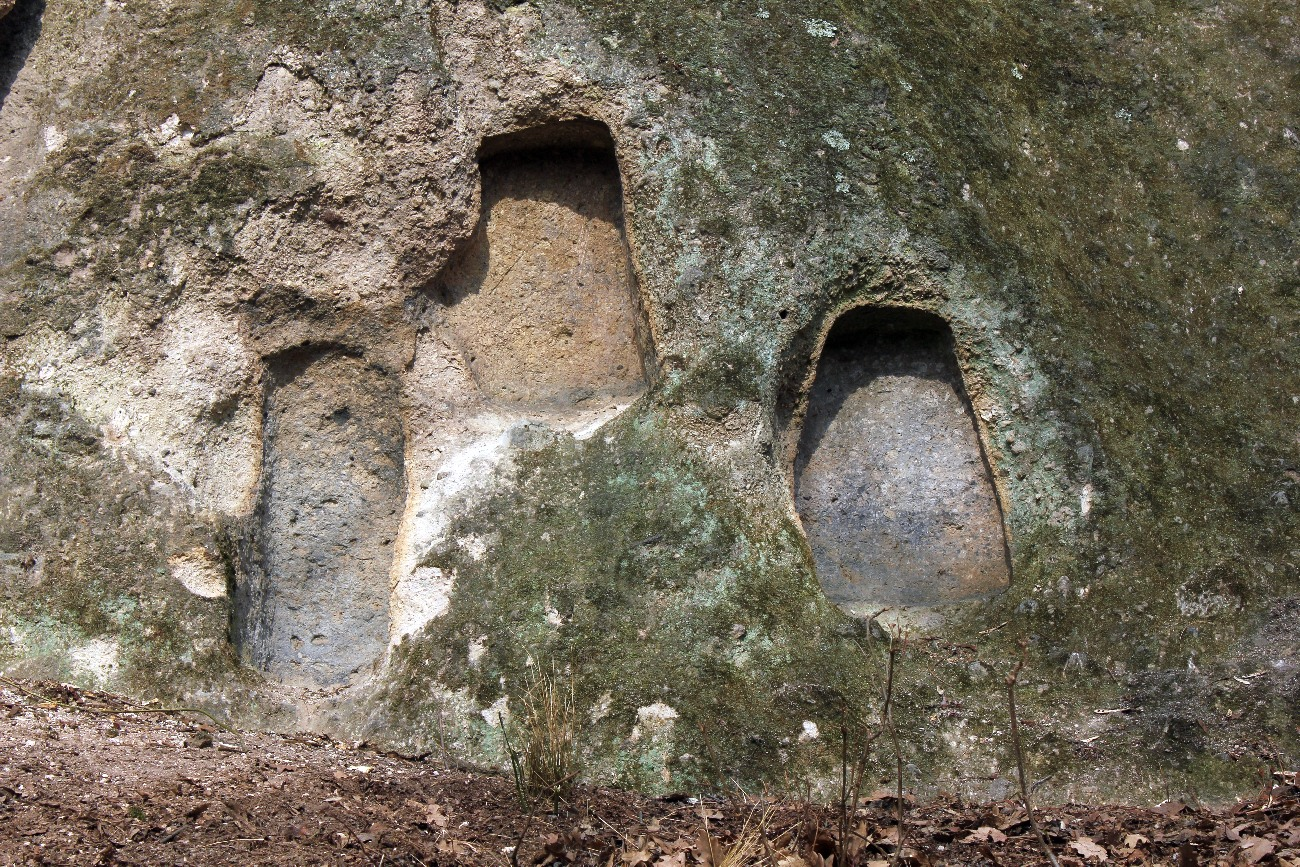
Niches 5-6-7 on cone 1, Csordás-völgy [Cowherd valley], Cserépváralja

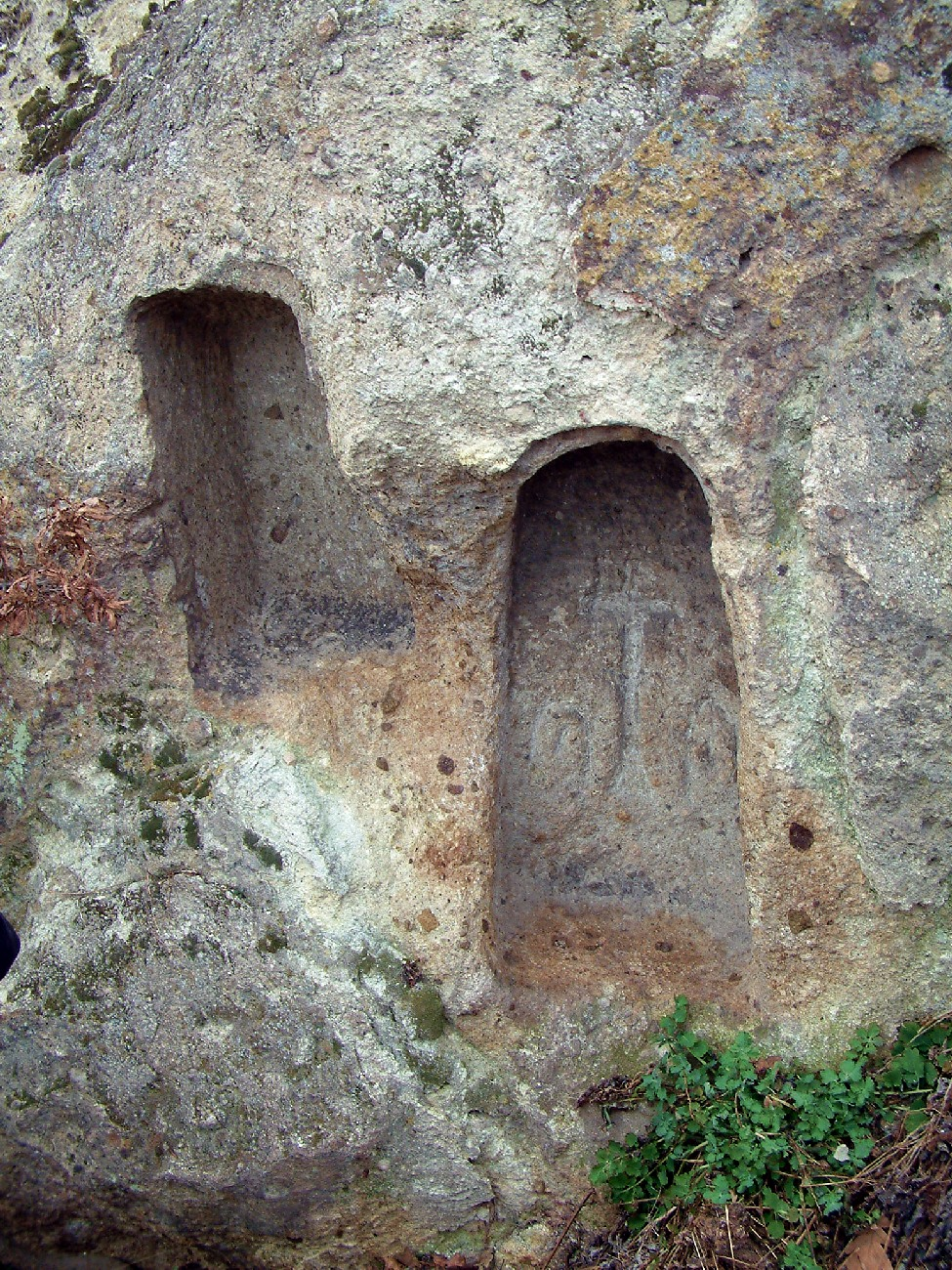
Niches 39 and 38 on rock 4, Kaptár-rét [Beehive meadow], Szomolya

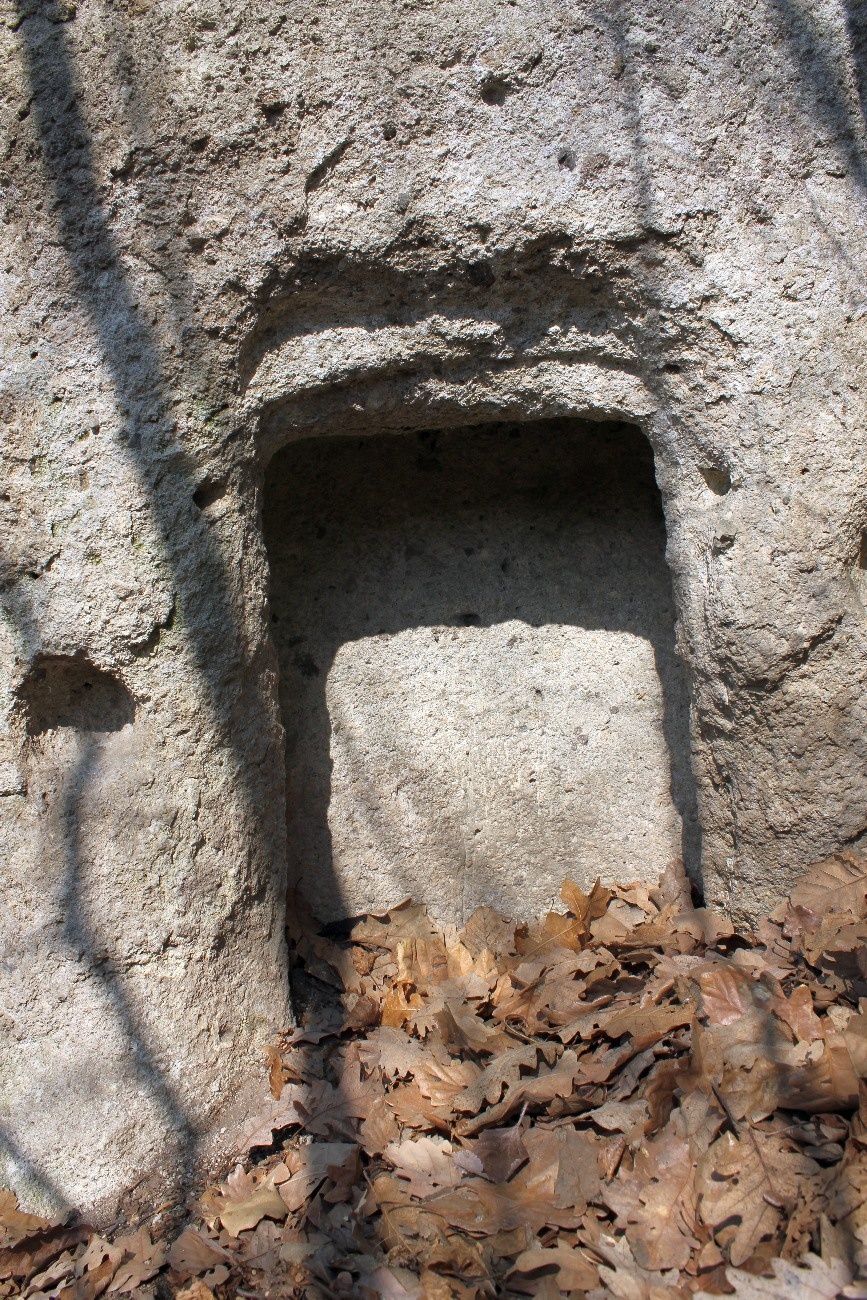
Niche 5 on rock 1, Cakó-tető hill, Eger

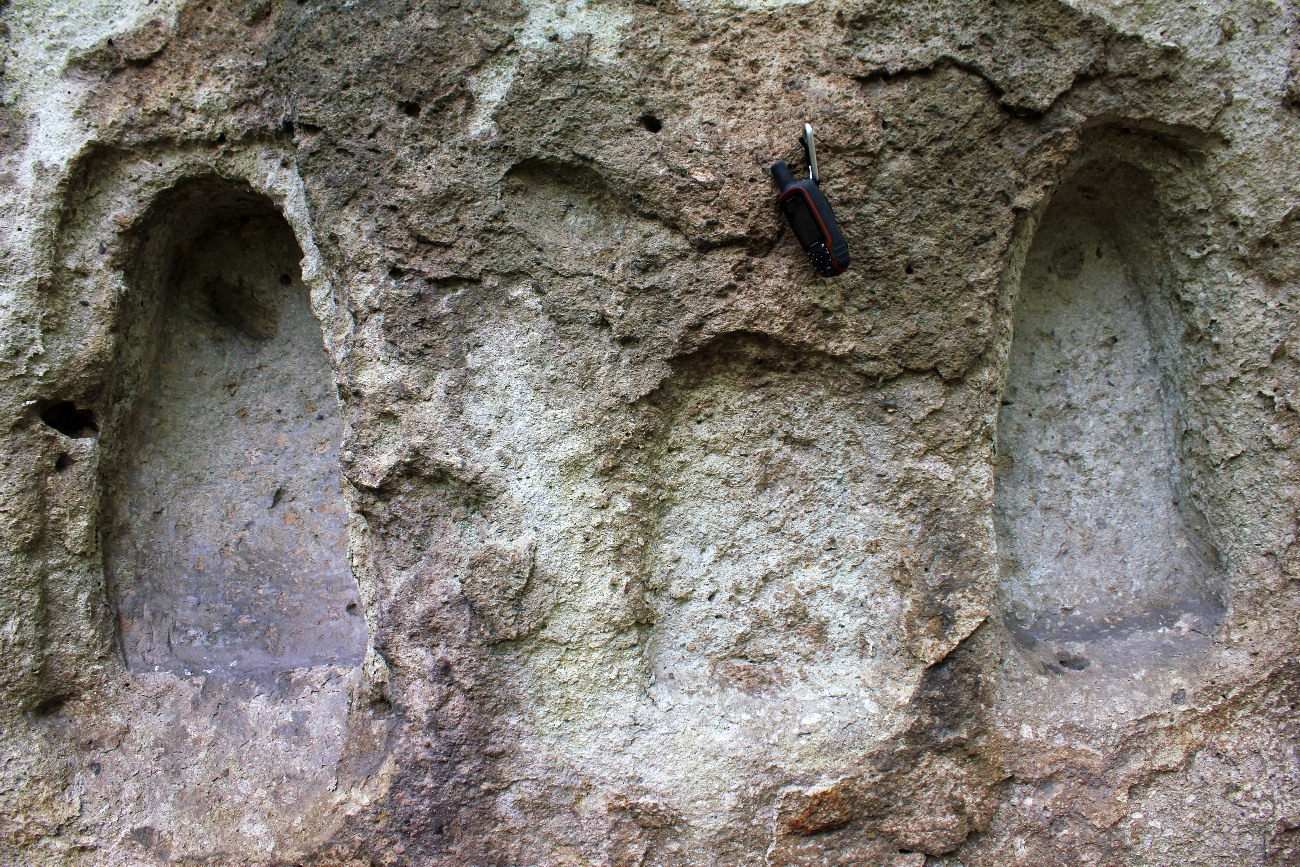
Niches 7–6–5, Nyerges [Saddled] west slope, Eger

== Location sites ==
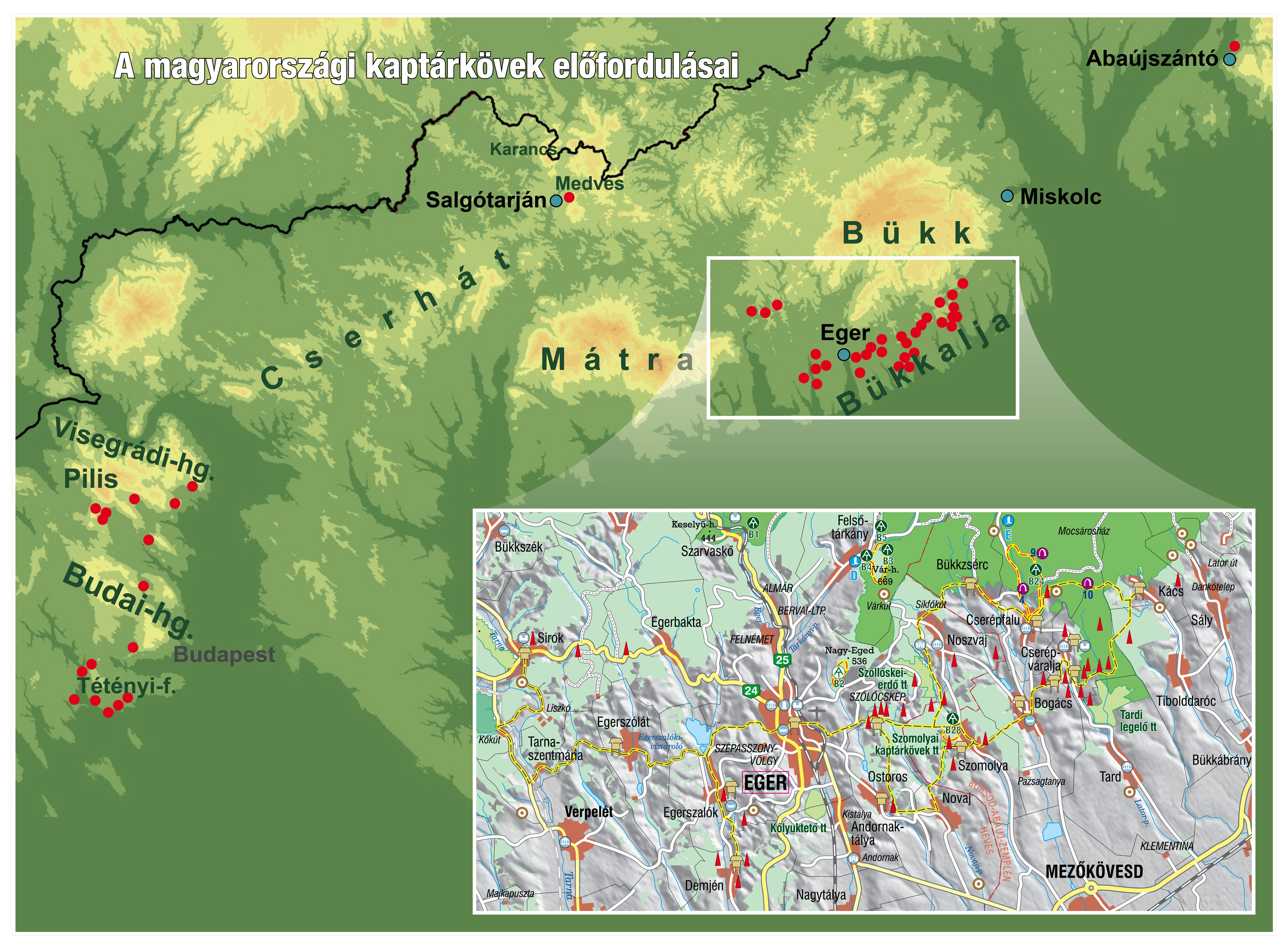
Location sites of beehive rocks in Hungary

The most typical ones can be found in the area surrounding Eger (Nyerges-hegy, Mész-tető, Cakó-tető), near Szomolya (Vén-hegy, Kaptár-rét) and near Cserépváralja (Nagykúp on the Mangó-tető, Furgál-völgy, Csordás-völgy). You can find such rocks also in the areas surrounding Sirok, Egerbakta, Egerszalók, Ostoros, Noszvaj, Bogács, Cserépfalu, Tibolddaróc and Kács. In the Bükkalja area altogether, 479 niches on 82 beehive rocks at 41 sites are known. These are listed (with details) in the table, and described in the Beehive rock registry (for the Bükkalja area) section of the Hungarian article.

A smaller number of beehive rocks can be found in Pest county – on the Tétényi-fennsík plateau, on the Budai-hegység hills, in the Pilis mountains and in the Visegrádi-hegység mountains. In this area, 86 niches on 31 rock formations at 17 sites are known.

Apart from the two collective areas above, some separate location sites are known as well. The easternmost known beehive rock is the Ördög-szikla [Devil rock] (B.1; 5 niches) in the Hömpörgő-völgy valley at Abaújszántó. There is a location site also on the Medves-fennsík plateau, on the Pécs-kő hill (4 niches) near Salgótarján. 2 niches on the Haraszt-hegy hill at Csákvár became known in 2007. In the area of Balaton-felvidék (the northern vicinity of lake Balaton), two distinct location sites are known: one on the Óvár-hegy hill of Tihany (Barátlakások [Monk habitats], 1 niche) and one on the Part-fő of Balatonkenese (Tatárlik [Tatar hole], 1 niche).

In Hungary altogether, up till 2013, 564 niches on 104 rock formations at 56 sites had been surveyed topographically. [Only those rocks with niches are registered as beehive rocks for which the topographic survey of the niches has been carried out accordingly to the classification system and methodology developed by Péter Mihály. Therefore, from the separate location sites, only the Ördög-szikla [Devil rock] (B.1) of the Hömpörgő-völgy valley near Abaújszántó is included.]

== List of beehive rock location sites in the Bükkalja area ==
ID	Name of rock (group) or location	Name of human settlement	Number of rocks with niches	Number of niches
B2	Kecske-kő [Goat stone]	Kács	1	3
B3	Ablakoskő-völgy [Valley of stone with windows], Karud alja és árnyék [shadowy bottom of the Karud hill]	Tibolddaróc	1	6
B4a	Setét-völgy [Dark valley]	Cserépváralja	1	5
B4b	Koldustaszító [Beggar toppler]	Cserépváralja	1	6
B4c	Köves-lápa [Stony valley], SW slope of the Karud hill	Cserépváralja	2	11
B4d	Nagy-Bábaszék [Great Midwife-seat] - Bábaszék [Midwife-seat]	Cserépváralja	1	12
B4e	Nagy-Bábaszék [Great Midwife-seat] - Szőlő-tető [Grape hill]	Cserépváralja	1	1
B4f	Nagy-Bábaszék [Great Midwife-seat] - Nyúl-völgy-oldal [side of Hare valley]	Cserépváralja	1	1
B4g	Furgál-völgy [Holed valley]	Cserépváralja	5	32
B4h	Csordás-völgy [Cowherd valley]	Cserépváralja	5	31
B4i	Mangó-tető hill - Nagykúp [Large-cone], Kiskúp [Small-cone]	Cserépváralja	2	30
B4j	Vén-hegy [Age-old hill of Cserépváralja]	Cserépváralja	2	3
B5	Ördögtorony [Devil-tower] - Mész-hegy hill	Cserépfalu	1	3
B6	Hintó-völgy [Carriage valley]	Bogács	1	5
B7a	Vén-hegy [Age-old hill of Szomolya] - Kaptár-rét [Beehive meadow], Kaptár-völgy [Beehive valley]	Szomolya	8	117
B7b	Ispán-berki-tető hill	Szomolya	3	7
B7c	Gyűr-hegy [Creased hill] (rock ruined in the early 21st century)	Szomolya	1	4
B7d	Csobánka	Szomolya	1	4
B8	Pokololdal [Hell-side] - Bábaszék [Midwife-seat]	Tard	1	2
H1a	Farkas-kő [Wolf stone] - Pocem	Noszvaj	1	1
H1b	Dóc [Prop]	Noszvaj	3	6
H1c	Pipis-hegy hill	Noszvaj	1	2
H2a	Cakó-tető hill	Eger	4	36
H2b	Mész-völgyi szikla [rock of the Mész-völgy valley]	Eger	1	6
H2c	Mész-hegy hill, southern group of rocks	Eger	3	22
H2d	Nyerges-hegy [Saddled hill] east slope	Eger	1	7
H2e	Nyerges-hegy [Saddled hill] west slope	Eger	4	20
H2f	Pajdos	Ostoros	2	10
H3a	Betyárbújó [Outlaw-shelter] - Öreg-hegy [Old hill]	Egerszalók	1	1
H3b	Menyecske-hegy [Young-wife hill]	Egerszalók	2	4
H3c	Kőbújó [Stone shelter]	Egerszalók	1	-
H4a	Bányaél [Mine-edge] - Kő-tető hill	Demjén	1	23
H4b-c	Hegyes-kő-tető hill and Eresztvény-völgy valley	Demjén	8	36
H4d	Remete-völgy [Hermit valley]	Demjén	1	6
H5	Szent-völgy [Sacred valley]	Egerbakta	1	3
H6a	Rozsnak-völgy valley	Sirok	1	1
H6b	Törökasztal [Turk table] and Bálványkövek [Idol stones]	Sirok	1	3
H6c	Vár-hegy [Castle hill] of Sirok	Sirok	2	3
H6d	Földkunyhó-tető [Soil-hut hill]	Sirok	1	-
H7a	Vizes-völgy [Wet valley]	Ostoros	1	1
H6b	Tag-gödör swale	Ostoros	2	5
Altogether in the Bükkalja:			82	479

== History of research ==
Regarding the intended use of the "beehive" niches, a number of theories has arisen. The first known thorough researcher of the subject area was Gyula Bartalos, a historian and archaeologist priest from Eger. His theory was that the beehive rocks had been shrines, with ashes of human remains put into the niches. He linked the carving of rock niches to "Hun" Hungarians first, and to Celts and Scythians later. Gáspár Klein, a chief archivist of Borsod county, suggested that the dummy windows could have served as idol niches, and dated them to the age of the so-called Hungarian conquest (9th–10th centuries). Bartalos had already mentioned the currently most accepted opinion (that the niches had been used for beekeeping), with expressing his doubts: "Ordinary people who tend to guess right away call these rocks «beehive rocks»; they think these could have been apiaries of ancient people, as if bees would live in rocks and on shadowy sides". – published in the Archaeologiai Értesítő [Archaeology Newsletter], 1891. The dominant agent of the beekeeping opinion was Andor Saád, a medical doctor from the city of Miskolc. In the early 1960s, he even conducted some archaeological excavations in front of beehive rocks, with archaeologist József Korek, at sites near Cserépváralja and Szomolya. However, their archaeological finds, dated to the 11th–14th centuries, could not justify any of the theories.

== Archaeological excavations ==
The number of archaeological excavations conducted to reveal the secret of beehive rocks is relatively low, and those few did not bring up many finds.

In the early 1960s, the dominant agent of the beekeeping purpose opinion (Andor Saád, a medical doctor from Miskolc) conducted some archaeological excavations in front of beehive rocks, with archaeologist József Korek, at sites near Cserépváralja and Szomolya. In front of the Nagykúp [Large-cone] near Cserépváralja, two pottery fragments with wavy lines (dated to the 11th–12th centuries) and a sword fragment were found. At a higher level, they found a piece of glass and a wrought-iron candle holder. As for the site near Szomolya, in the filling of a human-sized cavity along a natural rock fissure on group (of rocks) number V and in front of that, ceramic fragments dated to the 14th–15th centuries were found. The conclusion (dating the use of the niches) drawn from the poor finds was far-fetched: “... the niches were used in the 11th–15th centuries AD". These finds could relate to the use of the niches during the Árpád-kor period (between the 9th and the 14th centuries) of the Kingdom of Hungary indeed. Regarding the first uses of such niches, these finds may not serve as proof. In the rock surface in front of the tuff cone, channels, multiple small recesses and a larger (60×40-cm wide and 70-cm deep) recess were found. It would be hard to take Korek's opinion: "probably, these could be for water retaining and storage, and could be related to the beekeeping activity".

== Intended use ==
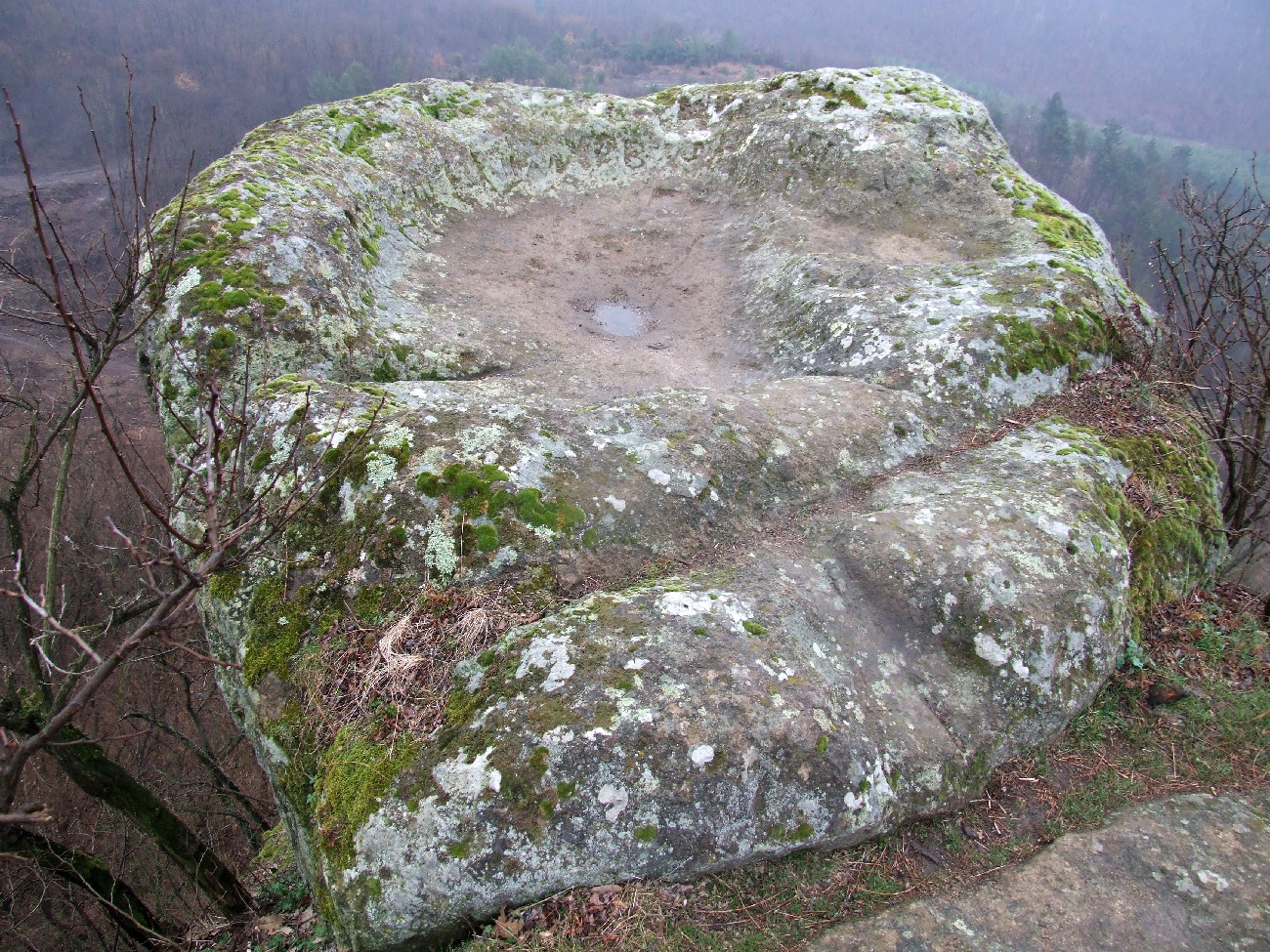
Törökasztal [Turk table], Sirok

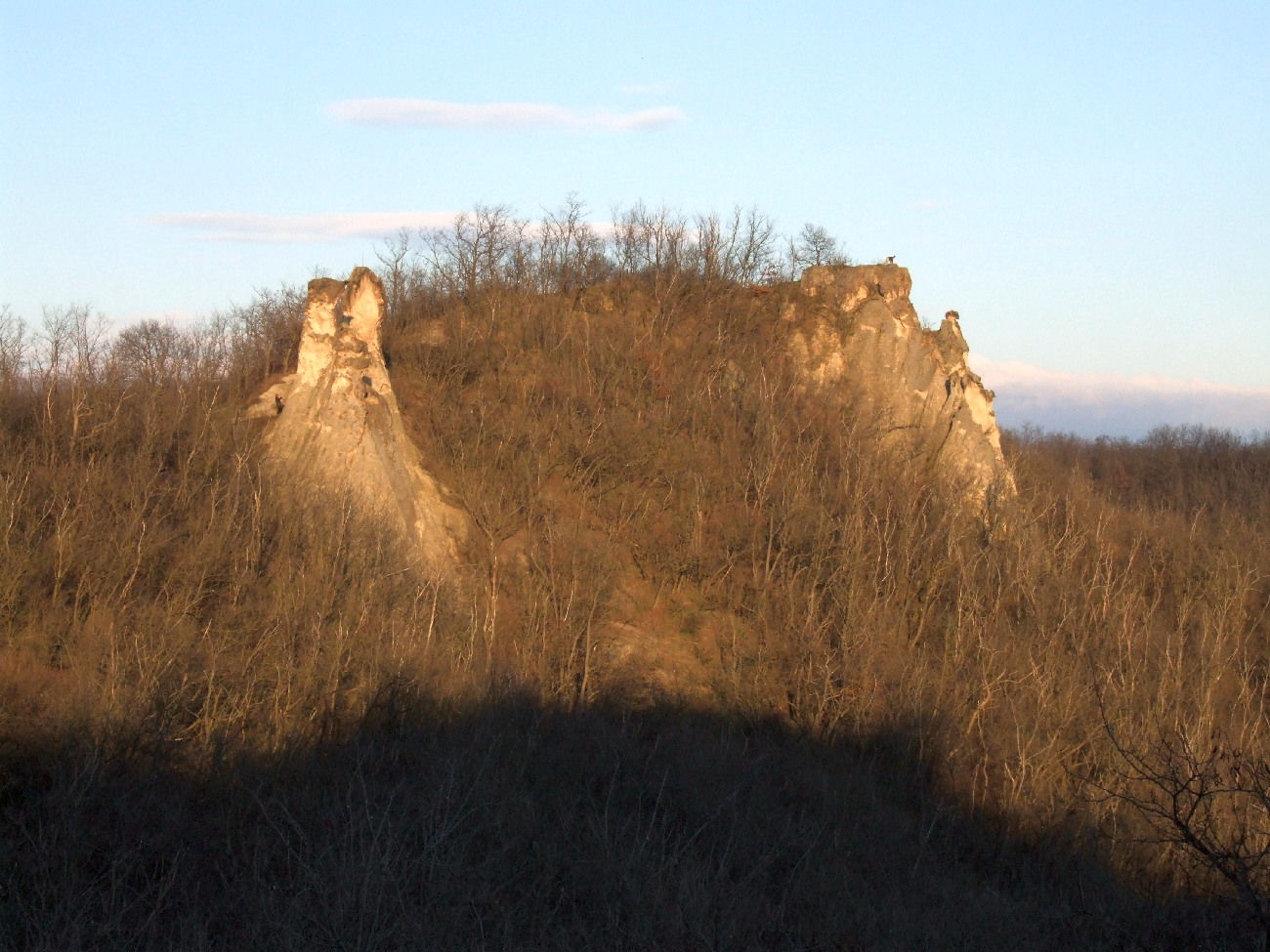
Törökasztal [Turk table], Sirok

Despite the lack of significant archaeological and ethnographic data, the accepted and publicly known view is still the theory that such rock niches are mementos of forest rock beekeeping in the medieval period, and this way of beekeeping was introduced by Kabars who joined the Hungarians during the so-called Hungarian conquest or by Agrians (a group of Thracian-Illyrian refugees from the Balkan peninsula) in earlier ages.

The idea of using the rock niches for actual beekeeping would induce some doubts though. The diversity of cardinal directions of niches, as well as niches carved very close to the ground level or to unreachable points, into dark and cold rock fissures or into vertical sides of gullies raise questions. Narrow and shallow or even somewhat downward-facing niches do not seem to be suitable for beekeeping either. Written sources from the 11th century are evidences of the existence of beekeeping activities (in document archives, you can read about forest beekeepers or bee hunters), but the sources do not mention anything about rock beekeeping. Regarding the cultic vs. economic debate, oral lore is not consistent. The mystery of beehive rocks is therefore still unsettled.

Currently, the purpose of carving the rocks and the intended use of the niches are unknown. So far, the "Who? When? Why?” questions could not be answered without doubts remaining. However, the results of research to date, accompanied by the statistical probability based on evaluation of topographic data, make the idea of the beekeeping use rather doubtful; while "reasons to exclude cultic, sacrificial use of the niches have not been drawn up".

Some fundamental questions would still be unresolved however:

1. How did the cultic rituals related to the niches look like, and what was their underlying religious formation and mythology?
2. What was the time range of carving and using the niches (practicing the cult related to the beehive rocks)?
3. Who created the niches, and who practiced the rituals? What sort of population (group, dynasty, ethnic group, nation) can the formation of beehive rock carvings be associated with?

Due to the lack of charter data and the inconsistency of the folklore, attempts to answer the questions should still be based on – apart from archaeological excavations – topographic data. In the current situation, we can orient ourselves in two aspects:

1. One is expanding the known set of "identical analogies", i.e. finding rimmed niches in other regions and including data associated with the analogies.
2. The other is studying other rock carving features found on beehive rocks or in their wider surroundings or phenomenons (stone culture) related to the niches.

Reviewing and analyzing different carved features (holes, channels, bowl-shaped pits, rock caldrons) is crucial, at least for multiple-aspect comparison and analysis with the known analogies.

== Age ==
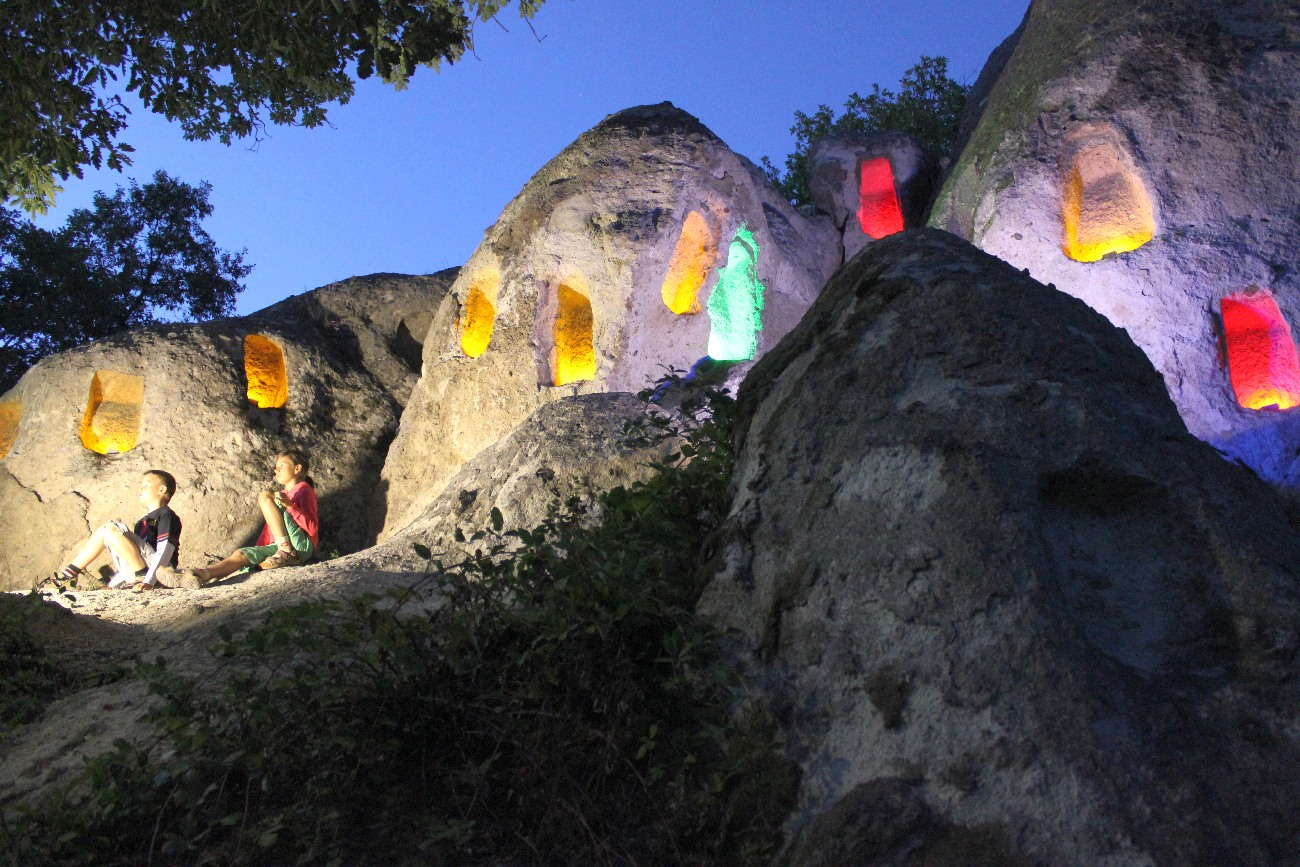
View from the Kaptár-rét [Beehive field] near Szomolya

Based on geomorphological survey and niche periodization attempts for the beehive rocks on the Nyerges-hegy [Saddled hill] near Eger, we can now estimate three major niche carving periods within the calendar of history:

- first generation: 5th–6th centuries (400–550) – age of Huns and Sarmatians;
- second generation: 7th–8th centuries (670–800) – age of Pannonian Avars ("Onoğur" Bulgarians);
- third generation: 10th–16th centuries (900–1500) – age of "Magyar" Hungarians.

When considering the whole Bükkalja, it should be mentioned that the first niches had probably been carved well before the beginning of the Nyerges-based first generation. Dating of them however will require further thorough studies and exploring the analogies. All the archaeological finds brought up so far are associated with the third generation: the ceramic fragments are evidences of use of the niches during the Árpád-kor period (between the 9th and the 14th centuries) of the Kingdom of Hungary, but not proofs regarding the age of the first niches.

== Human contact ==
The wide time range derived from the periodization of niches, accompanied by the territorial distribution of the beehive rocks, suggests primarily that people practicing the rituals related to the niches had already lived in the area even in the age of the Migration Period (age of Huns), then in the age of Avars and Onogurs (late Avars), and also after the so-called Hungarian conquest, and they were a distinct part of the population throughout varying state settings.

Ladislaus I of Hungary issued a code #1 (in 1092, Szabolcs) in which one of the dispositions of the 40 Church-related measures set forth (decr. 1. 22.) acted against pagan rituals; it forbade practicing pagan sacrificial rituals at springs, waters, trees and rocks/stones. Quote from the Latin source: "Quicunque ritu gentilium iuxta puteos sacrificaverit, vel ad arbores et ad fontes, et lapides oblationes obtulerit…” (Whoever practices pagan or national rites of sacrificing at wells, or offers sacrifice at trees, springs and stones...). Though not proven, the word lapis – that could mean pagan altar stone or rock altar, accordingly to Arnold Ipolyi – may stand for beehive rocks as well.

The mysteries around beehive rocks – niches, holes, bowl-shaped pits, channels carved into rock surfaces – can be approached also from the characteristics of such pagan religious practices, with the help of a work by Arnold Ipolyi, titled Magyar Mythológia [Hungarian mythology].

Áld, áldozat [to bless (verb), sacrifice (noun)]. "Sacrifice is an exquisite phenomenon of divine respect, respecting divinity not only by words, but also by means of action and offering".

Szent helyek [Sacred places]. "The migratory-dynamic-wandering lifestyle of our nation can make us suspect that, in our ancient times, demonstrating respect to the divine provider was conducted similarly [as by Scythians, outdoors], at certain ad hoc locations. Choosing such locations accordingly to the ancient respect associated with the religion of nature assumes respect towards the element of Nature; you know, even our memories remember this. Sacrifices at springs, waters, trees and rocks became forbidden by the code of Ladislaus...”

Oltár [Altar]. For conducting sacrificial rites, altars were set up, using flat-sided, special stones. Probably, "prohibition of sacrifice at stones (in the codes of Ladislaus) was related specifically to such altar stones". In charters and area reports from the medieval period, altar stones, shelter stones, idol stones are mentioned frequently.

Bálvány [Idol]. "And did we have idols? Probably yes. The stone on which the bloody animal sacrifice was slaughtered and cut up, and which was used as table and bowl for the offering, and which marked the grave of the deceased – would not only become an altar, it would even emerge as an idol over time, formed into a shape standing above the altar and grave".

Néző [Visual inspector]. On the altar stones (that would emerge to be idols later), rituals were conducted by people with advantaged divine connection (táltos), people with certain supernatural abilities (garaboncos), students (deák), wise people and ministers – also called dissectors – of pagan ages. Ipolyi suggests that the term "boncos" [dissector] reminds us that "they could have been the entrail inspectors, the prophets working from animal entrails, who are still remembered by our chronicles…” Ministers with divine connection of ancient, pagan Hungarians are denoted by various words: táltos, mágus [magician], bölcs [wise], jós [prophet], bűvös [conjurer], bájos [charmer], varázsló [wizard], bélnéző [entrail inspector], hugybanéző [urine-looker], áldozatnéző [sacrifice inspector], oltáron néző [on-altar looker].

== Analogies ==
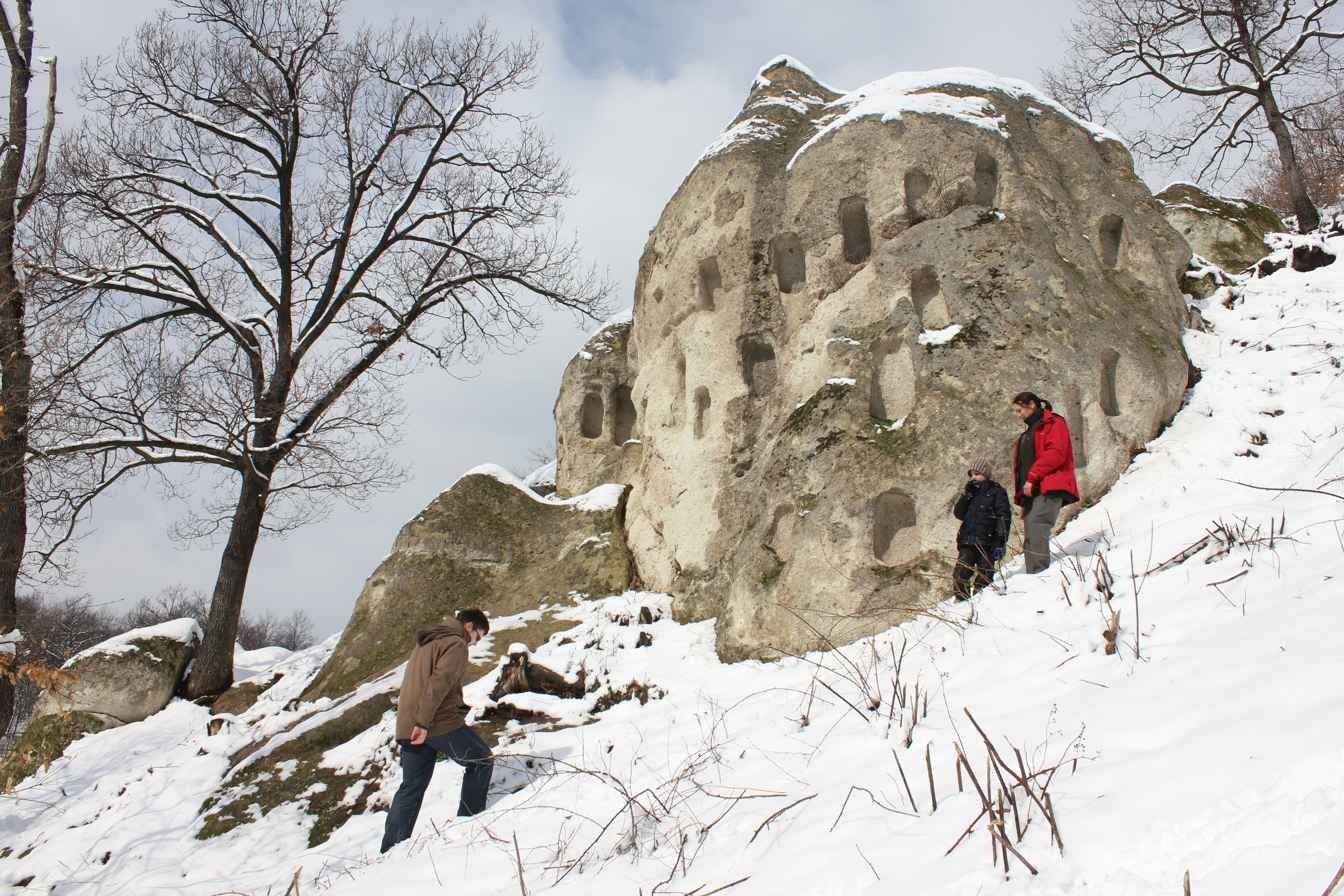
The Királyszéke [King's seat] in winter

In the effort to resolve the mystery of rocks with niches, expanding the known set of "identical analogies" – i.e. finding rimmed niches in other regions – and including data associated with the analogies are useful. Apart from location sites in the Carpathian basin, rocks with niches are known to exist at numerous locations in Eurasia, from the Mediterranean region through Anatolia to the Caucasus mountains, and even in the Altai mountains (at the valley of the Khovd river). The rocks that are most similar to the rocks with niches in Hungary can be found on the Balkan peninsula: on the Royak-Provadia plateau (near the villages of Madara and Royak) in Bulgaria and in the Rhodope mountains.

So we have another thread to start to follow in search for the origin of beehive rocks, diverging from the early medieval period; investigating the story of the Agrian people. Historical studies do not consider the information from Bonfini about the city of Eger to a sufficient degree, however his statements are supported by a series of facts. Accordingly, to Antonio Bonfini, Eger belonged to the domain of Metanastae or Jász or Iazyg people [the Hungarian word "íjász" means archer]. He specifies Agrians as the founders and denominators of the city. They were a group of Thracian-Illyrian refugees from the vicinity of the Rhodope mountains (accordingly to Antonio Bonfini in 1581). [Sámuel Timon suggested that Candanum (the city of the Iazyges) was Eger, and that Metanastae was the same group as the Iazyges. He suggested (on pages 97–98 of his work in 1733–1734) that their name is related to the border of the Roman Empire. The Latin word meta may stand for goal, end or limit indeed, but it may stand for a conical or pyramidal post or a peak (of hill or land) as well. So, Metanastae may stand for a group of people living at/over the border of the empire, but it may stand for peoples raising hillforts or rampant systems as well; think about the defense structures associated with Sarmatian Iazyges – Csörsz dykes (also called Devil dykes); or it may stand for peoples carving stone idols or rock cones.] Strabo, in his work titled Geographica, had already reported on the Illyrian peoples called Agrians living on the Balkan peninsula.

This raises a new question: who were the Agrians, and when could they arrive to this region? They must have been an earlier group of people than the Sarmatian Iazyges who settled on the Great Hungarian Plain around the end of the 1st century BC – accordingly to Bonfini (who was familiar with Byzantine sources); he reported that the Thracian-Illyrian peasants had been expelled from the vicinity of Eger by the Iazyges.

The invasion of Thracian-Cimmerian tribes from the northern foreground of the Black Sea started to escalate around 730 BC, in the age of the pre-Scythian immigrations (Mezőcsát group). The fortification of the settlement of the Kyjatice culture on the Vár-hegy [Fort hill] above the city of Eger (but belonging to the town of Felsőtárkány) was built in this particular age (8th century BC, at the beginning of the so-called HaB_{3} period). Constructing the rampart of the hillfort of the late Bronze Age – early Iron Age may be associated with the first wave of the ingress of the pre-Scythian Mezőcsát group. Who built the fortification is hard to determine: it could have been constructed by the newcomers, or it could be built by the existing peoples against them. In any case, ceramic shapes and decoration types with Babadagian–Besut–Bessarabian–Bulgarian origin have been found in archeological finds at Felsőtárkány. This group of people was aware of iron, and they used Thracian–Cimmerian weaponry and horse tack.

The second attempt to solve the mystery is related to a military campaign. Persian king Darius I crossed the river Danube in 513 BC, and got into the land of the Scythians; he was defeated, but his action made Trachian groups of people leave their territories [based on Herodotus]. Archeology regards this age (from the 5th century BC) of the Carpathian basin and the Balkans as culturally coherent. Roman sources mention tribes speaking Thracian languages living in this area. Agrians could arrive to the Bükkalja during this period.

However, this Balkanian thread may be pivotal in the research of peoples creating the storage niches and carving the rocks. The Thracian cultic niches or rock shrines in the Rhodope mountains, which – accordingly to Bulgarian researchers – were used for urn funerals in the 1st millennium BC, can be regarded as important analogies, as they may be related to the beehive rocks and rock niches in the Bükkalja.

== Gallery ==
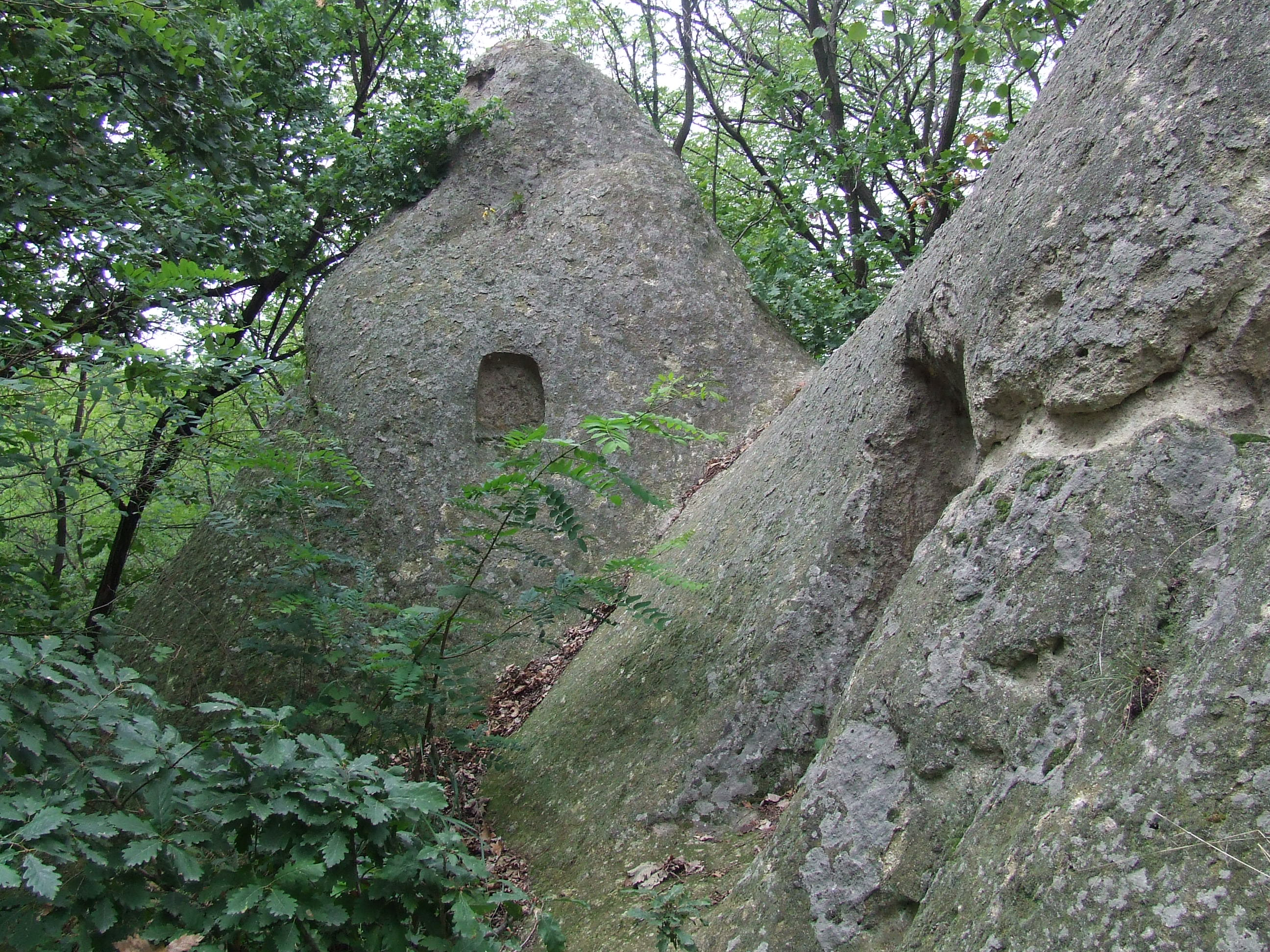
Beehive stones to the east of Eger

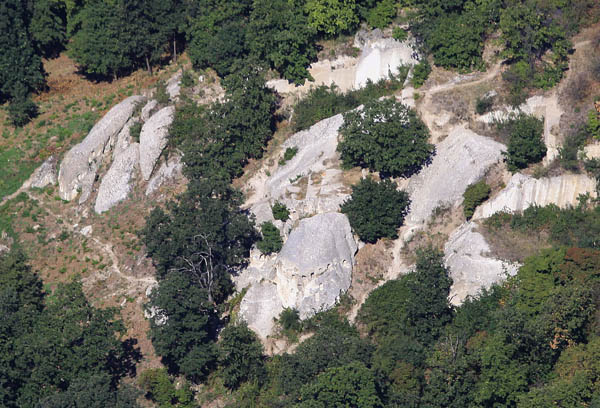

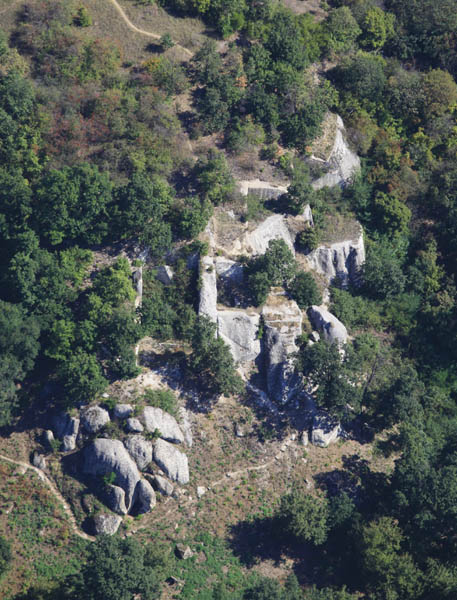

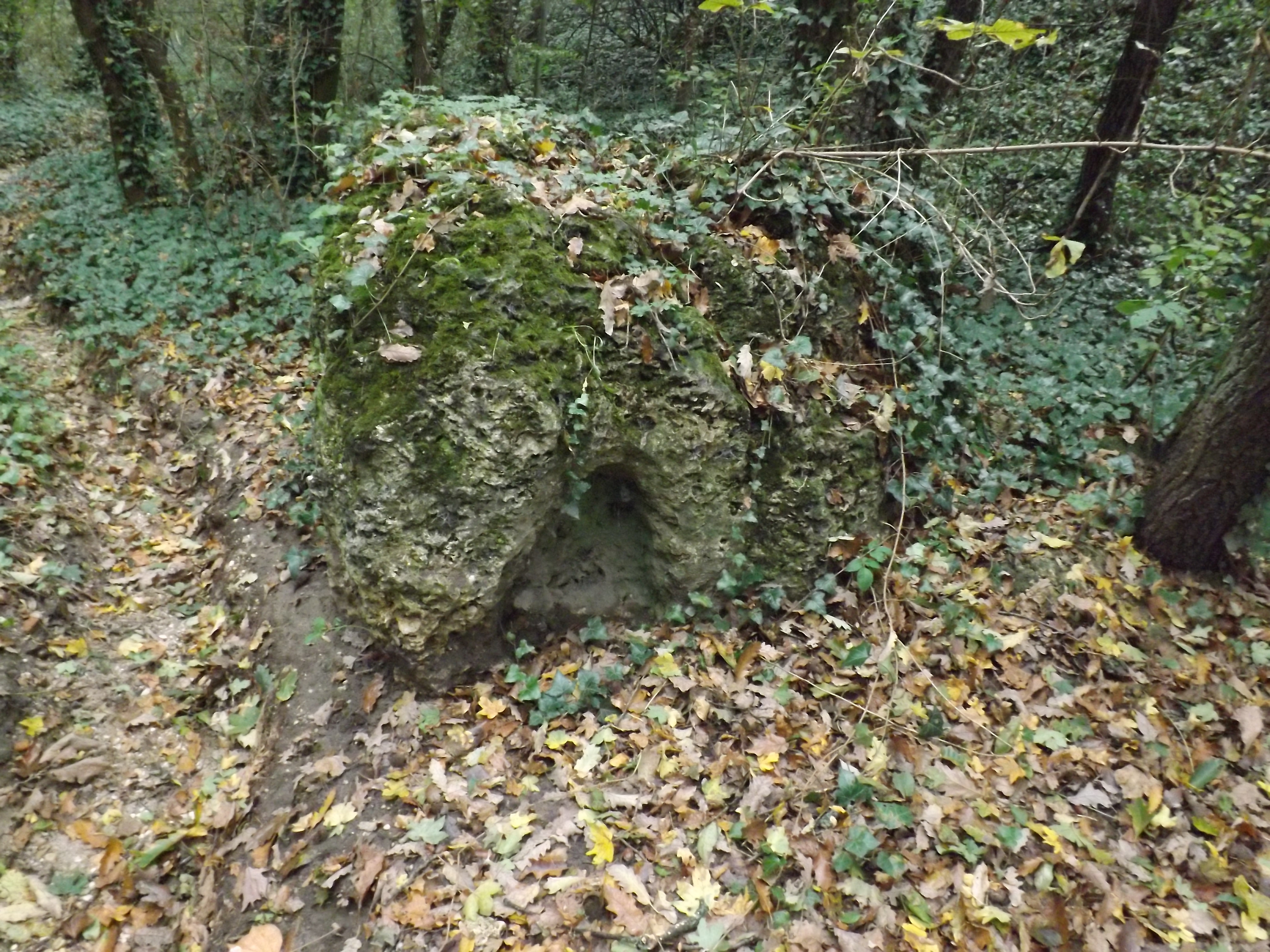
One of the beehive stones in Diósd
