= Cserépváralja =

- Village
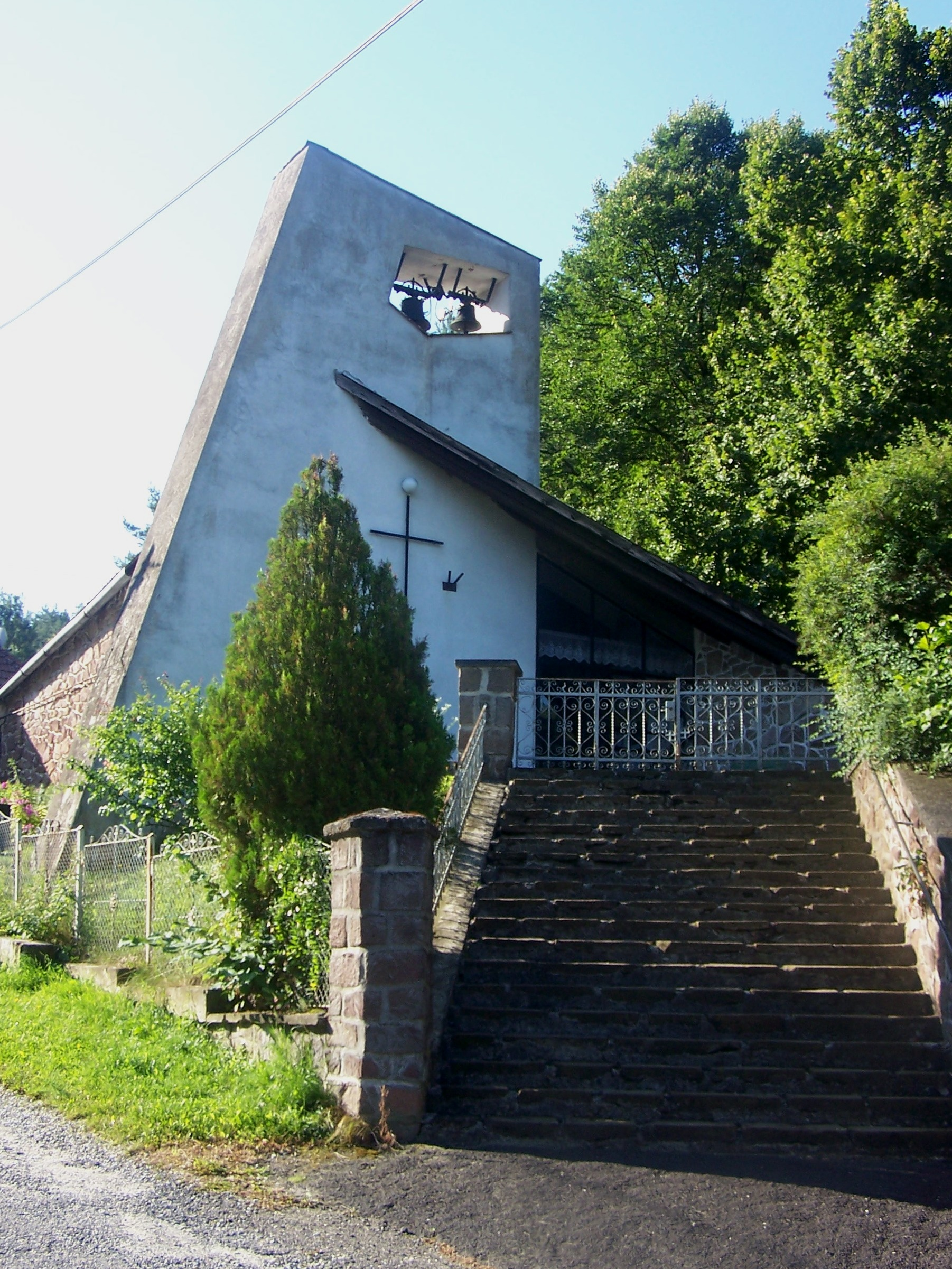

- Flag Coat of arms

- Location of Cserépváralja
- Coordinates: 47.93302°N 20.55948°E
- Country: Hungary
- Region: Northern Hungary
- County: Borsod-Abaúj-Zemplén
- District: Mezőkövesd

Area
  - Total: 14.62 km^{2} (5.64 sq mi)

Population (1 January 2025)
  - Total: 323
  - Density: 22.1/km^{2} (57.2/sq mi)
- Time zone: UTC+1 (CET)
  - Summer (DST): UTC+2 (CEST)
- Postal code: 3417
- Area code: (+36) 49
- Website: www.cserepvaralja.hu

Cserépváralja is a village in Borsod-Abaúj-Zemplén county, Hungary.
