= Noszvaj =

- Village (község)
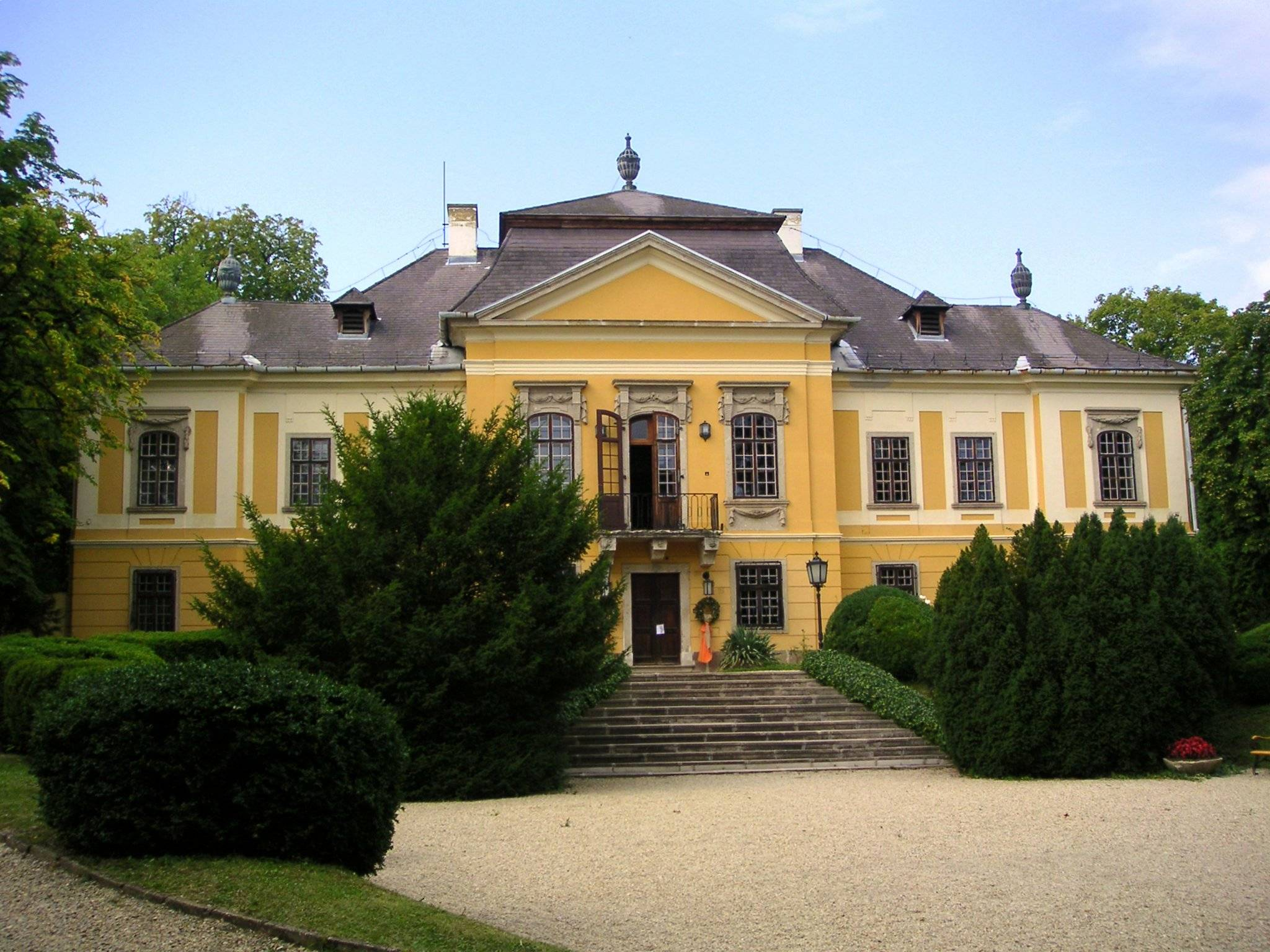
- De La Motte palace

- Flag Coat of arms

- Location of Heves County in Hungary

- Location of Noszvaj in Hungary
- Coordinates: 47°56′13″N 20°28′30″E
- Country: Hungary
- Region: Northern Hungary
- County: Heves County
- Subregion: Eger District

Government
  - Mayor: Géza Bóta

Area
  - Total: 18.84 km^{2} (7.27 sq mi)

Population (1 Jan. 2015)
  - Total: 1,891
  - Density: 102.18/km^{2} (264.6/sq mi)
- Time zone: UTC+1 (CET)
  - Summer (DST): UTC+2 (CEST)
- Postal code: 3325
- Area code: 36
- Website: www.noszvaj.hu

Noszvaj is a village in Heves County, Northern Hungary Region, Hungary.

== Sights to visit ==
- De La Motte palace
- Galassy palace

== Gallery ==
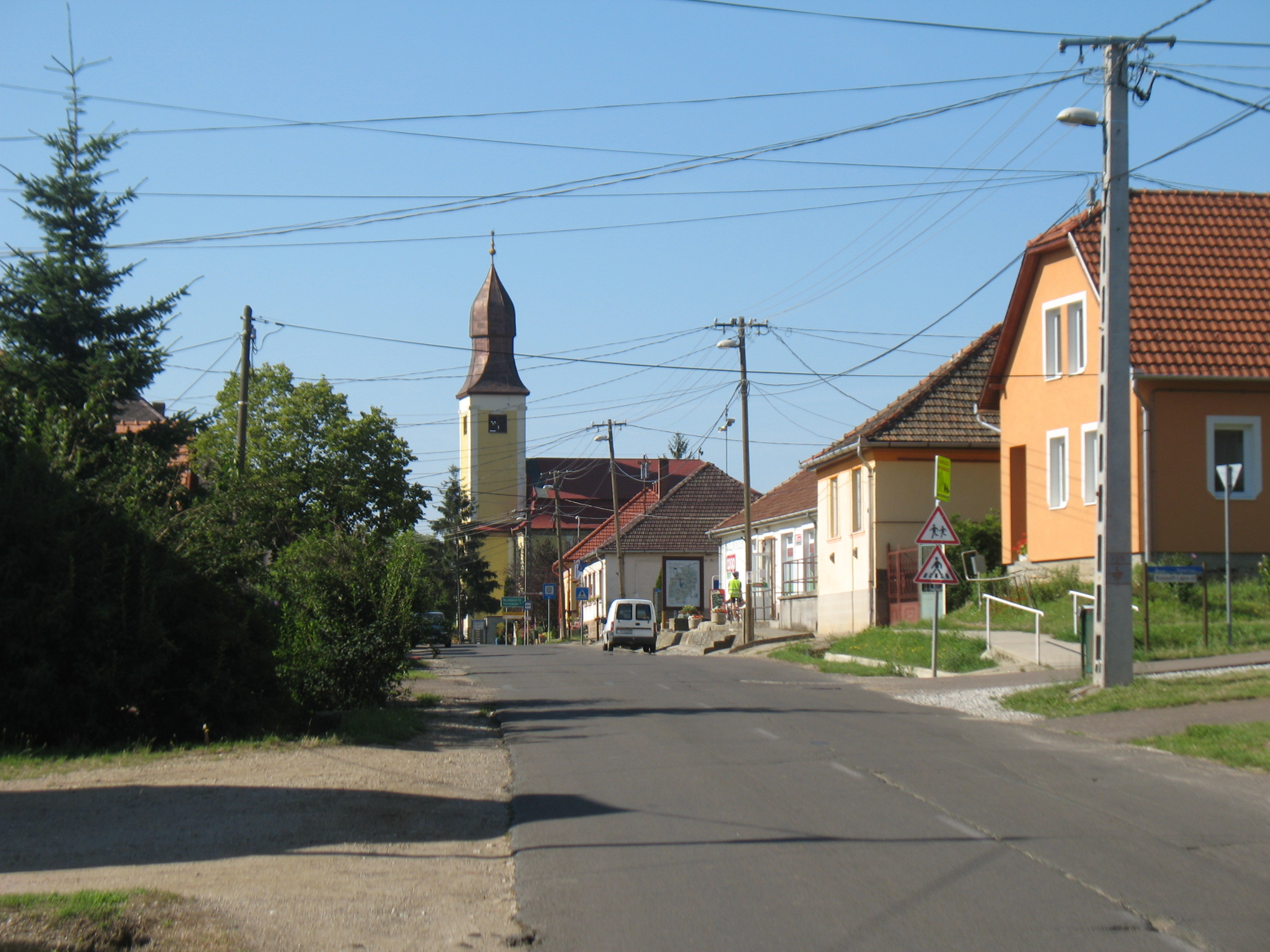
The church

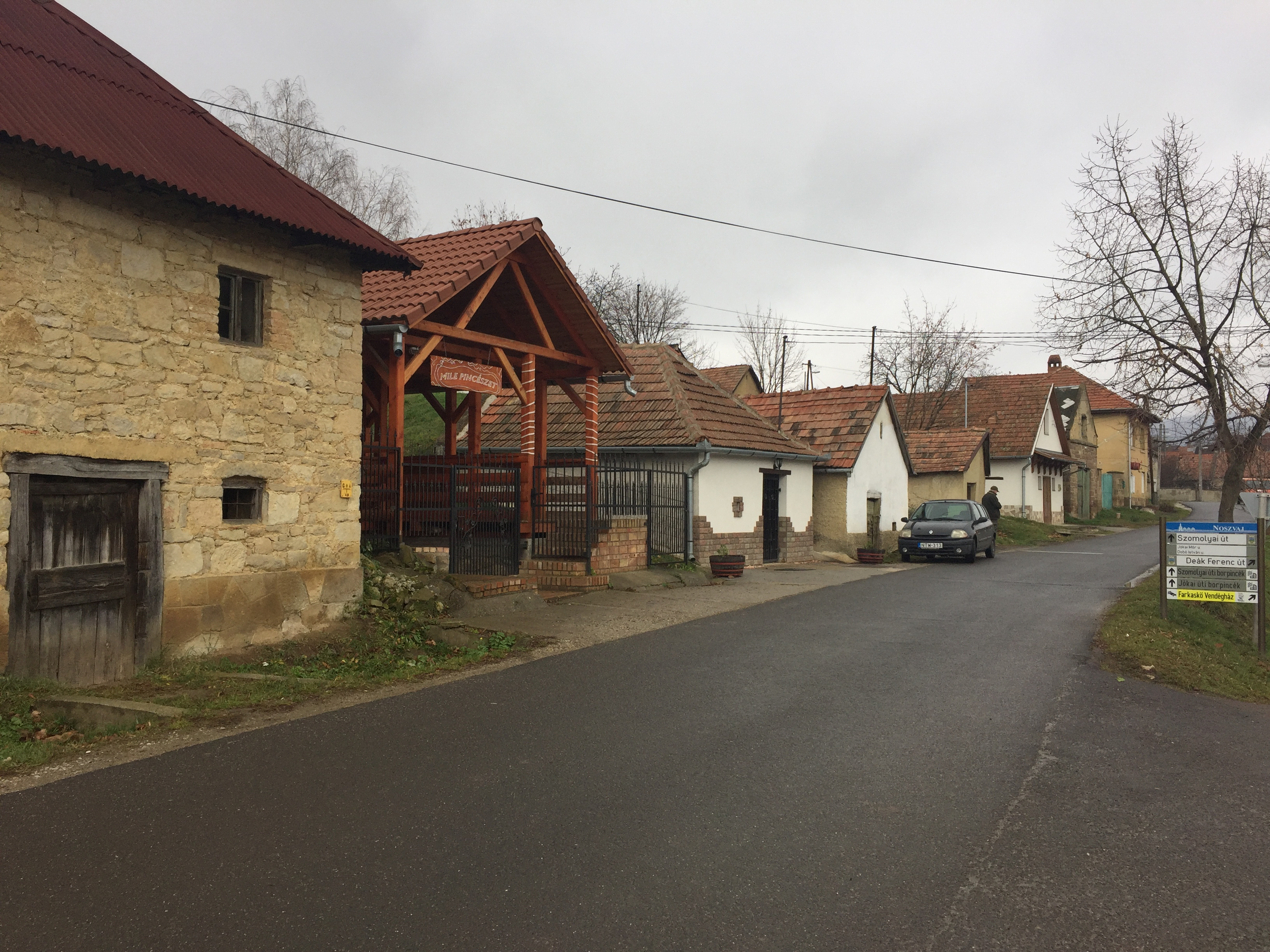
A street in Noszvaj

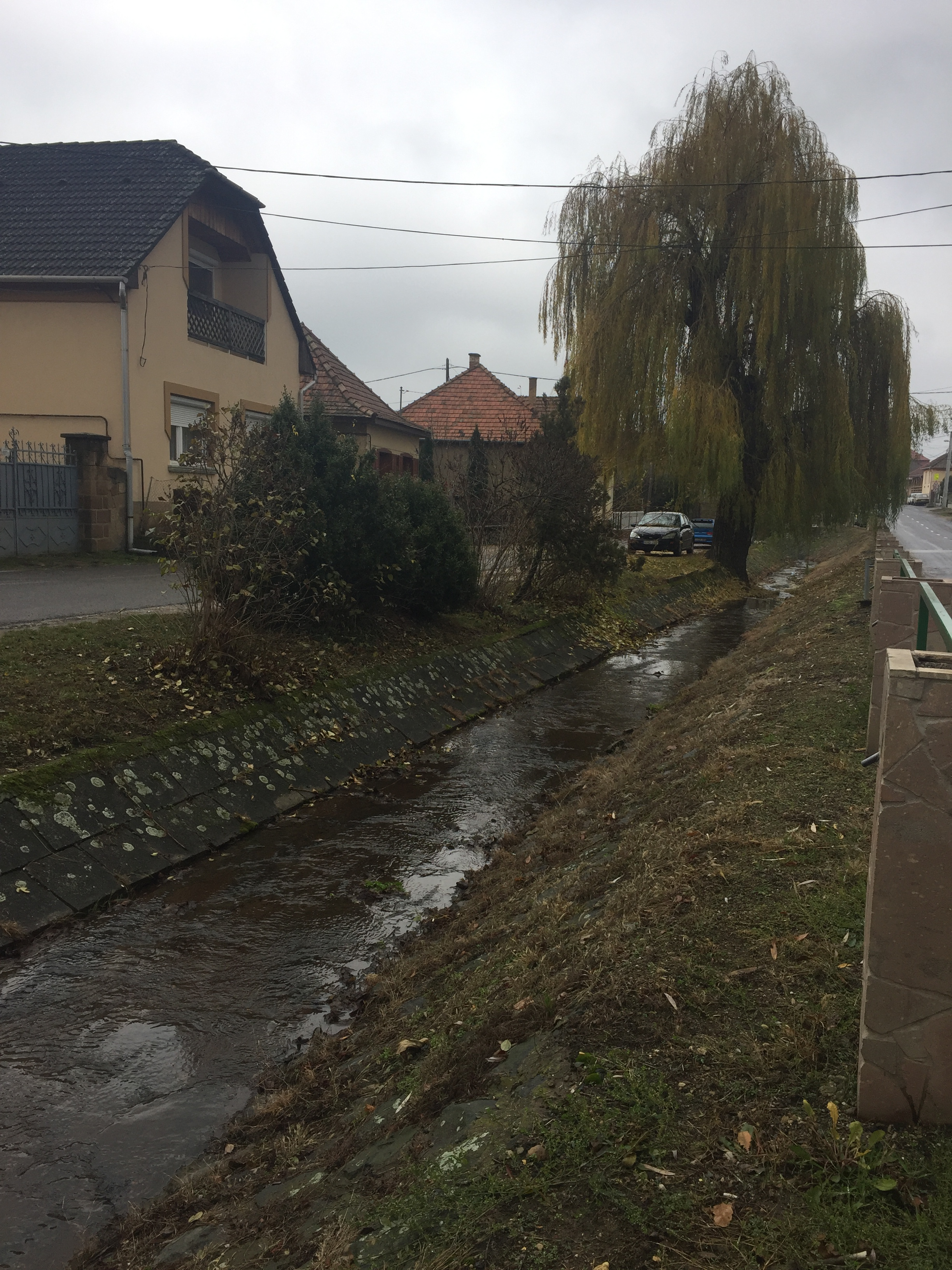
Kánya stream

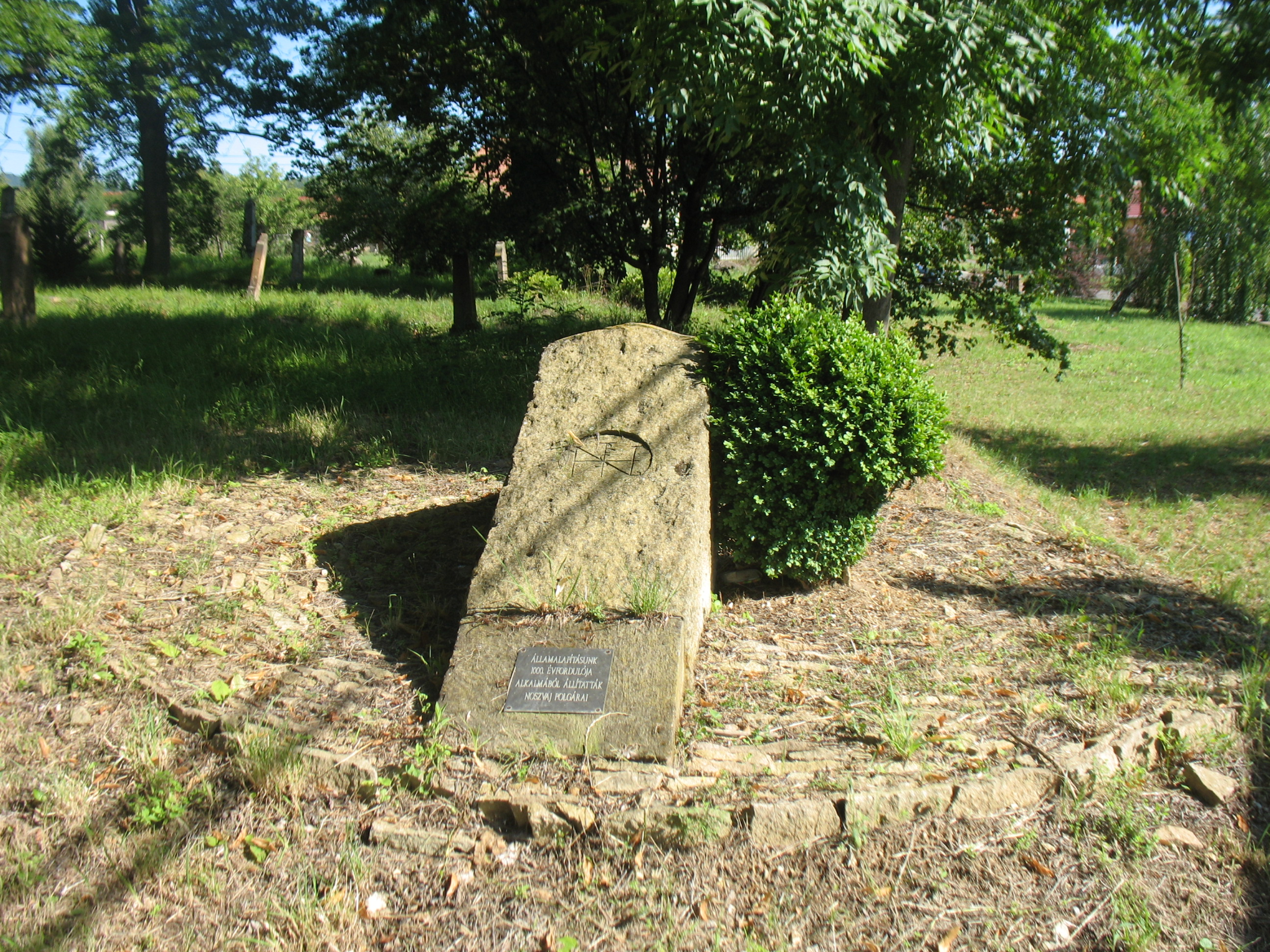

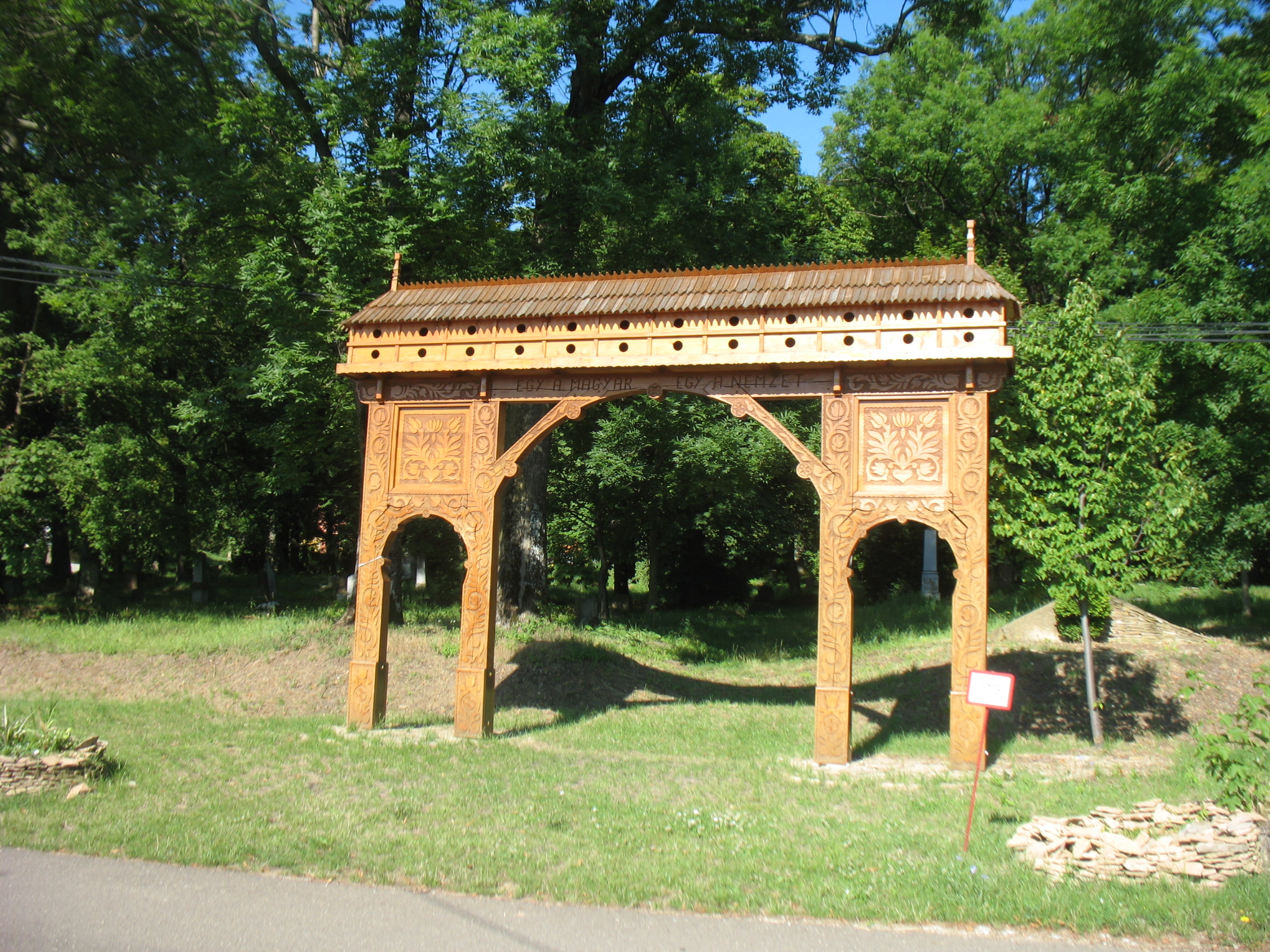
The cemetery

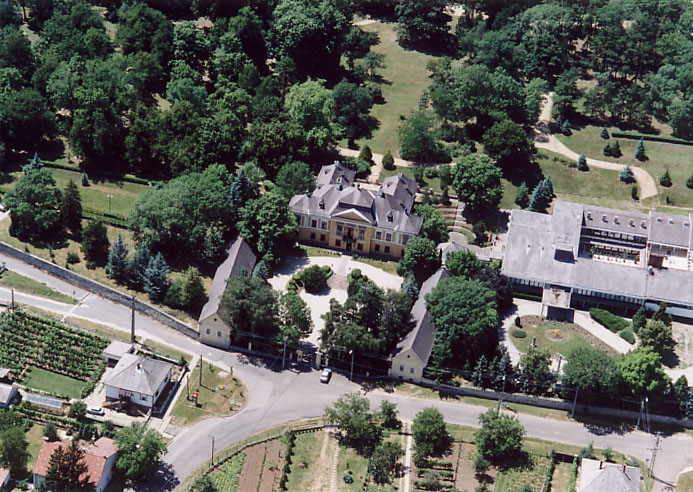
De La Motte palace

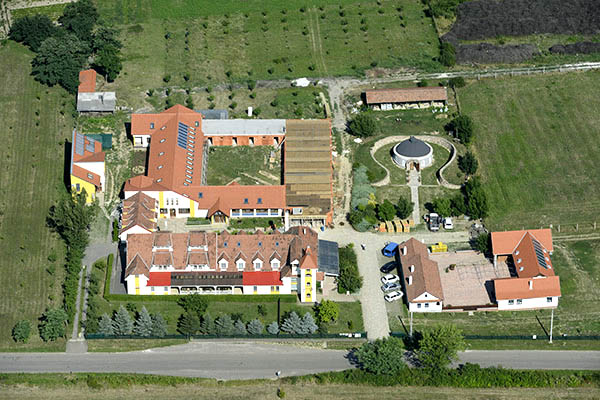
Medicin
