= Szomolya =

- Flag Coat of arms

- Location of Borsod-Abaúj-Zemplén county in Hungary

- Location of Szomolya
- Coordinates: 47.89194°N 20.49637°E
- Country: Hungary
- County: Borsod-Abaúj-Zemplén

Area
  - Total: 22.69 km^{2} (8.76 sq mi)

Population (2004)
  - Total: 1,723
  - Density: 75.93/km^{2} (196.7/sq mi)
- Time zone: UTC+1 (CET)
  - Summer (DST): UTC+2 (CEST)
- Postal code: 3411
- Area code: 49

Szomolya is a village in Borsod-Abaúj-Zemplén county, Hungary.

== Gallery ==
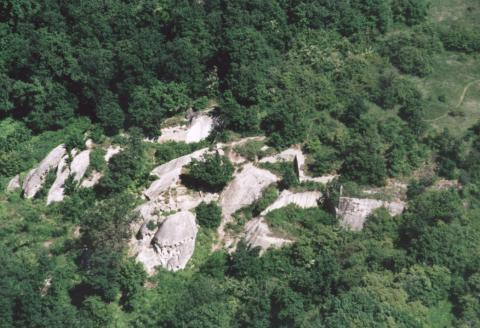

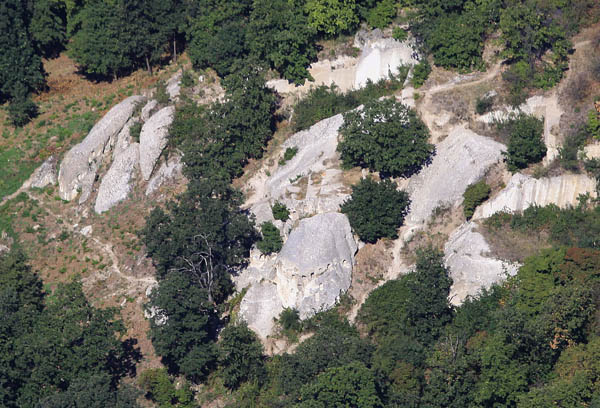

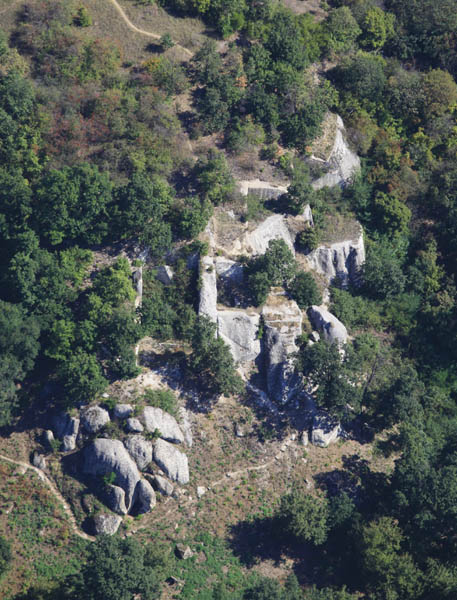
