= List of institutes in Bangladesh =

list of institutes in Bangladesh:

== State supported (public) institutes ==
- Army Institute of Business Administration (Army IBA)
- Bangladesh Foreign Trade Institute (BFTI)
- Bangladesh Institute of Bank Management (BIBM)
- Bangladesh Institute of Development Studies (BIDS)
- Bangladesh Institute of Governance and Management (BIGM)
- Bangladesh Institute of Management (BIM)
- Bangladesh Institute of Marine Technology (BIMT)
- Bangladesh Institute of Maritime Research and Development (BIMRAD)
- Bangladesh Institute of Peace and Security Studies
- Bangladesh Institute of Sports Education (BKSP)
- Bangladesh Insurance Academy (BIA)
- Bangladesh Marine Fisheries Academy (BMFA)
- Bangladesh Marine Academy (BMA)
- Bangladesh Planning Commission
- Bangladesh Public Administration Training Centre (BPATC) Savar, Dhaka
- Bangladesh Tea Research Institute
- BCS Administration Academy (BCSAA) Shahbag, Dhaka
- Dhaka School of Economics (DScE), Dhaka University
- Institute of Bangladesh Studies, Rajshahi University
- Institute of Business Administration (IBA), Dhaka University
- Institute of Business Administration, University of Rajshahi
- Institute of Business Administration, Jahangirnagar University
- Institute of Chartered Accountants of Bangladesh (ICAB)
- Institute of Chartered Secretaries of Bangladesh (ICSB)
- Institute of Cost and Management Accountants of Bangladesh (ICMAB)
- Institute of Education and Research (IER), Dhaka University
- Institute of Information Technology (IIT), Dhaka University
- Institute of Statistical Research and Training (ISRT), University of Dhaka
- Institute of Leather Engineering & Technology (ILET), University of Dhaka
- Institute of Business Administration, Jahangirnagar University
- Military Institute of Science and Technology (MIST)
- National Academy for Planning and Development (NAPD)
- National Institute of Preventive and Social Medicine (NIPSOM)

== Public-Private-Partnership (PPP) institutes ==
- National Institute of Textile Engineering and Research (NITER)

== Private institutes ==
- Bangladesh Association of Software and Information Services (BASIS)
- Bangladesh Computer Samity
- Bangladesh Health Profession Institute
- Bangladesh Institute for Professional Development (BIPD)
- Bangladesh Institute of Human Resources Management (BIHRM)
- Bangladesh Institute of Information Technology (BIIT)
- Bangladesh Institute of Labour Studies (BILS)
- Bangladesh Institute of Management Studies (BIMS)
- Bangladesh Institute of Science and Technology
- Centre for Policy Dialogue
- Chartered Institute of Human Resources and Development, Bangladesh (CIHRD)
- Daffodil Institute of IT (DIIT)
- Daffodil Health Institute (DHI)
- Design Academy Bangladesh
- Haji Abul Hossain Institute of Technology
- Heritage International College of Aviation, Science and Management
- Institute of Science and Technology (IST)
- Narayanganj Institute of Islam
- Technical Youth Training Centre

== See also ==
- Education in Bangladesh
- List of universities in Bangladesh
- List of schools in Bangladesh
- List of colleges in Bangladesh
- List of medical colleges in Bangladesh
- List of dental schools in Bangladesh
- Textile schools in Bangladesh
- List of architecture schools in Bangladesh
- University Grants Commission (Bangladesh)
