= Dee =

Dee or DEE may refer to:

== People ==
=== Surname ===
- Dee, an alternate spelling of the Welsh surname Day
- Dee, a romanization of several Chinese surnames, including:
  - Those listed at Di (surname)
  - Some Hokkien pronunciations of the surname Li (李)
- Di Renjie (630–700), Duke Wenhui of Liang, a Tang dynasty official
- AJ Dee (born 1983), Filipino actor, swimmer and brother of actor Enchong Dee
- Arthur Dee (1579–1651), English physician and alchemist
- Billy Dee, African American adult film actor
- Bob Dee (1933–1979), American football defensive end
- Bruce Dee (born 2006), English para swimmer
- Daisy Dee (born 1970), Dutch singer, actress and TV host
- Dave Dee (1943–2009), English singer-songwriter, musician, A&R manager, fundraiser and businessman
- Ed Dee (born 1940), American author
- Enchong Dee (born 1998), Filipino actor
- Frances Dee (1909–2004), American actress
- Gerry Dee (born 1968), Canadian comedian
- Jack Dee (born 1961), British comedian
- Jeff Dee (born 1961), American artist and game designer
- Joey Dee (born 1940), American singer, of Joey Dee and the Starliters
- John Dee (disambiguation)
  - John Dee (1527–1608 or 1609), English mathematician and alchemist
- Kiki Dee (born 1947), English singer
- Leo Dee (1931–2004), American artist
- Marvin R. Dee (1917–1977), American lawyer, businessman, and politician
- Merri Dee (1936–2022), American journalist and philanthropist
- Michelle Dee (born 1995), Filipino actress and beauty pageant titleholder
- Mike Dee, American sports executive
- Mike Dee (baseball coach) (born 1958), American college baseball coach
- Mikkey Dee (born 1963), Swedish drummer with the band Motörhead
- Philip Dee (1904–1983), English nuclear physicist
- Roger Dee (1914–2004), American author
- Ruby Dee (1922–2014), African-American actress and activist
- Sandra Dee (1942–2005), American actress
- Simon Dee (1935–2009), British television interviewer and radio disc jockey

=== Given name ===
- Dee Benson, American judge
- Dee Bradley Baker (born 1962), American voice actor
- Dee Brock (born 1930), American educator
- Dee Brown (politician) (born 1948), American politician
- Dee D. Jackson (born 1954), British singer
- Dee Delaney (born 1995), American football player
- Dee Hepburn (born 1961), Scottish actress
- Dee Palmer (born 1937), English musician
- Dee Roscioli (born 1977), American actress
- Dee Scarr, scuba diver and environmentalist in Bonaire
- Dee Snider (born 1955), American musician and lead singer of Twisted Sister
- Dee Wallace (born 1948), American actress

=== Stage name or nickname ===
- Dee (nickname), a list of people nicknamed "Dee"
- Dee (singer), Canadian singer, songwriter, disc jockey, producer and multi-instrumentalist Martin Granger
- Dee (artist), Swedish singer and dancer Dilnarin Demirbag (born 1973)
- Dee Harvey, American R&B singer Demetrius Harvey (1965–2012)
- Dee C. Lee, British singer Diane Catherine Sealy (born 1961)
- Kool Moe Dee, American hip hop MC Mohandas Dewese (born 1962)
- Papa Dee, Swedish rap, ragga and dancehall musician David Wahlgren (born 1966)

== Fictional characters ==
- Judge Dee, a semi-fictional character based on Di Renjie, Duke Wenhui of Liang
- Anastasia Dualla or Dee, from the television series Battlestar Galactica
- Deandra Reynolds, "Sweet Dee" of the television series It's Always Sunny in Philadelphia
- Dee, a secret character in the Darkstalkers fighting game series
- Gandra Dee, a Duck Tales character
- Waddle Dee, a Kirby character
- Dee Thomas, from the sitcom What's Happening!!
- Dee Vasquez, from Phoenix Wright: Ace Attorney
- Dee, the primary duck antagonist from the animated series Chuck Chicken

== Places ==
- River Dee, Aberdeenshire, Scotland, flowing from the Cairngorms to Aberdeen
- River Dee, Wales, flowing through North Wales and through Cheshire in England
- River Dee, Cumbria, flowing from the border between Cumbria and North Yorkshire
- River Dee, Galloway, in Dumfries and Galloway, Scotland
- River Dee (Ireland)
- Dee River (Queensland), Australia, a tributary of the Dawson
- Dee River (Tasmania), Australia, a tributary of the River Derwent
- Dee, Pennsylvania, United States, an unincorporated community
- Dee Island, Antarctica
- De'e, a town in Longlin Various Nationalities Autonomous County, Guangxi, China

== As an acronym or code ==
- Department of the Environment and Energy, Australia
- Dundee railway station, station code
- Yuzhno-Kurilsk Mendeleyevo Airport, IATA code
- Dead-end elimination

== Other uses ==
- HMS Dee, various Royal Navy ships
- Dee (gender identity), a gender identity in Thailand
- Dee Events Center, a multi-purpose indoor arena on the campus of Weber State University, Ogen, Utah, United States
- Dee, a song in the album Blizzard of Ozz
- A D-shaped electrode in a cyclotron
- A D-shaped ring, a D-ring or dee-ring
- The letter "D" in English alphabet#Letter names
- Dee, the concept car BMW i Vision Dee
- Dee, one of the mascots of PBS Kids since 2013

== See also ==
- D (disambiguation)
- Dhee (disambiguation)
- Deedee (disambiguation), including DeeDee and Dee Dee
