= Dee (nickname) =

Dee is the nickname of:

== Entertainers ==
=== In music ===
- Dee Alexander, American jazz singer
- Dee Barton (1937–2001), American jazz trombonist, big band drummer and composer
- Dee Harvey (1965–2012), American R&B singer
- Dee C Lee (born 1961), British soul, R&B, and pop singer
- Dee D. Jackson (born 1954), British disco singer
- Dewi Lestari (born 1976), Indonesian writer, singer, and songwriter
- Dee Palmer (born 1937), English musician and former member of Jethro Tull
- Demetra Plakas (born 1960), American musician, drummer in the rock band L7
- Dee Roscioli (born 1977), American singer and actress who performed in productions of the musical, Wicked
- Dee Snider (born 1955), American singer-songwriter, screenwriter, radio personality, and actor best known as the lead singer of the heavy metal band Twisted Sister
- Dee Ho (born 1990), Hong Kong singer-songwriter

=== In film and television ===
- Dee Bradley Baker (born 1962), American voice actor
- Dee Smart (born 1966), Australian actress known as Lucinda Croft in the soap opera Home and Away
- Dee Wallace (born 1948), American actress known for her role as Mary in the 1982 film E.T. the Extra-Terrestrial
- Dee Rees (born 1977), American screenwriter and director

== Athletes ==
=== In baseball ===
- Dee Brown (baseball) (born 1978), American former professional baseball outfielder
- Dee Cousineau (1898–1951), American professional baseball player
- Dee Miles (1909–1976), American professional baseball outfielder
- Dee Phillips (1919–2004), American professional baseball player, manager, and scout
- Dee Strange-Gordon (born 1988), American professional baseball center fielder
- Dee Walsh (1890–1971), American Major League Baseball outfielder and shortstop

=== In basketball ===
- Dee Ayuba (1986–2018), British–Nigerian basketball forward
- Dee Bost (born 1989), American-born naturalized Bulgarian professional basketball player
- Dee Brown (basketball) (born 1968), American retired professional basketball player
- Dee Brown (basketball) (born 1984), American professional basketball player and college coach
- Dee Davis (born 1984), American retired professional basketball player
- Dee Rowe (1929–2021), American basketball coach

=== In football ===
- Dee Brown (American football) (born 1978), American football running back
- Dee Dowis (1968–2016), American quarterback for the United States Air Force Academy
- Dee Hardison (1956–2018), American National Football League defensive lineman
- Dee Hart (born 1992), American football running back
- Dee Martin (born 1949), American football defensive back
- Dee McCann (born 1983), American former professional gridiron football cornerback
- Dee Milliner (born 1991), American football cornerback
- Dee Virgin (born 1993), American football cornerback
- Dee Webb (born 1984), American football defensive back
- Dee Williams (American football) (born 1999), American football player
- Dee Winters (born 2000), American football player

=== In running ===
- Dee Boeckmann (1906–1989), American middle-distance runner

== Politicians ==
- Dee Brown (politician) (born 1948), American politician from Montana
- Dee Doocey (born 1948), British Liberal Democrat politician and former Chair of the London Assembly
- Dee Duponte (1910/11–1971), Hawaii territorial politician
- Dee Forbes (born 1967), Irish Director-General of RTÉ
- Walter Dee Huddleston (1926–2018), American Democrat from Kentucky who represented the state in the United States Senate
- Dee Caperton Kessel (1943–2000), Former First Lady of West Virginia and Miss West Virginia (1964)
- Dee Margetts (born 1955), a former Australian politician
- Dee Margo (born 1952), American businessman and 54th mayor of El Paso, Texas
- Dee Morikawa, American politician and member of the Hawaii House of Representatives
- Dee Richard (born 1955), American Independent members of the Louisiana House of Representatives
- Dee Ryall (born 1967), Australian politician and member of the Victorian Legislative Assembly

== People in other fields ==
- Dee Brasseur (born 1953), Canadian retired military officer (Major)
- Dee Brown (writer) (1908–2002), American novelist, historian, and librarian
- Dee Caffari (born 1973), British sailor and first woman to single-handedly sail non-stop around the world against the prevailing winds and currents
- Dee Haslam (born 1954), American businesswoman, and CEO and executive producer of RIVR Media
- Dee Mangin, New Zealand primary care academic
- Dee Mosbacher (born 1949), American filmmaker, lesbian feminist activist, and practicing psychiatrist
- Dee O'Hara (born 1935), NASA's first aerospace nurse
- Dee Wells (1925–2003), American journalist, novelist, and broadcaster

== Fictional characters ==
- Dee Bliss, on the Australian soap opera Neighbours
- Deandra Reynolds, on the FX television series It's Always Sunny in Philadelphia

== See also ==
- Dee (disambiguation)
