= Ministry of Commerce (Bangladesh) =

Government ministry of Bangladesh

- Bengali: বাণিজ্য মন্ত্রণালয়
- Government Seal of Bangladesh

Ministry overview
- Formed: 12 January 1972; 54 years ago
- Jurisdiction: Government of Bangladesh
- Headquarters: Bangladesh Secretariat, Dhaka
- Annual budget: ৳328 crore (US$27 million) (2026-2027)
- Minister responsible: Khandakar Abdul Muktadir
- Ministry executives: Mohammad Selim Uddin, Secretary
- Child agencies: Bangladesh Competition Commission; Bangladesh Tariff Commission; Office of the Registrar of Joint Stock Companies and Firms; Import and Export Control Department; The Institute of Cost and Management Accountants; The Institute of Chartered Accountants; National Consumer Rights Protection Department; Trading Corporation of Bangladesh; Bangladesh Tea Board; Bangladesh Foreign Trade Institute; Bangladesh Export Promotion Bureau; Bangladesh Tea Research Institute; Business Promotion Council
- Website: www.mincom.gov.bd

The Ministry of Commerce (Bengali: বাণিজ্য মন্ত্রণালয়, romanized: Bāṇijyô Montronaloy) is a ministry of the Government of Bangladesh responsible for formulating and implementing national trade and commerce policies, regulating domestic and international trade, and promoting Bangladesh's commercial and export sectors.

== Directorate ==
- Bangladesh Competition Commission
- Bangladesh Tariff Commission
- Office of the Registrar of Joint Stock Companies and Firms
- Import and Export Control Department
- The Institute of Cost and Management Accountants
- The Institute of Chartered Accountants of Bangladesh
- National Consumer Rights Protection Department
- Trading Corporation of Bangladesh (TCB)
- Bangladesh Tea Board
- Bangladesh Foreign Trade Institute
- Bangladesh Export Promotion Bureau
- Bangladesh Tea Research Institute
- Business Promotion Council
