= Import and export =

Import and export or import/export may refer to:

- Import and export of goods
  - International trade
  - Import/export regulations, trade regulations of such goods
  - Import/export tariffs, taxes on the trade in such goods
- Import and export of data in computing, the moving of data between applications
  - Import and export of formats, data conversion from one file type to another
- Import/Export, a 2007 Austrian film
- Import and Export (constituency), a functional constituency of the Hong Kong Legislative Council
- Office of Chief Controller of Imports and Exports, a government regulatory department in Bangladesh
- In computer programming:
  - An import statement allows a module to access the exposed (exported) capabilities of another module, or qualifies a symbol by adding the symbol into current scope without specifying the namespace.
  - An export statement publicly exposes part of a module to its importers.
- Import–export (logic), a form of deductive argument in classical logic

== See also ==
- Import (disambiguation)
- Export (disambiguation)
