= ICSB =

ICSB may refer to:

- Institute of Chartered Secretaries of Bangladesh
- International Committee on Systematic Bacteriology, former name of International Committee on Systematics of Prokaryotes, the body that oversees the nomenclature of prokaryotes
- International Conference on Systems Biology, the primary international conference for systems biology research, meeting annually since 2000
- International Christian School of Budapest, an international K-12 coeducational school in Diosd, Hungary, founded 1994

School:

- Immaculate Conception School for Boys, A Catholic Private School located in Malolos, Bulacan, Philippines
