= Export (disambiguation) =

Export is the movement of goods, or selling of services out of a country, area or settlement. It also refers to exporting in international trade.

Export may also refer to:

== Places ==
- Export, Pennsylvania, a borough of Westmoreland County, Pennsylvania, US
- Export, West Virginia, US
- Export rail station, a goods rail station on the Primorskaya Line, St. Petersburg, Russia

== Science and technology ==
- EXPORT, an Exobiology experiment, developed by ESA, to be externally mounted on the ISS
- Export, converting a computer file into a format other than the original format; See Import and export of data
- export, a keyword in various programming languages
  - export, a keyword in C++ for a module to mark a symbol as publicly exported
  - export, a keyword in JavaScript which exposes a symbol for usage in other files
  - export, a keyword in D which exposes a symbol for usage in other files
  - export, a keyword in Zig which exports a symbol from a compiled library or binary
  - exports, a keyword in Java for a module to export a package
- Other means of exporting symbols from shared libraries:
  - @JsExport, an annotation in Kotlin (and Java) for exposing a declaration to JavaScript
  - JNIEXPORT, a preprocessor macro in C for Java Native Interface declarations
  - Compiler export macros, such as __declspec(dllexport) (MSVC) or [[gnu::visibility("default")]] (GCC and Clang), for exposing symbols from a shared library
- export, a Unix command that is usually a shell builtin

== Politics ==
- Export of revolution, actions by a victorious revolutionary government to promote similar revolutions in other countries

== People ==
- Valie Export (1940–2026), Austrian artist

== Consumables ==
- Molson Export, a type of Canadian beer
- Dortmunder Export, a pale lager
- Oland Export Ale is a type of Canadian beer
- Emu Export, a type of Australian beer
- Export, a type of Scottish beer
- Export (cigarette), a Canadian line of cigarettes and rolling tobacco produced by JTI Macdonald

== See also ==
- Import (disambiguation)
- Import and export
