= Import (disambiguation) =

Import is the act of bringing goods into a country.

Import may also refer to:

- import and export of data, in computing
- import tariff, a tax on imported goods
- import quota, a type of trade restriction
- Import substitution industrialization, an economic policy
- Import scene, a subculture that centers on modifying imported brand cars
- An Include directive or import statement in various programming languages:
  - The import keyword in Java, for dequalifying namespaces
  - The import keyword in C++, for importing and linking a module to a translation unit
  - The import keyword in Python, which loads a module into the cache and interprets its contents
  - The #import directive in Objective-C, for including a header at most one time

== See also ==
- Export (disambiguation)
- Import and export
