= DH1 =

DH1 may refer to:

- DH-1 (rocket), a proposed two-stage rocket design
- Airco DH.1, a British First World War biplane
- EMD DH1, an experimental switching locomotive
- Häfeli DH-1, a Swiss reconnaissance aircraft built 1916
- Rhodesia Railways class DH1, a class of diesel locomotive
