= Johnny Dee =

Johnny Dee may refer to:

- Johnny Dee (Marvel Comics), a fictional mutant character
- Johnny Dee (basketball), American basketball player
- Johnny Dee (musician), American heavy metal drummer
- Johnny Dee, alias for 1950s and 1960s American singer and songwriter John D. Loudermilk (1934–2016)

== See also ==
- John Dee (disambiguation)
- Johnnie Dee, Canadian rock vocalist
