= Diósd =

Diósd Orasch
- Town
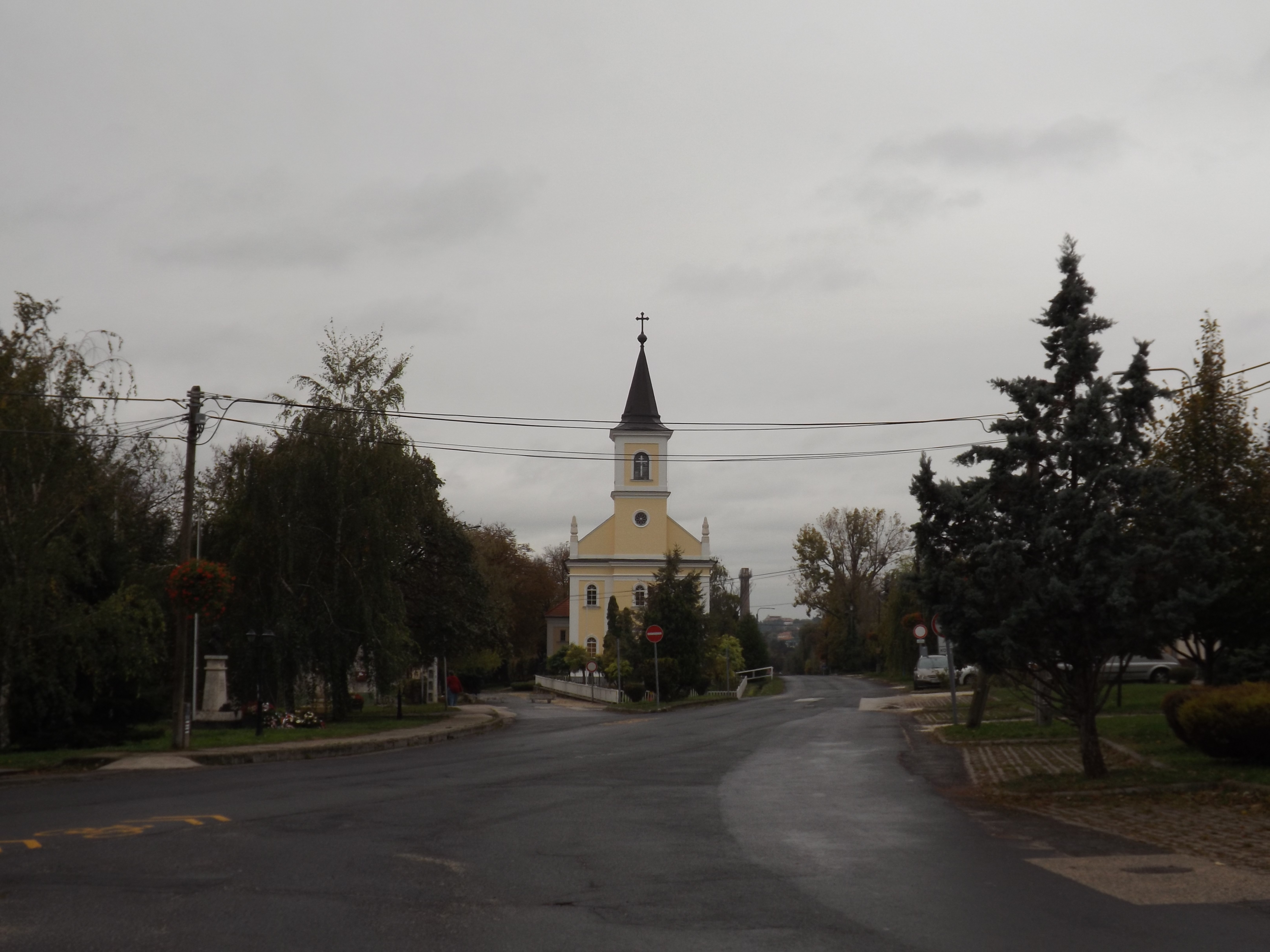

- Flag Coat of arms

- Location of Diósd
- Coordinates: 47°24′15″N 18°56′45″E
- Country: Hungary
- County: Pest
- District: Érd

Area
  - Total: 5.75 km^{2} (2.22 sq mi)

Population (2024)
  - Total: 11,637
  - Density: 1,724.52/km^{2} (4,466.5/sq mi)
- Time zone: UTC+1 (CET)
  - Summer (DST): UTC+2 (CEST)
- Postal code: 2049
- Area code: (+36) 23
- Website: diosd.hu

Diósd (German: Orasch) is a small town located between the larger cities of Budapest and Érd in the Budapest metropolitan area, Pest County, Hungary.

Though many residents commute to work to the capital city Budapest, the largest employers in the town are a manufacturing plant named New MGM Zrt., that produces ball bearings and tapered roller bearing for worldwide OEM customers and dealers, an Interspar grocery store, and the International Christian School of Budapest, a school that serves missionary families, expatriates, and Hungarians.

== Geography ==
The northern part of Diósd is located on the Tétényi plateau, which is a natural reserve. The ground has a very high concentration of limestone, and many uncommon plants can be found in this area. At least two Beehive Stones can be found in the forest in the northwest of Diósd. Two former limestone quarries also exist where locals often like to meet.

== History ==
Diósd was first mentioned in 1417 under king Sigismund.

Diósd is known in German by the name Orasch. The reason for this phenomenon is that after the Turkish invasion, the area was fully uninhabited. Swabians arrived from Southern Germany to repopulate the town and they were in majority there until the end of the second world war, when many of the Swabes were chased away. The Swabians in Diósd usually lived from making wine in wine cellars. Many of these cellars were made as big as normal houses to fit in the equipment used to make wine. Some of the wine cellars were longer than 100 meters. In the 1880s most of the vineyards were killed by Phylloxera. Since the cellars and storage houses became useless, they were converted into new residential houses. Most of these are still inhabited. Since most cellars still exist and many are located under the roads of the town, weight restrictions have to be taken seriously. After the vineyards died, the residentials planted peach trees. Almost all of these were finally destroyed in the 2000s when many new houses were built on the location of the peach orchards.

At the beginning of the 20th century Diósd was part of the Fejér county.

Since 2013, Diósd works in tight partnership with the German town Alsbach-Hähnlein in Hesse.

Until 1994, a radio station with a large number of antennas existed in the northern part of Diósd. Radio broadcasting had to be stopped because the M0 highway was built near the area. Today, only one antenna remains, and the radio station has been transformed into a radio and television museum.

Since the 1990s, many new houses were built in the town since people wanted to move near Budapest. Because of this, the house numbers had to be reordered by the management of the town. They were however not successful, and today many houses have two or three house numbers which lead to confusion of non-local people.

Diósd officially became a city on July 15, 2013.

== Traffic ==
The national road 7 runs through Diósd. It is known by locals as the "Balatoni út" (Balaton street) since if you travel on it, you eventually get to the lake Balaton. The opposite direction of this road leads to Budapest, where most of the residents of Diósd work. Budapest can also be reached by Bus from Diósd.

Diósd also has an exit on the M0 highway which opened in 1994 and runs on the northern and eastern edge of the town.

== Education ==
- Kindergarten
- Primary school (1st to 8th grade)
- International Christian School of Budapest

Thanks to the presence of ICSB, the town has an international (mostly Asian and American) population.

== Places of interest ==
- Museum for Radio and Television
- Church of St. Gellért
- Country House ("Tájház")
- Chapel of St. Anne (1772)
- Statue of Nepomuki St. János (18th century)
- Statue of St. Flórián (1852)
- Monument for the deads of the world War I. (1993)
- Friendship Monument and the Friendship Well
- two former limestone quarries
- Beehive Stones

== Twin towns – sister cities ==
Diósd is twinned with:

- Alsbach-Hähnlein, Germany
- Brâncovenești, Romania
- Cieszanów, Poland
- Keť, Slovakia
- Velyki Heivtsi, Ukraine

== Gallery ==
Coat of arms showing the chapel and a grape vine

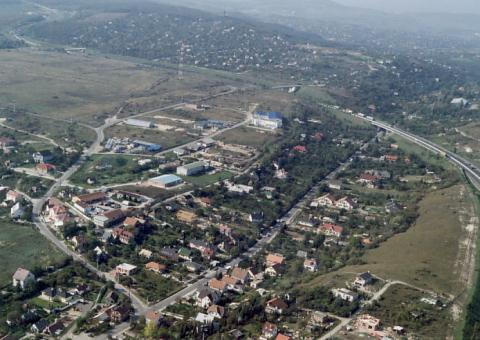
Northern part of Diósd, the M0 highway is in the distance. On the top left is the former area of the radio station

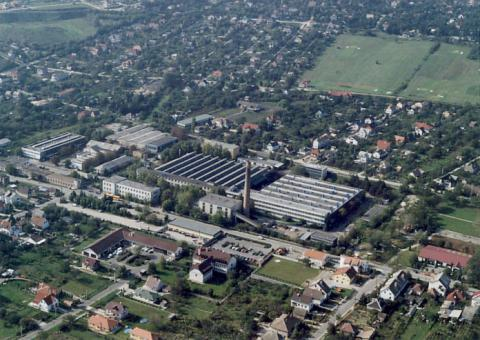
Ball bearing factory

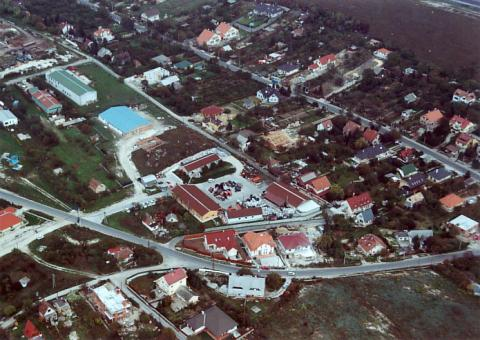
Northern part of Diósd with small factories and storage houses

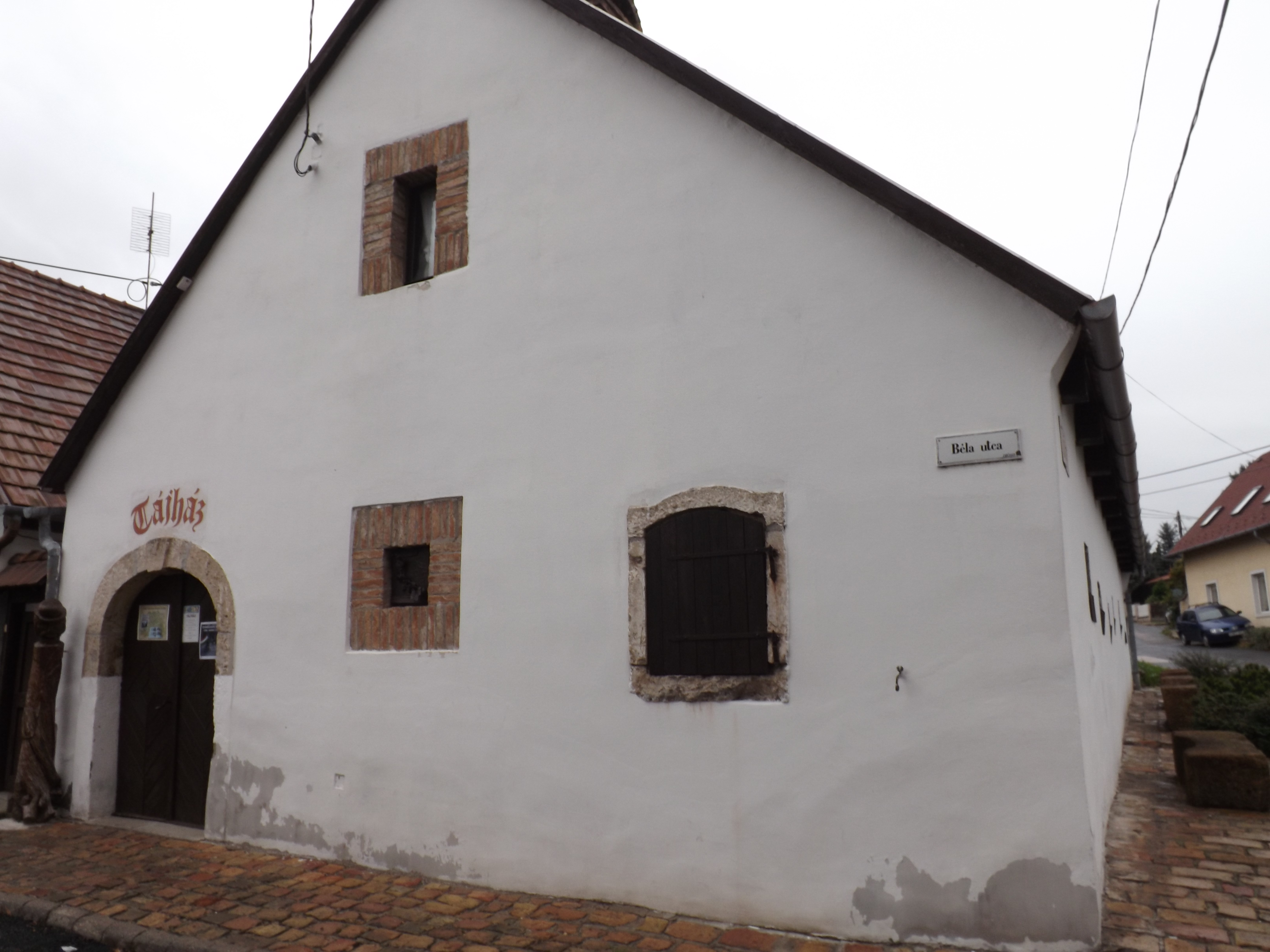
Tájház (Country House)

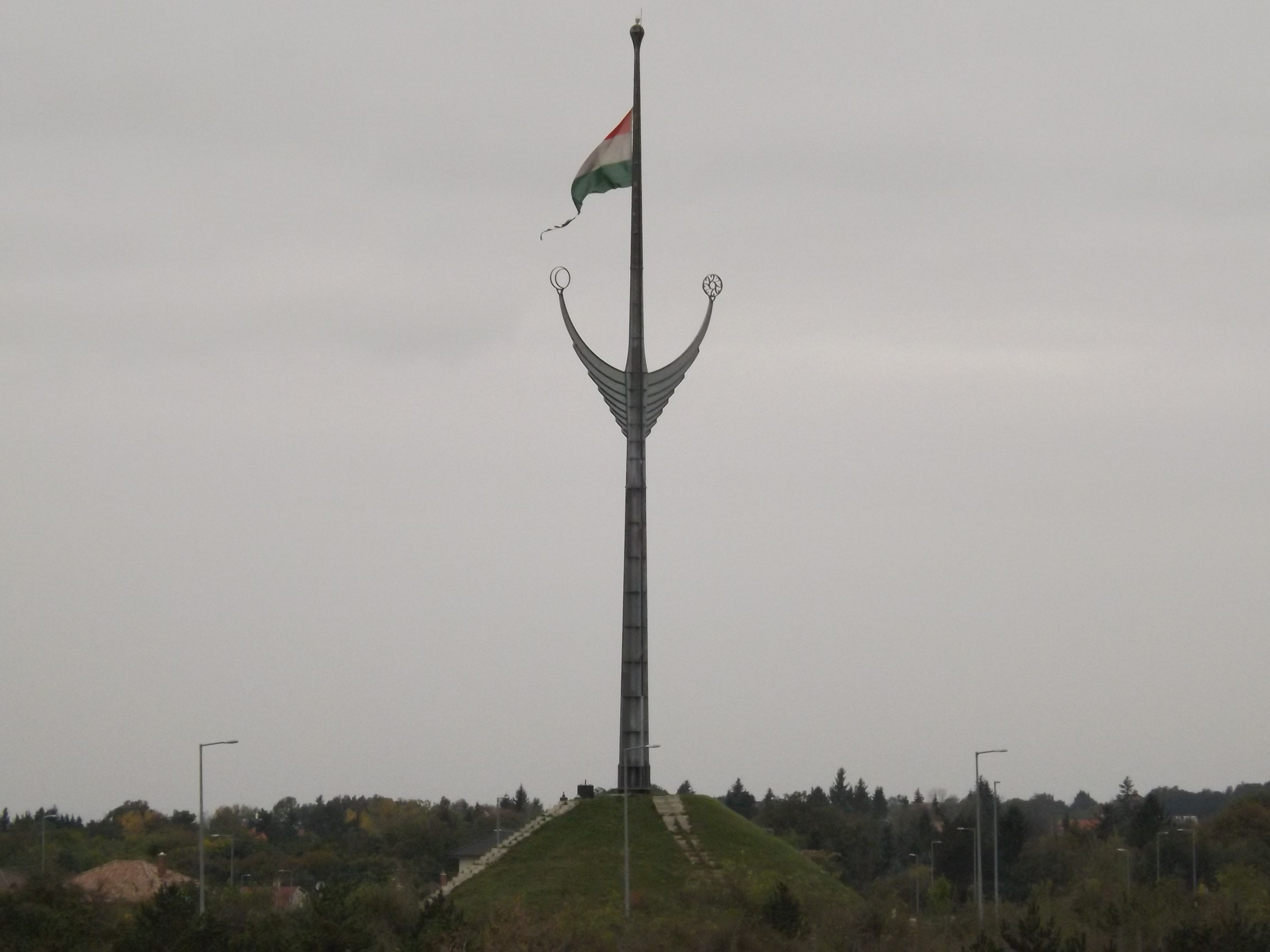
"Country Flag"

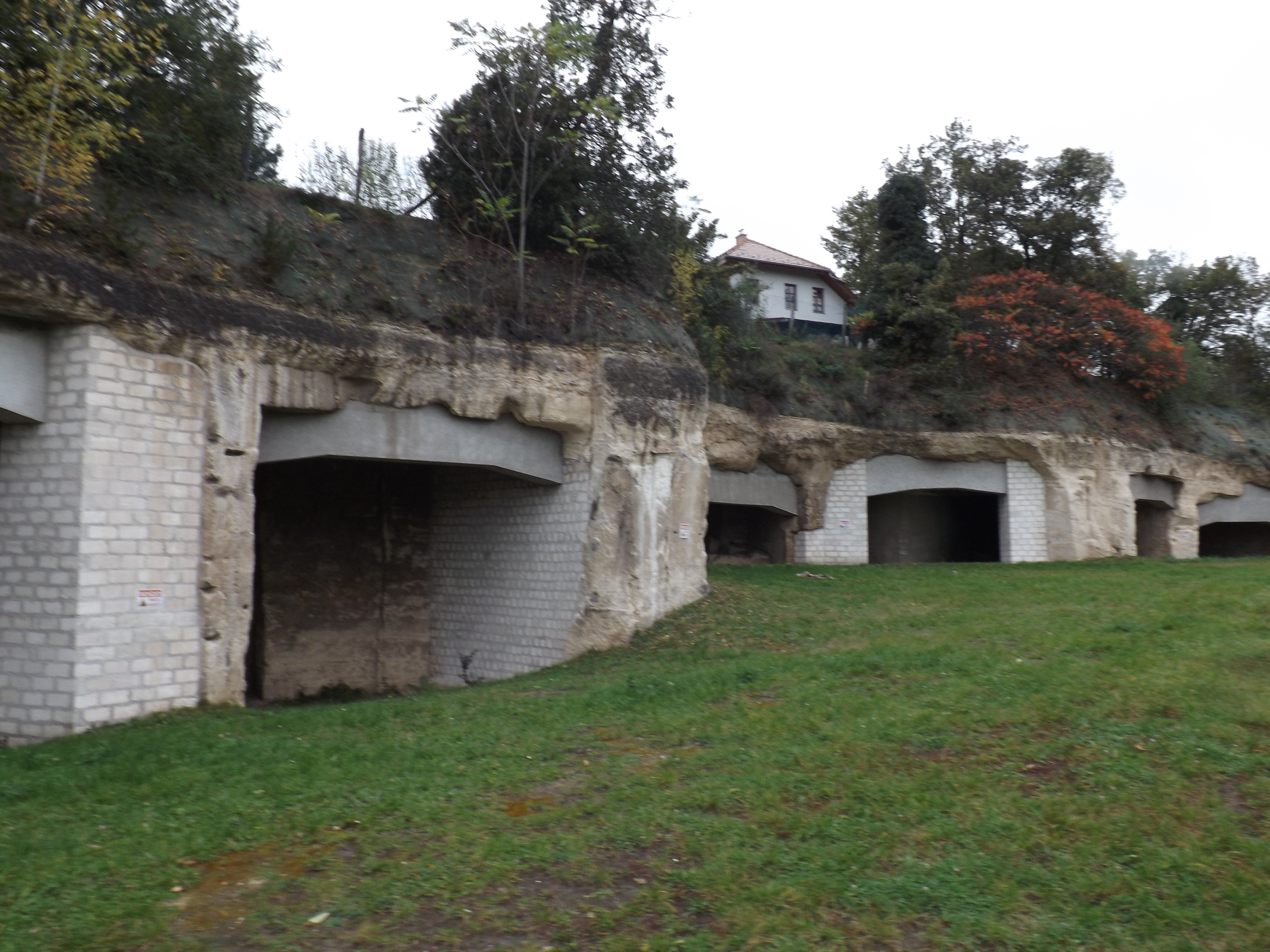
Upper quarry

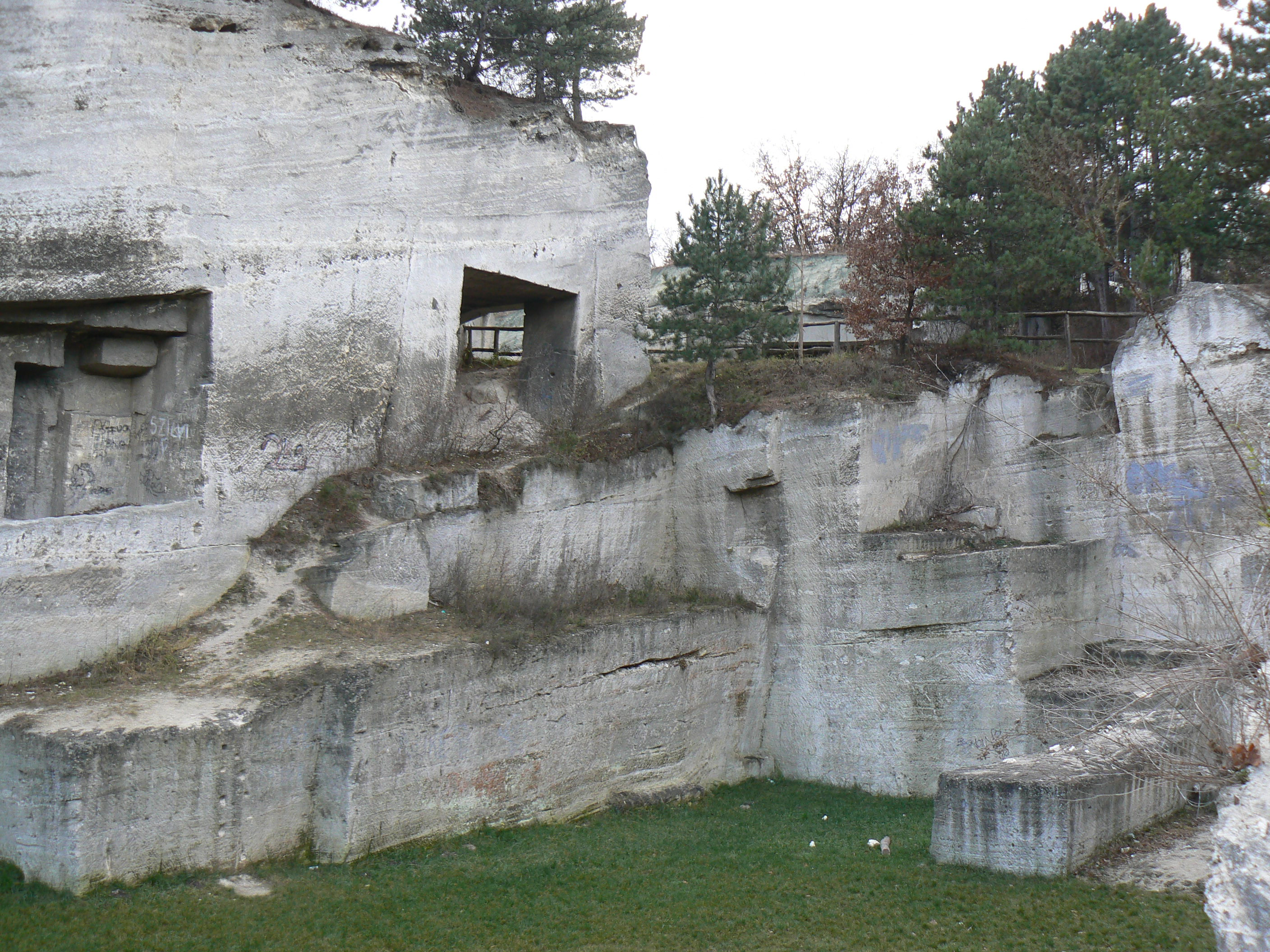
Lower quarry

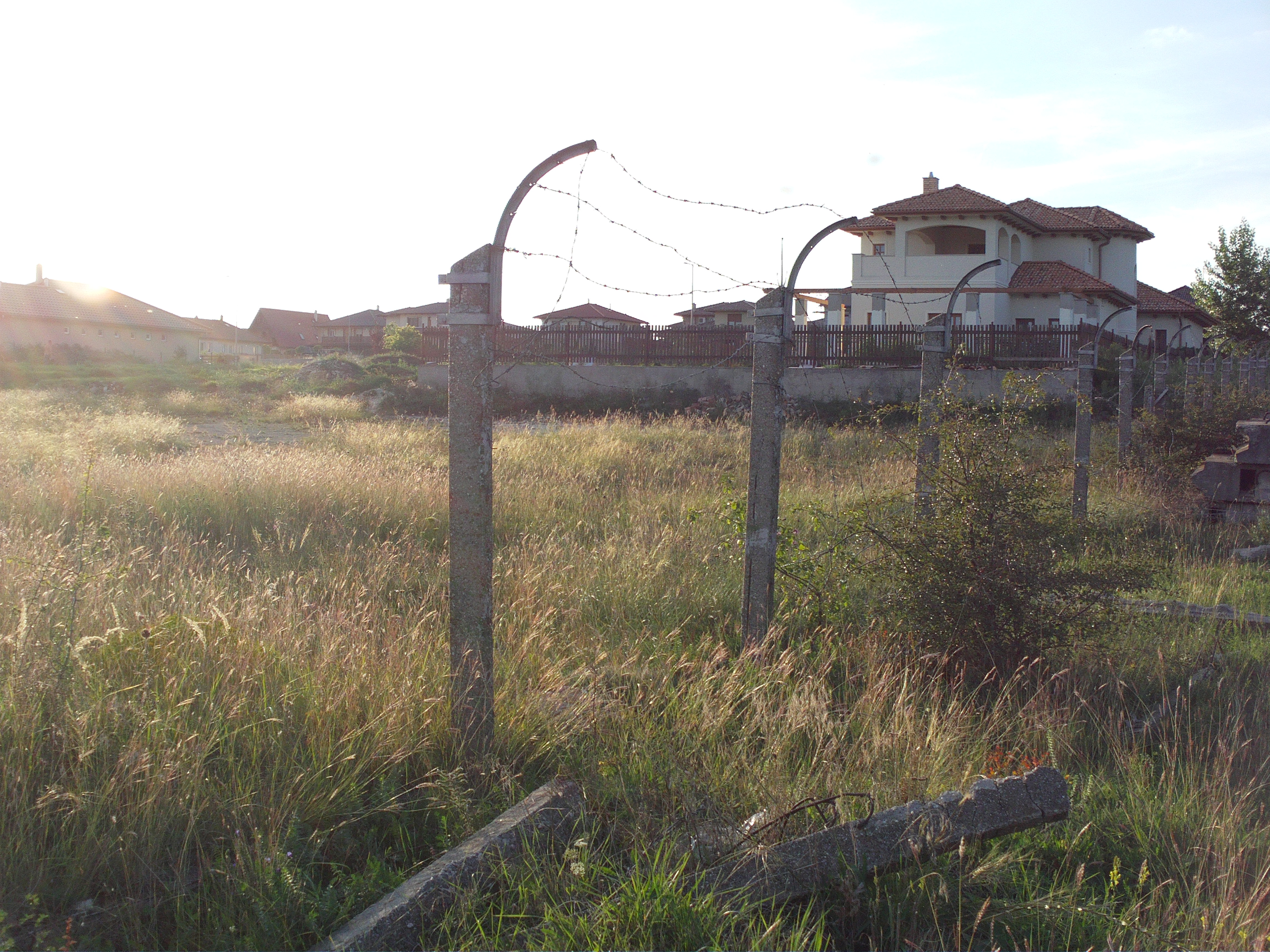
The old fence of the former radio station in Diósd, Hungary. The area has been transformed into a new residential area.

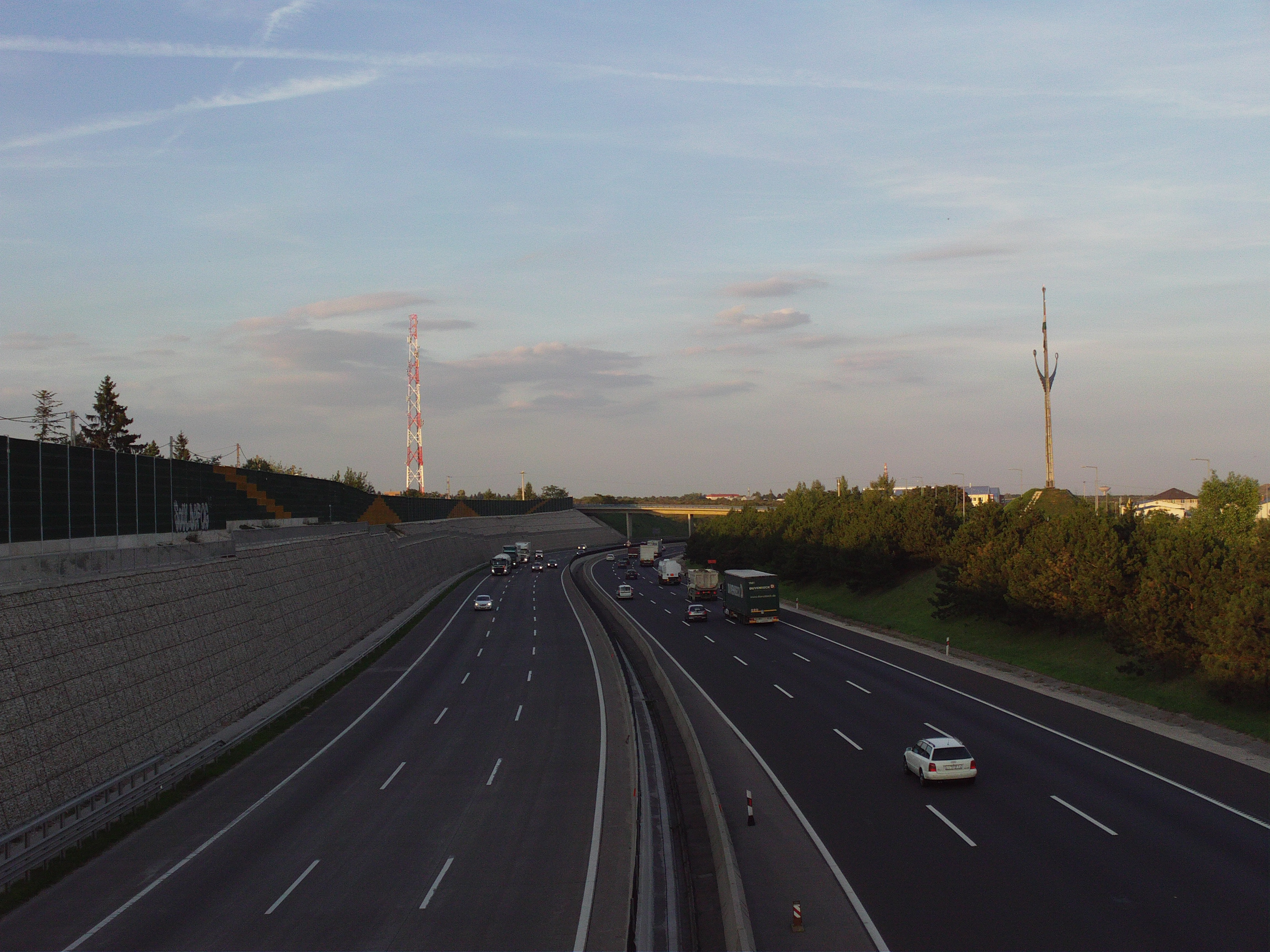
The M0 highway in the northern part of Diósd. On the right the new "Országzászlo" ("Country flag") is visible.

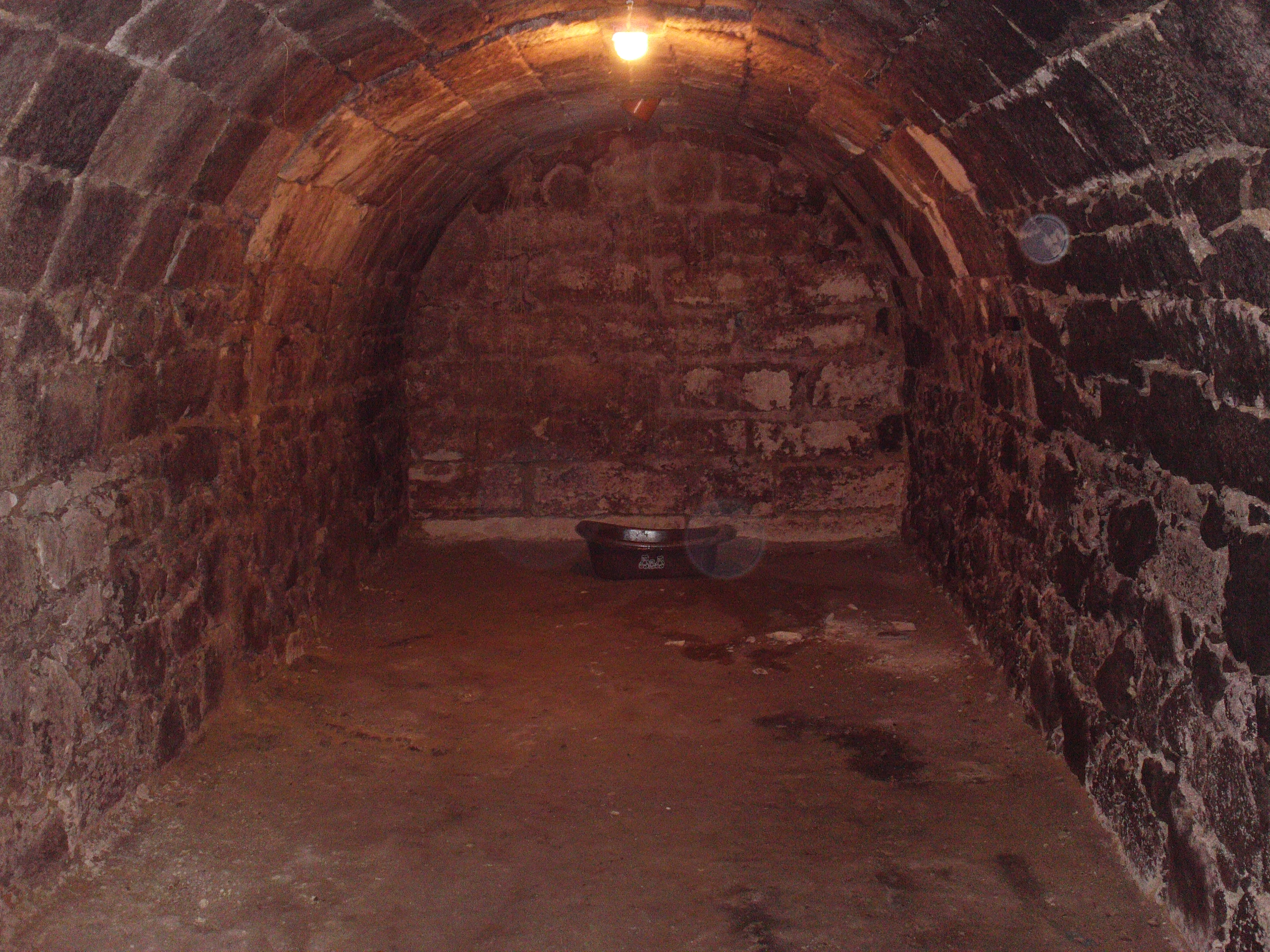
Former wine cellar in Diósd

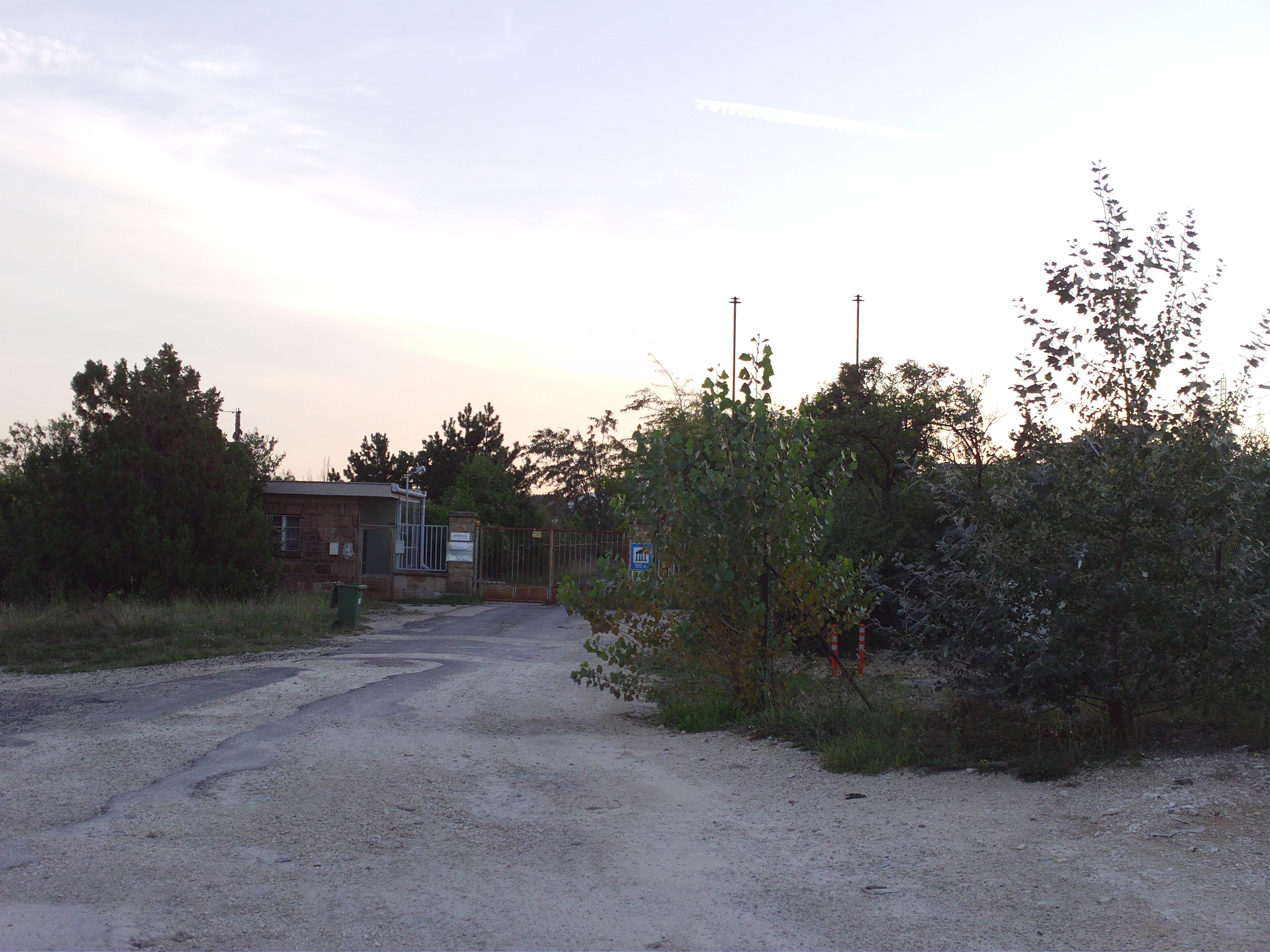
Entrance to the Radio and Television museum

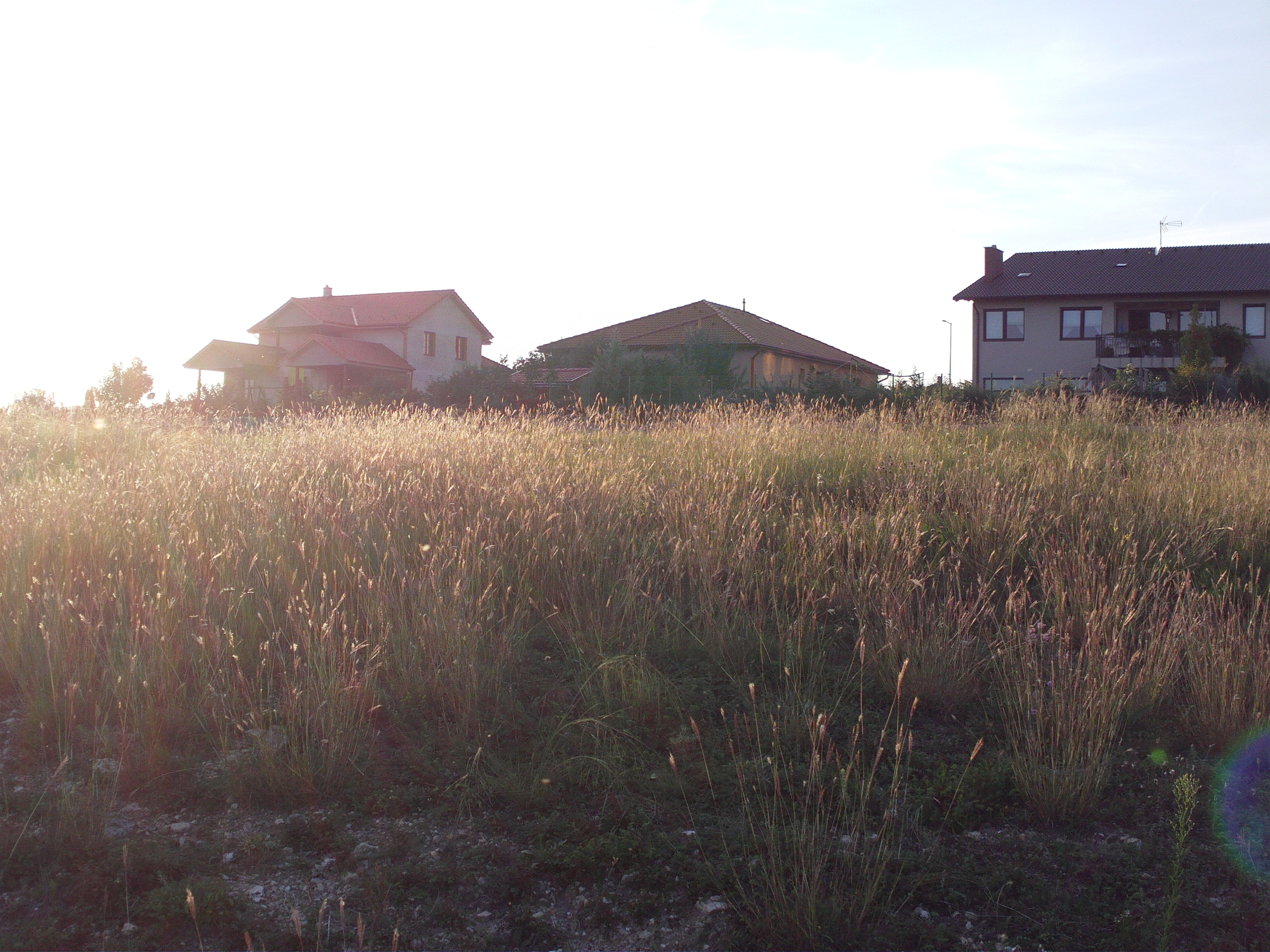
New houses in Diósd

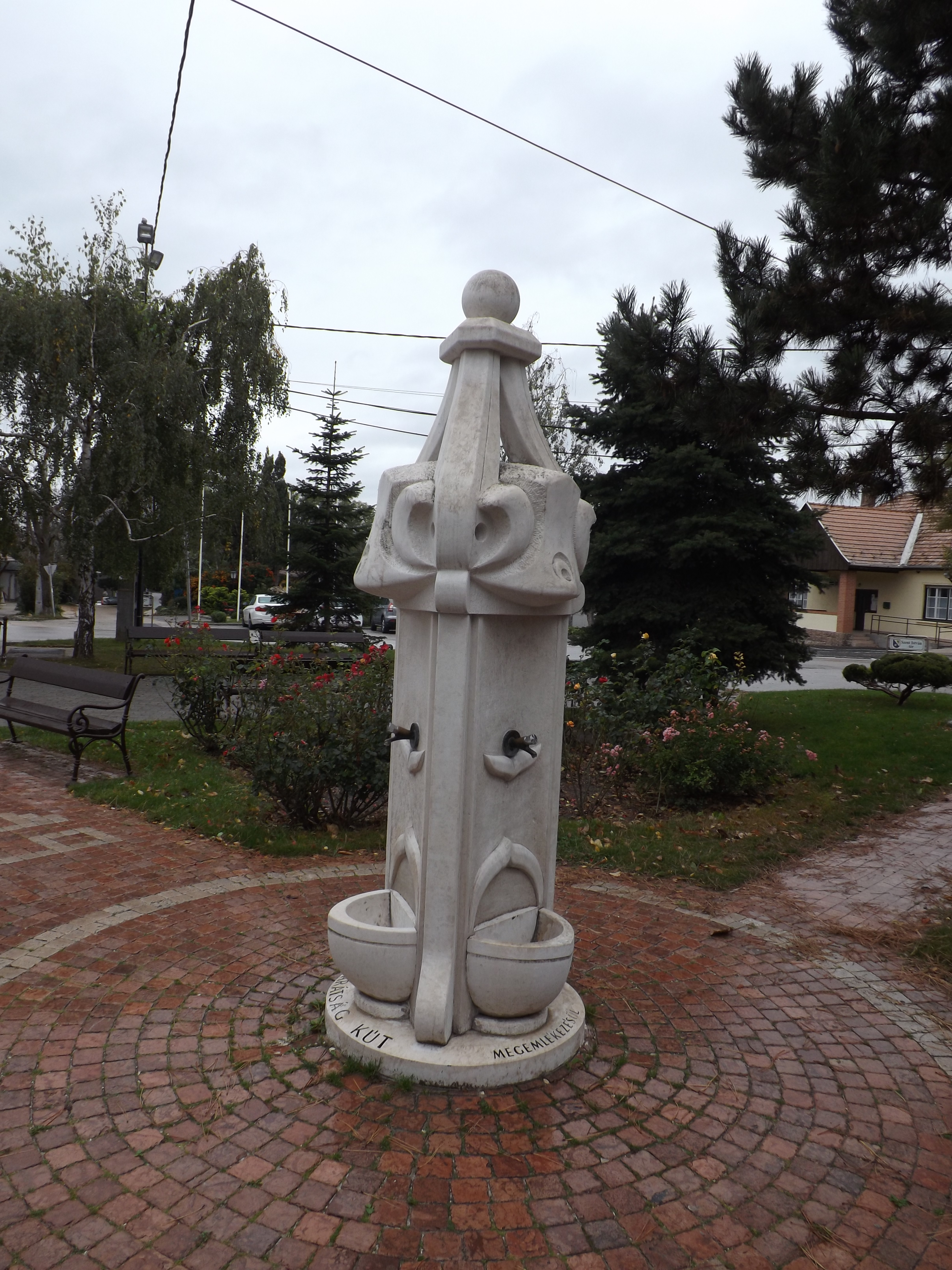
Friendship Well

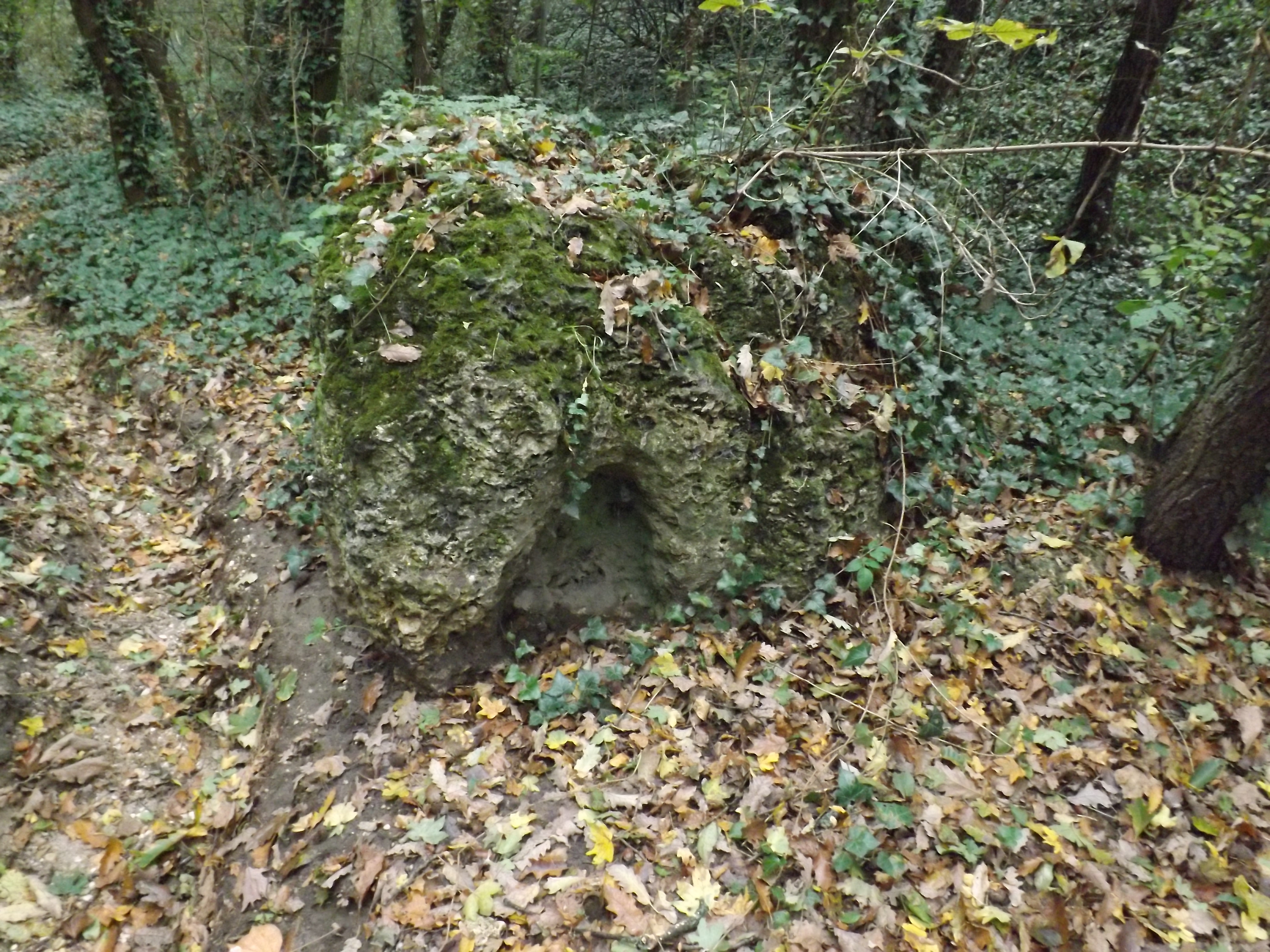
One of the Beehive Stones in Diósd

== See also ==
- Törökbálint (Großturwall)
- Érd (Hanselbeck)
