= Institute of Cost and Management Accountants =

Institute of Cost and Management Accountants may refer to:

- Institute of Cost and Management Accountants of Bangladesh
- Institute of Cost and Management Accountants of Pakistan
- Chartered Institute of Management Accountants, formerly the Institute of Cost and Management Accountants, a UK-based international organization
