= Douglas Cordier =

American politician (born 1953)

Member of the Montana House of Representatives from the 3rd district
- In office January 3, 2007 – January 5, 2009
- Preceded by: Dee Brown
- Succeeded by: Dee Brown

Personal details
- Born: Douglas E. Cordier; December 6, 1953 (age 72) Missoula, Montana, U.S.
- Party: Democratic
- Spouse: Char Cordier
- Children: 1
- Education: University of Montana (BA); Northern Montana College (MA)
- Profession: Politician, educator

Douglas E. Cordier (born December 6, 1953) is an American politician and educator who served a single term in the Montana House of Representatives, representing the 3rd legislative district of Montana from 2007 to 2009 as a Democrat.

== Early life and education ==
Cordier was born in Missoula, Montana on December 6, 1953. He attended the University of Montana, graduating with a Bachelor of Arts in 1976. Cordier subsequently attended Northern Montana College, graduating with a Master of Arts in 1989.

== Career ==
Prior to serving the Montana Legislature, Cordier was a teacher at Columbia Falls Junior High School from 1982 to 1992. In 1992, he began working as a counselor at Columbia Falls High School.

Cordier has also served as a board member of the Columbia Falls Chamber of Commerce and the Samaritan House Homeless Shelter. Additionally, Cordier has served as a member of the Montana Education Association, and as president of the Wildcat Athletic Endowment Association.

=== 2006 election ===
In 2006, Cordier was elected to a single term in the Montana House of Representatives to represent the 3rd legislative district of Montana as a Democrat. He won the Democratic primary with over 84% of the vote and the general election with just over 50% of the vote. Cordier was endorsed by John Parker, a candidate for Montana Attorney General in 2008.

During his time in office, Cordier served on the following standing committees.

- Judiciary
- Education
- Fish, Wildlife and Parks

Cordier's term began on January 3, 2007, and concluded on January 5, 2009. He was preceded and succeeded in this position by Dee Brown.

== Political positions ==
In 2007, Cordier received ratings of 100 or 100% from the following organizations.

- Montana Education Association-Montana Federation of Teachers
- Montana Conservation Voters
- Northern Plains Resource Council
- AFL-CIO - Montana
- Montana Public Employees Association

Cordier also received a B rating from the Montana Stockgrowers Association in 2007.

== Personal life ==
Cordier currently resides in Columbia Falls, Montana. He is married to Char Cordier, with whom he had one child.

Cordier is a member of the Knights of Columbus.

Montana House of Representatives
Preceded by Dee Brown	Member of the Montana House of Representatives from the 3rd district 2007–2009	Succeeded by Dee Brown
