= Alsbach-Hähnlein =

- Municipality
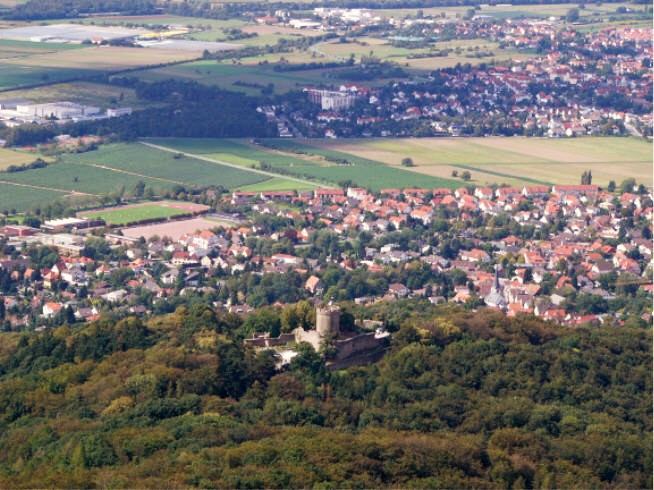
- The town of Alsbach-Hähnlein and Alsbach Castle seen from Melibokus hill

- Coat of arms

- Location of Alsbach-Hähnlein within Darmstadt-Dieburg district
- Interactive map of Alsbach-Hähnlein
- Location within Germany Location within Hesse
- Coordinates: 49°44′N 8°36′E
- Country: Germany
- State: Hesse
- Admin. region: Darmstadt
- District: Darmstadt-Dieburg

Government
  - Mayor (2019–25): Sebastian Bubenzer (CDU)

Area
  - Total: 15.78 km^{2} (6.09 sq mi)
- Elevation: 196 m (643 ft)

Population (2025-12-31)
  - Total: 9,240
  - Density: 586/km^{2} (1,520/sq mi)
- Time zone: UTC+01:00 (CET)
  - Summer (DST): UTC+02:00 (CEST)
- Postal codes: 64659–64665
- Dialling codes: 06257
- Vehicle registration: DA
- Website: www.alsbach-haehnlein.de

Alsbach-Hähnlein is a municipality in southern Hesse (Germany) in the district Darmstadt-Dieburg. It resulted from a merger of the two separate municipalities (Gemeinden) Alsbach and Hähnlein.

== Sister city ==
- Diósd, Hungary
