= Van Hiele model =

Theory of how students learn geometry

In mathematics education, the Van Hiele model is a theory that describes how students learn geometry. The theory originated in 1957 in the doctoral dissertations of Dina van Hiele-Geldof and Pierre van Hiele (wife and husband) at Utrecht University, in the Netherlands. The Soviets did research on the theory in the 1960s and integrated their findings into their curricula. American researchers did several large studies on the van Hiele theory in the late 1970s and early 1980s, concluding that students' low van Hiele levels made it difficult to succeed in proof-oriented geometry courses and advising better preparation at earlier grade levels. Pierre van Hiele published Structure and Insight in 1986, further describing his theory. The model has greatly influenced geometry curricula throughout the world through emphasis on analyzing properties and classification of shapes at early grade levels. In the United States, the theory has influenced the geometry strand of the Standards published by the National Council of Teachers of Mathematics and the Common Core Standards.

== Van Hiele levels ==
The student learns by rote to operate with [mathematical] relations that he does not understand, and of which he has not seen the origin…. Therefore the system of relations is an independent construction having no rapport with other experiences of the child. This means that the student knows only what has been taught to him and what has been deduced from it. He has not learned to establish connections between the system and the sensory world. He will not know how to apply what he has learned in a new situation. - Pierre van Hiele, 1959

The best known part of the van Hiele model are the five levels which the van Hieles postulated to describe how children learn to reason in geometry. Students cannot be expected to prove geometric theorems until they have built up an extensive understanding of the systems of relationships between geometric ideas. These systems cannot be learned by rote, but must be developed through familiarity by experiencing numerous examples and counterexamples, the various properties of geometric figures, the relationships between the properties, and how these properties are ordered. The five levels postulated by the van Hieles describe how students advance through this understanding.

The five van Hiele levels are sometimes misunderstood to be descriptions of how students understand shape classification, but the levels actually describe the way that students reason about shapes and other geometric ideas. Pierre van Hiele noticed that his students tended to "plateau" at certain points in their understanding of geometry and he identified these plateau points as levels. In general, these levels are a product of experience and instruction rather than age. This is in contrast to Piaget's theory of cognitive development, which is age-dependent. A child must have enough experiences (classroom or otherwise) with these geometric ideas to move to a higher level of sophistication. Through rich experiences, children can reach Level 2 in elementary school. Without such experiences, many adults (including teachers) remain in Level 1 all their lives, even if they take a formal geometry course in secondary school. The levels are as follows:

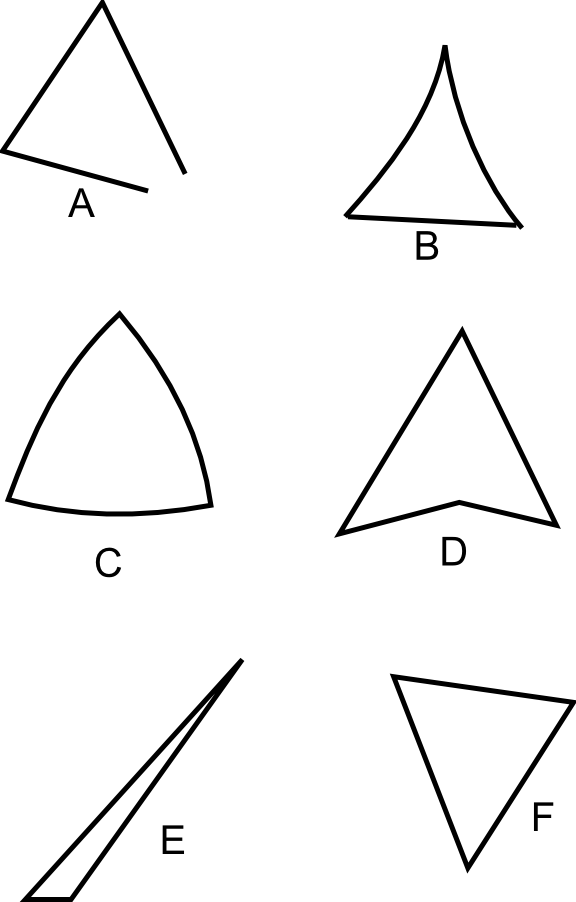
Children at Level 0 will often say all of these shapes are triangles, except E, which is too "skinny". They may say F is "upside down". Students at Level 1 will recognize that only E and F are valid triangles.

Level 0. Visualization: At this level, the focus of a child's thinking is on individual shapes, which the child is learning to classify by judging their holistic appearance. Children simply say, "That is a circle," usually without further description. Children identify prototypes of basic geometrical figures (triangle, circle, square). These visual prototypes are then used to identify other shapes. A shape is a circle because it looks like a sun; a shape is a rectangle because it looks like a door or a box; and so on. A square seems to be a different sort of shape than a rectangle, and a rhombus does not look like other parallelograms, so these shapes are classified completely separately in the child's mind. Children view figures holistically without analyzing their properties. If a shape does not sufficiently resemble its prototype, the child may reject the classification. Thus, children at this stage might balk at calling a thin, wedge-shaped triangle (with sides 1, 20, 20 or sides 20, 20, 39) a "triangle", because it's so different in shape from an equilateral triangle, which is the usual prototype for "triangle". If the horizontal base of the triangle is on top and the opposing vertex below, the child may recognize it as a triangle, but claim it is "upside down". Shapes with rounded or incomplete sides may be accepted as "triangles" if they bear a holistic resemblance to an equilateral triangle. Squares are called "diamonds" and not recognized as squares if their sides are oriented at 45° to the horizontal. Children at this level often believe something is true based on a single example.

Level 1. Analysis: At this level, the shapes become bearers of their properties. The objects of thought are classes of shapes, which the child has learned to analyze as having properties. A person at this level might say, "A square has 4 equal sides and 4 equal angles. Its diagonals are congruent and perpendicular, and they bisect each other." The properties are more important than the appearance of the shape. If a figure is sketched on the blackboard and the teacher claims it is intended to have congruent sides and angles, the students accept that it is a square, even if it is poorly drawn. Properties are not yet ordered at this level. Children can discuss the properties of the basic figures and recognize them by these properties, but generally do not allow categories to overlap because they understand each property in isolation from the others. For example, they will still insist that "a square is not a rectangle." (They may introduce extraneous properties to support such beliefs, such as defining a rectangle as a shape with one pair of sides longer than the other pair of sides.) Children begin to notice many properties of shapes, but do not see the relationships between the properties; therefore they cannot reduce the list of properties to a concise definition with necessary and sufficient conditions. They usually reason inductively from several examples, but cannot yet reason deductively because they do not understand how the properties of shapes are related.

Level 2. Abstraction: At this level, properties are ordered. The objects of thought are geometric properties, which the student has learned to connect deductively. The student understands that properties are related and one set of properties may imply another property. Students can reason with simple arguments about geometric figures. A student at this level might say, "Isosceles triangles are symmetric, so their base angles must be equal." Learners recognize the relationships between types of shapes. They recognize that all squares are rectangles, but not all rectangles are squares, and they understand why squares are a type of rectangle based on an understanding of the properties of each. They can tell whether it is possible or not to have a rectangle that is, for example, also a rhombus. They understand necessary and sufficient conditions and can write concise definitions. However, they do not yet understand the intrinsic meaning of deduction. They cannot follow a complex argument, understand the place of definitions, or grasp the need for axioms, so they cannot yet understand the role of formal geometric proofs.

Level 3. Deduction: Students at this level understand the meaning of deduction. The object of thought is deductive reasoning (simple proofs), which the student learns to combine to form a system of formal proofs (Euclidean geometry). Learners can construct geometric proofs at a secondary school level and understand their meaning. They understand the role of undefined terms, definitions, axioms and theorems in Euclidean geometry. However, students at this level believe that axioms and definitions are fixed, rather than arbitrary, so they cannot yet conceive of non-Euclidean geometry. Geometric ideas are still understood as objects in the Euclidean plane.

Level 4. Rigor: At this level, geometry is understood at the level of a mathematician. Students understand that definitions are arbitrary and need not actually refer to any concrete realization. The object of thought is deductive geometric systems, for which the learner compares axiomatic systems. Learners can study non-Euclidean geometries with understanding. People can understand the discipline of geometry and how it differs philosophically from non-mathematical studies.

American researchers renumbered the levels as 1 to 5 so that they could add a "Level 0" which described young children who could not identify shapes at all. Both numbering systems are still in use. Some researchers also give different names to the levels.

== Properties of the levels ==
The van Hiele levels have five properties:

1. Fixed sequence: the levels are hierarchical. Students cannot "skip" a level. The van Hieles claim that much of the difficulty experienced by geometry students is due to being taught at the Deduction level when they have not yet achieved the Abstraction level.

2. Adjacency: properties which are intrinsic at one level become extrinsic at the next. (The properties are there at the Visualization level, but the student is not yet consciously aware of them until the Analysis level. Properties are in fact related at the Analysis level, but students are not yet explicitly aware of the relationships.)

3. Distinction: each level has its own linguistic symbols and network of relationships. The meaning of a linguistic symbol is more than its explicit definition; it includes the experiences the speaker associates with the given symbol. What may be "correct" at one level is not necessarily correct at another level. At Level 0 a square is something that looks like a box. At Level 2 a square is a special type of rectangle. Neither of these is a correct description of the meaning of "square" for someone reasoning at Level 1. If the student is simply handed the definition and its associated properties, without being allowed to develop meaningful experiences with the concept, the student will not be able to apply this knowledge beyond the situations used in the lesson.

4. Separation: a teacher who is reasoning at one level speaks a different "language" from a student at a lower level, preventing understanding. When a teacher speaks of a "square" she or he means a special type of rectangle. A student at Level 0 or 1 will not have the same understanding of this term. The student does not understand the teacher, and the teacher does not understand how the student is reasoning, frequently concluding that the student's answers are simply "wrong". The van Hieles believed this property was one of the main reasons for failure in geometry. Teachers believe they are expressing themselves clearly and logically, but their Level 3 or 4 reasoning is not understandable to students at lower levels, nor do the teachers understand their students' thought processes. Ideally, the teacher and students need shared experiences behind their language.

5. Attainment: The van Hieles recommended five phases for guiding students from one level to another on a given topic:

- Information or inquiry: students get acquainted with the material and begin to discover its structure. Teachers present a new idea and allow the students to work with the new concept. By having students experience the structure of the new concept in a similar way, they can have meaningful conversations about it. (A teacher might say, "This is a rhombus. Construct some more rhombi on your paper.")
- Guided or directed orientation: students do tasks that enable them to explore implicit relationships. Teachers propose activities of a fairly guided nature that allow students to become familiar with the properties of the new concept which the teacher desires them to learn. (A teacher might ask, "What happens when you cut out and fold the rhombus along a diagonal? the other diagonal?" and so on, followed by discussion.)
- Explicitation: students express what they have discovered and vocabulary is introduced. The students' experiences are linked to shared linguistic symbols. The van Hieles believe it is more profitable to learn vocabulary after students have had an opportunity to become familiar with the concept. The discoveries are made as explicit as possible. (A teacher might say, "Here are the properties we have noticed and some associated vocabulary for the things you discovered. Let's discuss what these mean.")
- Free orientation: students do more complex tasks enabling them to master the network of relationships in the material. They know the properties being studied, but need to develop fluency in navigating the network of relationships in various situations. This type of activity is much more open-ended than the guided orientation. These tasks will not have set procedures for solving them. Problems may be more complex and require more free exploration to find solutions. (A teacher might say, "How could you construct a rhombus given only two of its sides?" and other problems for which students have not learned a fixed procedure.)
- Integration: students summarize what they have learned and commit it to memory. The teacher may give the students an overview of everything they have learned. It is important that the teacher not present any new material during this phase, but only a summary of what has already been learned. The teacher might also give an assignment to remember the principles and vocabulary learned for future work, possibly through further exercises. (A teacher might say, "Here is a summary of what we have learned. Write this in your notebook and do these exercises for homework.") Supporters of the van Hiele model point out that traditional instruction often involves only this last phase, which explains why students do not master the material.

For Dina van Hiele-Geldof's doctoral dissertation, she conducted a teaching experiment with 12-year-olds in a Montessori secondary school in the Netherlands. She reported that by using this method she was able to raise students' levels from Level 0 to 1 in 20 lessons and from Level 1 to 2 in 50 lessons.

== Research ==
Using van Hiele levels as the criterion, almost half of geometry students are placed in a course in which their chances of being successful are only 50-50. — Zalman Usiskin, 1982

Researchers found that the van Hiele levels of American students are low. European researchers have found similar results for European students. Many, perhaps most, American students do not achieve the Deduction level even after successfully completing a proof-oriented high school geometry course, probably because material is learned by rote, as the van Hieles claimed. This appears to be because American high school geometry courses assume students are already at least at Level 2, ready to move into Level 3, whereas many high school students are still at Level 1, or even Level 0. See the Fixed Sequence property above.

=== Criticism and modifications of the theory ===
The levels are discontinuous, as defined in the properties above, but researchers have debated as to just how discrete the levels actually are. Studies have found that many children reason at multiple levels, or intermediate levels, which appears to be in contradiction to the theory. Children also advance through the levels at different rates for different concepts, depending on their exposure to the subject. They may therefore reason at one level for certain shapes, but at another level for other shapes.

Some researchers have found that many children at the Visualization level do not reason in a completely holistic fashion, but may focus on a single attribute, such as the equal sides of a square or the roundness of a circle. They have proposed renaming this level the syncretic level. Other modifications have also been suggested, such as defining sub-levels between the main levels, though none of these modifications have yet gained popularity.
