= DHI =

DHI may refer to:

- Dhi (Hindu thought), a concept
- DHI (company), a water environment research, consulting and software organisation from Denmark
- DHI Group, Inc, owner of employment websites
- Deutsches Historisches Institut, the German Historical Institutes present in several international cities
- Dhangarhi Airport (IATA airport code), Dhangarhi, Nepal
- Diffuse horizontal irradiance
- Dignitatis Humanae Institute, a Catholic-inspired NGO based in Rome
- Dhimal language (ISO 639-3 language code), a Sino-Tibetan language of Nepal
- EMD DHI, an experimental diesel-hydraulic railroad locomotive
- 5,6-dihydroxyindole, a chemical compound constituent of melanin

== See also ==
- Dhee (disambiguation)
