= Di (surname) =

Dí is the pinyin romanization of the Chinese surname Chinese: 狄 (Dí).

It was listed 108th among the Song-era Hundred Family Surnames.

== Romanization ==
狄 is often anglicized as "Dee".

== Distribution ==
Di no longer appears among the 100 most common names in mainland China or on Taiwan. A 2013 study found it to be the 314th-most common name, being shared by 168,000 people or 0.013% of the population, with the province with the most being Jiangsu.

It is also quite uncommon in the United States: there were fewer than 100 Dis during the 1990 census and while the number in the year 2000 surpassed that it was still ranked 54,296th among the 150,000 or so listed surnames.

== Origin ==
狄 is composed of the radicals for "animal" (犭) and "fire" (火) and was used to describe barbarian tribes north of the original zhongguo.

Its Old Chinese pronunciation has been reconstructed as *lˤek and its Middle Chinese one as Dek.

== People with the surname ==
- Di Renjie (Chinese: 狄仁傑, 630–700), the Tang-dynasty official notable for serving Wu Zetian's Zhou state, better known as "Judge Dee"
- Di Qing (Chinese: 狄青, 1008–1057), formerly romanized as Ti Ch'ing, was a military general of the Northern Song dynasty.
- Di Ying (Chinese: 狄鶯; born 1962) is a Taiwanese actress (Di was originally the stage name of her father, whose birth name was 伊適杰)

=== Stagename ===
- Tina Leung Kwok-hing (Chinese: 梁幗馨; died 31 March 2010), also known by her stage name of Tina Ti or Di Na (Chinese: 狄娜), a Hong Kong actress

== See also ==
- Chinese name
- List of common Chinese surnames
- The Hundred Family Surnames
