= Directorate of National Consumer Rights Protection =

Quasi-judicial government department in Bangladesh

Directorate of National Consumers' Right Protection
- জাতীয় ভোক্তা-অধিকার সংরক্ষণ অধিদপ্তর

Agency overview
- Formed: 2009; 17 years ago
- Jurisdiction: Government of Bangladesh
- Headquarters: Dhaka, Bangladesh; 23.751005°N 90.395279°E
- Agency executive: Director General
- Parent department: Ministry of Commerce
- Website: Directorate of National Consumers' Right Protection

Directorate of National Consumers' Right Protection (Bengali: জাতীয় ভোক্তা-অধিকার সংরক্ষণ অধিদপ্তর) is a quasi-judicial government department responsible for hearing and addressing consumer complaints over goods and services. It is headquartered in Dhaka with local offices in every divisional cities of Bangladesh.

== History ==
The Directorate of National Consumers' Right Protection (DNCRP) founded in 2009 through the Consumer Rights Protection Act, 2009. The act also created the supplementary National Consumer Right Protection Council. The Directorate of National Consumers' Right Protection is led by a Director General. Consumers can file complaint against business with the Directorate of National Consumer's Right Protection. The directorate after an investigation can place fines on the company if they find against the company. The directorate will give 25 percent of the fine to the complaint. The aggrieved consumer cannot take legal action against the responsible company without the explicit permission of the Directorate, which has drawn criticism from consumer advocacy groups that the law is actually against the interests of the consumers.
