= International Christian School of Budapest =

Location
- Ifjúság Way 11; Diósd, Pest, 2049; Hungary; 47°24′33″N 18°57′16″E

Information
- Other name: ICSB
- Type: Private international school
- Religious affiliation: Christian
- Established: 1994
- Director: Kristi Hiltibran
- Grades: K–12
- Gender: Co-educational
- Enrollment: 275 (2024)
- Mascot: Bulldog
- Accreditations: ACSI, MSA-CESS
- Affiliation: WIDA International School Consortium
- Website: www.icsbudapest.org

International Christian School of Budapest (ICSB) is a private, Christian, co-educational international school in Diósd, Pest, Hungary. It was established in 1994 and is the only ACT test center in Hungary. It is known to be a popular choice among Chinese parents.

== History ==
The International Christian School of Budapest was established in 1994 and was first accredited by the Middle States Association Commissions on Elementary and Secondary Schools (MSA-CESS) in 1999. In 2016, it was one of 23 international schools to earn "reaccreditation, the gold standard for measuring and advancing school improvement", the top recognition from MSA-CESS.

The East-West Church and Ministry Report wrote in 1999 that multiple Christian missions have relocated to Budapest because of its strategic location halfway between the Baltic and Adriatic Seas, but added, "One of the major factors for missions relocating regional offices to Budapest has been the development of the International Christian School of Budapest, an accredited program (grades 1-12) with 300 students."

== Curriculum ==
The school's curriculum is primarily US-based. In 2019–20, the school offered eight Advanced Placement courses (Biology, Calculus AB, English Literature and Composition, Human Geography, Macroeconomics and Microeconomics, Physics 1, and Statistics). In recent years, it has also offered Studio Art: 2-D (now known as 2-D Art and Design) and European History.

As of August 2018, it is the only ACT test center in Hungary.

== Athletics ==
The school offers a variety of sports throughout the year. In the fall there is volleyball for high school and soccer is offered to both middle school and high school. In the winter there is basketball for high school and middle school. A recent addition to the sports program is the swim club which is only offered to high schoolers. During the winter sports season ICSB hosts a big basketball tournament called Winter Classic. Basketball teams from around Europe may be invited and it is a can't-miss event. In the springtime ICSB offers track & field for both middle school and high school as well as volleyball for middle school. Throughout the sports seasons, athletes compete with other school teams in Budapest. They also participate in big tournaments called the Danube Valley Athletic Conference (DVAC).
