= Dhee =

Dhee may refer to:

- Dhee (film), 2007 Indian Telugu-language film by Srinu Vytla
- Dhee (singer), Tamil singer from Australia
- Dhee (TV series), Indian television show

== See also ==
- Dee (disambiguation)
- DHI (disambiguation)
