= Business Promotion Council =

Bangladeshi government trade body

Business Promotion Council (BPC)
- বিজনেস প্রমোশন কাউন্সিল (বিপিসি)
- Seal of Business Promotion Council
- Location: Dhaka, Bangladesh
- Key people: Shubhashish Bose, Chairperson
- Parent organization: Ministry of Commerce (Bangladesh)
- Website: www.bpc.org.bd

Business Promotion Council (BPC) is a council that promotes the export of specific products in Bangladesh. Business Promotion Council is an undertaking of the Ministry of Commerce, and is responsible for the task of export diversification through capacity building and coordinating the efforts of six sector-based councils.

== Sector-based councils ==
- Agro Products Business Promotion Council (APBPC)
- Fishery Products Business Promotion Councils(FPBPC)
- Medicinal Plants and Herbal Products Business Promotion Council (MPHPBPC)
- Light Engineering Product Business Promotion Council (LEPBPC)
- Leather Sector Business Promotion Council (LSBPC)
- ICT Business Promotion Council (IBPC)
