= Harry Klock =

American politician

Member of the Montana House of Representatives from the 83rd district
- In office January 3, 2005 – January 7, 2013
- Preceded by: Dee L. Brown
- Succeeded by: Wylie Galt

Personal details
- Born: March 29, 1948 (age 78)
- Party: Republican
- Education: Montana State University

Harry Klock is a Republican member of the Montana Legislature. He was elected to House District 83 which represents a portion of the Lewis and Clark County area.
