= Trading Corporation of Bangladesh =

Bangladeshi organization

- TCB logo
- Abbreviation: TCB
- Formation: 1 January 1972
- Type: Autonomous Organization
- Legal status: Corporation
- Headquarters: Dhaka, Bangladesh
- Location: 1 Kawran Bazar, Dhaka 1215
- Region served: Bangladesh
- Official language: Bengali
- Chairman: Brigadier General Mohammad Foyshol Azad, psc
- Main organ: Board
- Parent organization: Ministry of Commerce
- Website: Trading Corporation of Bangladesh

The Trading Corporation Of Bangladesh (TCB) (Bengali: ট্রেডিং কর্পোরেশন অব বাংলাদেশ (টিসিবি)) is a wing of the Commerce Ministry of Bangladesh to deal with different trades and businesses. Currently the chairman of TCB is Brigadier General Mohammad Foyshol Azad, psc.

== Mission ==
The main mission of TCB is to maintain a buffer stock of some selected essential commodities add sell them to stabilize the market price.

== History ==
The Trading Corporation of Bangladesh (TCB) was established on 1 January 1972, to ensure adequate supply of essential commodities and industrial raw materials in the volatile economic condition during the post-independence period. TCB was established in 1972 to tackle the shortage of food and resources in Bangladesh following the Bangladesh Liberation war in 1971. Following the establishment, TCB started its operation through the import and export of essential commodities and many other products. At present, the Readymade Garment sector earns a huge amount of foreign exchange through exports where TCB is the pioneer. TCB was the first organization to export readymade garments from Bangladesh. Later, TCB's activities were curtailed due to the introduction of the free-market economy. However, the present government has strengthened TCB by taking various effective measures which include increasing its manpower and warehousing capacity. Besides, TCB has continued its activities of keeping the supply and price of essential commodities stable within the country in line with the government's policy.

== Achievements ==
TCB's activities have increased manifold in recent years. TCB is currently selling products to the marginalized population of the country at affordable prices throughout the year which on the one hand helps to keep the prices stable and on the other hand reduces the living expenses of low-income citizens. It is playing an important role in achieving the country's growth and improving the quality of life, including poverty alleviation. As a result, TCB has made a significant contribution to ensuring food security, achieving the country's economic growth, and building hunger and poverty-free Bangladesh.

The present government has taken several effective initiatives, including increasing the institutional and warehousing capacity of TCB. The Ordinance that facilitated the formation of TCB i.e. PO 68/1972 has been amended to include the issue of "Building Buffer stock by collecting essential commodities". The authorized capital of TCB has been increased from BDT 05 (Five) crore to BDT 1000 (One thousand) crore.

As part of strengthening the TCB which was established by the Father of the Nation, the present government has set up 4 new regional offices (Barisal, Rangpur, Moulvibazar, and Mymensingh) in order to expand activities of TCB across the country. Besides, 4 new camp offices (Madaripur, Cumilla, Jhenaidah, and Bogura) have been set up in 2020. Moreover, the Hon'ble High Court Division has directed to extend the sales activities of TCB down to the Upazila level. Following the directive, the sales activities of TCB have already been extended down to the Upazila level. More than 700 new dealers have been appointed down to Upazila level to implement the expanded activities more vigorously. This has increased the number of active dealers and made the activities of TCB more dynamic. Besides, a large number of people in the country, including the marginalized population, are enjoying the benefits of purchasing TCB's essential commodities at an affordable price. TCB had 9,560 MT warehousing capacity in FY 2008-09. During the tenure of the present government, 40,000 square feet warehouse has been constructed in Chattogram as part of strengthening TCB. At present, TCB's warehousing capacity is 14,354 MT. This has increased TCB's capacity for emergency stockpiling. Implementation of the project worth BDT 25 crore is also underway for constructing three warehouses at Chattogram, Sylhet, and Rangpur regional offices to further increase the capacity of TCB's warehouses. An increase in TCB's warehousing capacity has resulted in the increase of TCB's capacity of market presence. As a result, the government can control the rise in the price of essential commodities more effectively and play a role in meeting the demands of the people.

As part of fulfilling the dream of building a ‘Digital Bangladesh’, TCB is inviting tenders in the e-GP (Electronic Government Procurement) system. Wi-Fi and video conferencing system have been introduced. Dealers are being apprised regularly about goods allocation of different installments through mobile SMS. Online application for dealer enlistment has been introduced. Disposal of files through an e-filing (Electronic Filing) system has also been introduced. Market prices of essential commodities are being quickly processed through software and are published on TCB's website on a daily basis.

An agreement was signed with Canada's Saskatchewan Trade and Export Partnership (STEP) as part of strengthening bilateral, regional, and international relations with all countries. In order to procure goods at the appropriate time to keep the price of goods stable, an agreement has been signed with the STC of India through the Ministry of Commerce. An MOU was also signed with the STC of Nepal on 06/03/2020. In the recent past, there has been a shortage of onions in the international market due to low production in the major onion-producing countries which has led to an abnormal increase in the price of onions in the domestic market. As a result, in the current 2020-21 fiscal year TCB has been active in onion sales activities for more than eight consecutive months as per the instant instruction of the government. This has enabled the marginalized people of the country to buy onions at normal prices and kept the price of onions at an affordable level. During the month of Ramadan, essential commodities including chickpeas and dates were sold to the consumers at an affordable price. But during last Ramadan, following the directives of the Hon'ble Prime Minister's Office, 8-10% of the demand was met, which was 10-12 times higher than the previous Ramadan’s supply. As a result, consumers have been able to purchase essential commodities supplied by TCB (pulses, oil, sugar, chickpea, dates, and onions) at an affordable price in all districts of the country, including most of the Upazilas during the last Ramadan.

TCB sells onions on the open market in an effort to stabilize prices. Consumers can also order onions from TCB through online stores.

During the period of the Covid-19 outbreak, the Government identified TCB as an essential services agency in order to keep the livelihood activities of the people active and provided necessary guidelines for conducting emergency activities during the event of the Covid-19 outbreak. In light of these guidelines, TCB has been conducting product sales through Truck-sell and Store-sell across the country since the Corona outbreak. This has enabled marginalized people to purchase essential commodities at low cost which has facilitated the improvement of the living standards of the people including poverty alleviation. Besides, it has been made possible to supply products to the people by maintaining social distance following the hygiene rules. TCB's sales activities played a major role in keeping the country's food supply chain normal during the lockdown period. During FY 2019-20 products were sold through 36,107 trucks and general allocations which have benefited about 59.4 million people (assuming 400 buyers per truck and 4 members in each buyer's family).

Previously, TCB used to sell products only during the month of Ramadan or in special situations to keep the market price stable. But now it is working to meet the demand of the general public by selling pulses, sugar, and edible oil in the open market around the year. Recently, due to the abnormal rise in the price of potatoes in the domestic market, the government instantly issued instructions to conduct potato sales activities. Following the directive, TCB conducted potato selling activities at the rate of Tk 25 per kg through its dealer since October 21, 2020.

With the aim to play an effective role in safeguarding the interests of the general public by preventing supply shortages and price hikes, keeping the prices of essential commodities stable, the Trading Corporation of Bangladesh (TCB) was founded by Presidential Order No-68/1972 in the aftermath of the food and commodities shortages of the Bangladesh Liberation War.
