= Dee Mangin =

New Zealand primary care academic

Derelie (Dee) Mangin
- Education: University of Otago
- Scientific career
- Fields: Primary care
- Workplaces: University of Otago, McMaster University

Derelie (Dee) Mangin is a New Zealand primary care academic. She is a full professor at the University of Otago

== Career ==
She earned her MB, BCh and DPH at the University of Otago. She is a Fellow of the Royal New Zealand College of General Practitioners.

Mangin was a member of New Zealand Pharmaceutical and Therapeutic Products Advisory Committee (known as PHARMAC).

== Selected works ==
- Garfinkel, Doron, and Derelie Mangin. "Feasibility study of a systematic approach for discontinuation of multiple medications in older adults: addressing polypharmacy." Archives of Internal Medicine 170, no. 18 (2010): 1648–1654.
- Corwin, Paul, Les Toop, Graham McGeoch, Martin Than, Simon Wynn-Thomas, J. Elisabeth Wells, Robin Dawson et al. "Randomised controlled trial of intravenous antibiotic treatment for cellulitis at home compared with hospital." Bmj 330, no. 7483 (2005): 129.
- Mangin, Dee, Kieran Sweeney, and Iona Heath. "Preventive health care in elderly people needs rethinking." Bmj 335, no. 7614 (2007): 285–287.
- Mangin, Dee, Iona Heath, and Marc Jamoulle. "Beyond diagnosis: rising to the multimorbidity challenge." (2012): e3526.
- Mangin, Dee, and Les Toop. "The Quality and Outcomes Framework: what have you done to yourselves?." (2007): 435–437.
