= Export, West Virginia =

Unincorporated community in West Virginia, United States

- Unincorporated community
- Location within West Virginia Location within the United States
- Coordinates: 37°51′28″N 81°00′2″W
- Country: United States
- State: West Virginia
- County: Fayette
- Elevation: 1,739 ft (530 m)
- Time zone: UTC-5 (Eastern (EST))
  - Summer (DST): UTC-4 (EDT)
- GNIS ID: 1556087

Export was an unincorporated community and coal town in Fayette County, West Virginia, United States. It was also known as Robins.

Export was so named on account of the community's chief export, coal.
