= Institute of Chartered Secretaries of Bangladesh =

Public institute

- Abbreviation: ICSB
- Formation: 2010
- Type: Professional Institute
- Professional title: ACS, FCS
- Headquarters: 115 Kazi Nazrul Islam Avenue, Bangla Motor
- Location: Dhaka-1000
- Region served: Bangladesh
- Affiliations: CSIA
- Website: icsb.edu.bd

Institute of Chartered Secretaries of Bangladesh (ICSB), established in 2010 under the Chartered Secretaries Act 2010, is only public institute to develop, promote and regulate the profession of Chartered Secretary in Bangladesh. ICSB is a statutory body administrated by Ministry of Commerce, Government of the People's Republic of Bangladesh and it is regulated under CS Regulations 2011.

== History ==
The Institute of Chartered Secretaries and Managers of Bangladesh (ICSMB), a national professional institute, was established in July 1997 under license from the Companies Act 1994. Subsequently, on 7 June 2010, parliament unanimously passed the Chartered Secretaries Bill 2010. On 16 June 2010, the Institute of Chartered Secretaries of Bangladesh (ICSB) has since been converted into a statutory body under the Chartered Secretaries Act, 2010. The Institute of Chartered Secretaries of Bangladesh is administered by a Council consisting of 13 elected members and 5 nominees of the government of Bangladesh. First "ICSB National Award for Corporate Governance Excellence" was held on December 04, 2014 at BICC, Dhaka, Bangladesh.

== Chartered Secretary (CS) Qualification ==
Chartered Secretary (CS) qualification is the highest professional program offered by the Institute of Chartered Secretaries of Bangladesh (ICSB). The CS Program has been designed with 5 (five) levels (excluding Foundation Level), a total of 1800 Marks. A student is able to complete all levels of CS Program in 2 (two) years. Each course/paper has 100 marks. It offers courses twice in a year, for January–June session in December and for July–December session in June. The student handbook contains details of its academic courses. The secretarial standard is also maintained.

== Comparing ICSB with other professional bodies ==
The prime task of ICSB is to create professional in order for ensuring sound corporate governance in corporates in Bangladesh. In Bangladesh, Institute of Chartered Accountants of Bangladesh, and Institute of Cost and Management Accountants of Bangladesh creates Chartered Accountants and Cost & Management Accountants respectively for corporates of the country.

Therefore, ICSB is not exactly the same. ICSB is the only recognized "Governance Professional" body, whereas ICAB and ICMAB are the recognized as "Accounting Professional" bodies. ICSB aims to develop, promote and regulate the profession of Chartered/Company Secretaries in Bangladesh. In broader aspect to enhance Corporate Governance, ICSB provides qualification in Chartered Secretaryship. The similarity is that, all those 03 (three) professional institutes are under the umbrella of under Ministry of Commerce, Government of the People's Republic of Bangladesh.

== International affiliation ==
The institute has the affiliation with the following institution:

- The Corporate Secretaries International Association (CSIA)
