= Bangladesh Institute of Science and Technology =

Educational institute in Dhaka Bangladesh

Coordinates: 23.7406°N 90.4109°E

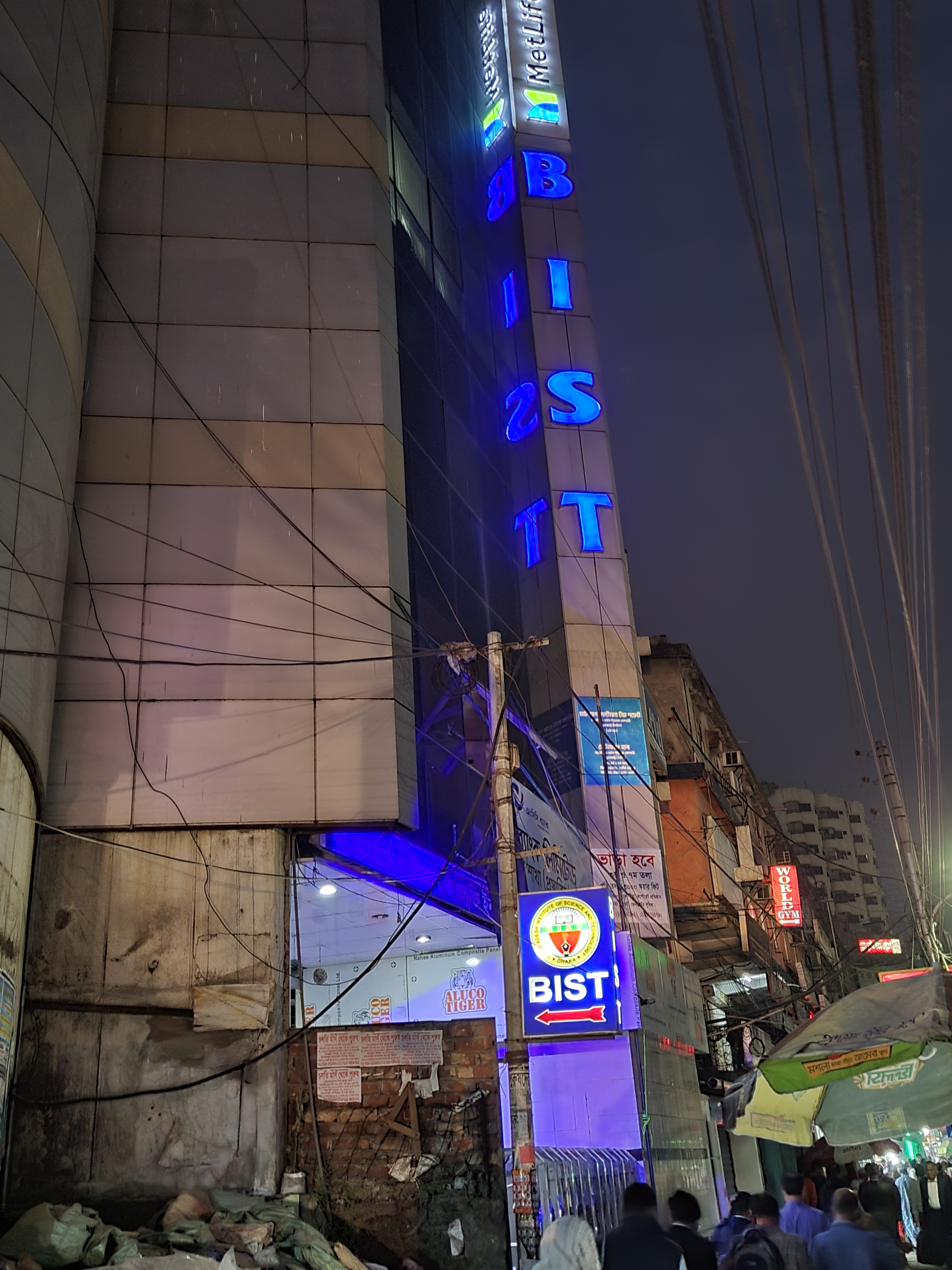
- Type: Bachelor, Masters
- Established: 1998
- Principal: Er. S. K. Banik
- Academic staff: 10
- Students: 1200
- Undergraduates: 1000
- Postgraduates: 200
- Location: Kakrail, Dhaka, Bangladesh
- Campus: 0.5 acre
- Affiliations: National University

Bangladesh Institute of Science and Technology (Bengali: বাংলাদেশ বিজ্ঞান ও প্রযুক্তি ইনস্টিটিউট; BIST) is a university-level institution affiliated with the National University, Bangladesh located in Dhaka, Bangladesh.The institute was established in 1999 at Kakrail in Dhaka. The institute is regulated by a governing body consisting of Principal, Head of the Faculty Science and Engineering, Head of the Faculty of Business Studies all within the rules and regulations of National University of Bangladesh.

== History ==
Bangladesh Institute of Science and Technology (BIST) was established in 1999..

== Campus ==
BIST is located at 122, New Kakrail Road, Dhaka 1000, Bangladesh.

== Programs and courses under National University ==
- M.Sc. in Computer Science & Engineering (MCSE)
- Masters of Business Administration (MBA)
- B.Sc. (HONS) in Computer Science and Engineering (CSE)
- B.Sc. (HONS) in Electronics and Communication Engineering (ECE)
- Bachelor of Business Administration (BBA)

== Other courses under Bangladesh Technical Education Board ==
- Diploma in Computer Technology
- Diploma in Electrical Technology
- Diploma in Electronics Technology
- H.S.C. Business Management (BM)
