= Bangladesh Insurance Academy =

Public training institute

- Abbreviation: BIA
- Formation: 1973
- Type: Professional Insurance Institute
- Professional title: ABIA
- Headquarters: 53, Mohakhali Commercial Area
- Location: Dhaka-1212
- Region served: Bangladesh
- Affiliations: CII, MII
- Website: bia.gov.bd

The Bangladesh Insurance Academy (BIA), established in 1973, is the only public training institute imparting insurance training and education for the insurance professionals of the country. The management of the academy is vested in a board formed by the government. The academy also provides tailor-made insurance training for the insurance operators in Bangladesh. Additionally it organizes customized training sessions, seminars, symposiums and conferences on issues relating to the insurance sector of Bangladesh.

== History ==
In the year 1973 the academy came into being through a government resolution. It currently functions as an autonomous body under the administrative control of the Ministry of Finance. The members of the Board are drawn from concerned ministries, regulatory authorities, state insurance corporations, private insurance companies, Bangladesh insurance association, and University of Dhaka.

== Main area of activities ==
Every year the Bangladesh Insurance Academy conducts different courses on insurance affairs leading to Diploma. It offers professional diploma in life and non-life Insurance. The academy is also working as overseas examination centers of some foreign insurance institutes including Actuarial Society of India (ASI), and Chartered Insurance Institute (CII), London. The prime roles centers round creating professional insurers in Bangladesh. Quite recently the academy has started offering BIA Diploma online counseling classes, which are usually held in the evening so that the existing employees of the insurance sector can take part using computer and/or mobile devices. The academy also offers a tailored-made training program for the insurance companies of the country. Throughout the year, Bangladesh Insurance Academy conducts training program across the country, particularly in the divisional cities of Bangladesh.

== International affiliation ==
The Bangladesh Insurance Academy has the affiliation with the following institutions:

- the Chartered Insurance Institute (CII)
- the Malaysian Insurance Institute (MII)
- the Institute of Actuaries of India (IAI)
