= Ed Dee =

American novelist

- Born: Edward J. Dee Jr. February 3, 1940 (age 86); Yonkers, New York, U.S.
- Education: Fordham University (BA); Arizona State University (MFA)
- Writing career
- Years active: 1990s–2000s
- Genre: Crime fiction
- Notable work: 14 Peck Slip (1994)

Edward J. Dee Jr. (born February 3, 1940), publishing as Ed Dee, is an American author of crime fiction.

Dee was born in Yonkers, New York on February 3, 1940. He graduated from Sacred Heart High School, then served two years in the United States Army. In 1962 in joined the New York City Police Department (NYPD). He earned a BA from Fordham University.

Dee retired from the NYPD as a lieutenant in 1982 and then he began to write. He earned an MFA in creative writing from Arizona State University in 1992. His first novel, 14 Peck Slip, was named a notable book of the year in 1994 by The New York Times. Bronx Angel (1995), Little Boy Blue (1997), Nightbird (1999), and The Con Man's Daughter (2003) followed.

Panek identifies nostalgia for police traditions as a major theme of Dee's oeuvre.

== Works ==
- Dee, Ed (1994). 14 Peck Slip. New York: Warner Books. ISBN 0-446-51770-4. OCLC 28631889.
- Dee, Ed (1995). Bronx Angel. New York: Warner Books. ISBN 0-446-51774-7. OCLC 32014140.
- Dee, Ed (1997). Little Boy Blue. New York: Warner Books. ISBN 0-446-60522-0. OCLC 38233001.
- Dee, Ed (1999). Nightbird. New York: Warner Books. ISBN 0-446-52039-X. OCLC 40954016.
- Dee, Ed (2000). "The Tailman". Cop Tales 2000. Indianapolis: 38 Special Press. ISBN 0-9675749-0-0. OCLC 44156262.
- Dee, Ed (2003). The Con Man's Daughter. New York: Mysterious Press. ISBN 0-89296-794-3. OCLC 52055941.
