= Registrar of Joint Stock Companies And Firms =

- Founded: 1962
- Headquarters: Dhaka, Bangladesh
- Owner: Government of Bangladesh
- Website: www.roc.gov.bd

The Registrar of Joint Stock Companies And Firms (RJSC) is an organization of Government of People's Republic of Bangladesh.

== History ==
After the independence of Pakistan, the RJSC was established for the first time in 1962 in the port city of Chittagong under the Ministry of Commerce. Then it started its activities with some documents from companies, professional organizations and partnership business from Calcutta, India. Its office was transferred to Dhaka. Currently, under RJSC, there are 1 lakh 90 thousand institutions (till June 2015) registered.
