= Bangladesh Foreign Trade Institute =

Research institute in Bangladesh

- Seal of Bangladesh Foreign Trade Institute
- Formation: 2003; 23 years ago
- Headquarters: Dhaka, Bangladesh
- Region served: Bangladesh
- Official language: Bengali
- Website: www.bfti.org.bd

Bangladesh Foreign Trade Institute is an autonomous research institute that researches ways of improving bilateral trade and providing education to stakeholders and is located in Dhaka, Bangladesh. Former senior secretary Dr Md Jafar Uddin is the chief executive officer of the institute.

== History ==
Bangladesh Foreign Trade Institute was established in 2003 under the Ministry of Commerce. Its inception traces back to the Ministry's public-private partnership. It is managed by a board of directors chaired by the Minister of Commerce. The board also includes private stakeholders like the Federation of Bangladesh Chambers of Commerce and Industry.

Bangladesh Foreign Trade Institute signed an agreement with CNN, represented by Spellbound Communications Limited in Bangladesh, to promote "Made in Bangladesh" in June 2021.
