= Office of Chief Controller of Imports and Exports =

- আমদানি ও রপ্তানি প্রধান নিয়ন্ত্রকের দপ্তর
- Formation: 1950
- Headquarters: Dhaka, Bangladesh
- Region served: Bangladesh
- Official language: Bengali
- Website: Office of Chief Controller of Imports and Exports

Office of Chief Controller of Imports and Exports (আমদানি ও রপ্তানি প্রধান নিয়ন্ত্রকের দপ্তর) is a government regulatory department of Bangladesh concerning export and import and is located in Dhaka, Bangladesh. The department issues export and import certifications and advises the government on trade and tariff.

== History ==
Office of Chief Controller of Imports and Exports was founded on 19 April 1950 through the passage of the Import Export Control Act, 1950 in East Pakistan. It is under the Ministry of Commerce.

== Corruption ==
In October 2015, Md Shahidul Haque, a high official of the Office of Chief Controller of Imports and Exports was suspended after videos of him taking bribes went viral on Social media in Bangladesh.
