= WIDA Consortium =

Consortium on US state education

- Established: 2002
- Location: Madison, Wisconsin, U.S.
- Website: wida.wisc.edu

The WIDA Consortium (formerly World-Class Instructional Design and Assessment) is an educational consortium of state departments of education. Currently, 42 U.S. states and the District of Columbia participate in the WIDA Consortium, as well as the Northern Mariana Islands, the United States Virgin Islands, Palau, the Bureau of Indian Education, and the Department of Defense Education Activity. WIDA designs and implements proficiency standards and assessment for grade K-12 students who are English-language learners, as well as a set of proficiency standards and assessments for Spanish language learners. WIDA also provides professional development to educators and conducts research on instructional practices.

WIDA was established in 2003 with a grant from the U.S. Department of Education to the Wisconsin Department of Public Instruction for the purpose of creating English language proficiency standards and assessments. The purpose of such Enhanced Assessment Grants is to support State activities designed to improve the quality, validity, and reliability of state academic assessments beyond the requirements for such assessments described in section 111(b)(3) of the Elementary and Secondary Education Act, as amended by the No Child Left Behind Act of 2001. The consortium originally began with Wisconsin, Delaware, and Arkansas, which were the sources of the acronym WIDA, although Arkansas dropped out. The acronym definitions ("Wisconsin-Delaware-Arkansas" and the acronym developed to match the new constituent states, "World Class Instructional Design and Assessment") are no longer used.

Member State	Department of Education
Alabama	Alabama State Department of Education
Alaska	Alaska Department of Education
Colorado	Colorado Department of Education
Delaware	Delaware Department of Education
District of Columbia	District of Columbia Public Schools
Florida	Florida Department of Education
Georgia	Georgia Department of Education
Hawaii	Hawaii Department of Education
Idaho	Idaho State Department of Education
Illinois	Illinois State Board of Education
Indiana	Indiana Department of Education
Kansas* WIDA Alternate ACCESS User	Kansas State Department of Education
Maine	Maine Department of Education
Maryland	Maryland State Department of Education
Massachusetts	Massachusetts Department of Elementary and Secondary Education
Michigan	Michigan Department of Education
Minnesota	Minnesota Department of Education
Missouri	Missouri Department of Elementary and Secondary Education
Montana	Montana Office of Public Instruction
Nevada	Nevada Department of Education
New Hampshire	New Hampshire Department of Education
New Jersey	New Jersey Department of Education
New Mexico	New Mexico Public Education Department
North Carolina	North Carolina Department of Public Instruction
North Dakota	North Dakota Department of Public Instruction
Oklahoma	Oklahoma State Department of Education
Pennsylvania	Pennsylvania Department of Education
Rhode Island	Rhode Island Department of Education
South Carolina	South Carolina Department of Education
South Dakota	South Dakota Department of Education
Tennessee	Tennessee Department of Education
Utah	Utah State Board of Education
Vermont	Vermont Agency of Education
Virginia	Virginia Department of Education
Washington	Washington Office of Superintendent of Public Instruction
Wisconsin	Wisconsin Department of Public Instruction
Wyoming	Wyoming Department of Education
Northern Mariana Islands	CNMI Public School System
United States Virgin Islands	Virgin Islands Department of Education
Palau	Palau Ministry of Education
Bureau of Indian Education	Bureau of Indian Education
Department of Defense Education Activity	Department of Defense Education Activity

In addition to its consortium member state partners, the WIDA project partners with the Center for Applied Linguistics (CAL) in Washington, D.C., and MetriTech, Inc. of Champaign, IL, and most recently, Data Recognition Corporation (DRC), Maple Grove, MN.

The WIDA Consortium administrative office is located in the Wisconsin Center for Education Research at the University of Wisconsin-Madison

The language standards used by WIDA consortium member state department of education are referred to as the English Language Development (ELD) Standards Framework.

== WIDA Assessments ==
WIDA provides several assessments for use with English-language learners. The WIDA Screener assessments are used as a screening test to determine the language level of students entering a school system. These results are used most frequently to determine if a student is eligible for services as an English language learner. The ACCESS for ELLs test is an annual assessment given to students identified as English language learners and the results are used to determine the student's growth and progress, as well as to inform instruction for the next year. This test has been administered annually in WIDA member states beginning in the 2005–06 academic year. The WIDA MODEL assessment is used in the U.S. and several other countries as an interim measure of English language proficiency.

Accommodations for students with disabilities are allowed within the ACCESS for ELLs and WIDA Screener tests. These accommodations are not intended to change what the test measures but allow students with disabilities to participate in an appropriate manner. These accommodations are given on an individual basis, and should not change what skills the test is measuring. State departments of education may not allow all accommodations named by WIDA.

=== WIDA Screener ===
The WIDA Screener is an assessment given to incoming students to determine if they are English Language Learners (ELLs). School districts determine upon enrollment if incoming students need to take this test. The purpose of the test is for educators to determine if students would benefit from ELL programs that schools have to offer. The WIDA Screener for Kindergarten is a one-on-one test given with paper and pencil materials. The WIDA Screener Online is given to incoming students in grades 1-12. Writing for Grades 1-3 is completed on paper but scored online. The WIDA Screener is also available in a paper version.

=== ACCESS for ELLs Online ===
The ACCESS for ELLs Online test is given annually to students in grades 1-12 who have already been identified as ELLs. The test is computer-based, except for the Writing test for grades 1-3, which is completed in a paper booklet. The test is adaptive and gives the students easier or more challenging questions based on their previous answers. The assessment consists of four tests, one for each language domain: Listening, Reading, Speaking, and Writing. Student proficiency level scores range from 1.0 (Entering) to 6.0 (Reaching). Scores can be used to monitor student progress, make instructional choices, and determine whether students should be exited from English language services. Criteria for using scores are determined by individual state departments of education. ACCESS for ELLs is also available in a paper version.

=== Kindergarten ACCESS for ELLs ===
The Kindergarten ACCESS for ELLs assessment is given to kindergarteners identified as ELLs. Students are testing in Listening, Speaking, Reading, and Writing in a one-on-one test environment using paper and pencil materials. As with the test for grades 1-12, student scores can be used to monitor student progress, make instructional choices, and determine whether students should be exited from English language services, based on criteria determined by the state where testing occurs.

=== WIDA Alternate ACCESS ===
WIDA Alternate ACCESS is an annual test for K-12 students identified as ELLs who also have a significant cognitive disability. The test is administered individually using paper and pencil materials. Students are testing in Listening, Speaking, Reading, and Writing. The determination whether a student takes this assessment or ACCESS for ELLs is made by the student's IEP committee, based on criteria set by their state.

=== WIDA MODEL ===
WIDA MODEL is an interim assessment that can be given to monitor student progress throughout the year. Similar to ACCESS for ELLs, it tests students in Listening, Speaking, Reading, and Writing. Grades 1-12 can take the test online or on paper. WIDA MODEL for Kindergarten is only paper-based and is administered individually.
