= HMS Dee =

A number of ships of the Royal Navy have borne the name HMS Dee, after one or other of the British rivers called the Dee.

- HMS Dee (1814), a Conway-class sixth-rate frigate (or corvette) built by Jabez Bayley in Ipswich, launched in May 1814, commissioned at Sheerness in October 1814, and sold in July 1819.
- HMS Dee was to have been a Cherokee-class flush-decked brig (or brig-sloop) ordered from Woolwich dockyard in March 1823, and re-ordered as a paddle-steamer in May 1824.
- HMS Dee (1832), a paddle steamer built by Woolwich dockyard, launched in May 1832, that served until June 1871, and broken up at Sheerness in October 1871.
- HMS Dee (1877), a Medina-class flatiron gunboat built by Palmer, launched in April 1877, and sold in 1902.
- HMS Dee (1903), a River-class destroyer built by Palmer, launched in September 1903, completed in May 1903, and sold in 1919.
- HMS Beckford, a Ford-class patrol boat launched in 1955 was renamed HMS Dee whilst serving as the training tender to the Mersey Division of the Royal Naval Reserve.
