= Army Institute of Business Administration =

Army Institute of Business Administration may refer to:

- Army Institute of Business Administration, Savar, Bangladesh
- Army Institute of Business Administration, Sylhet, Bangladesh
