= Keť =

Keť Érsekkéty
- Municipality
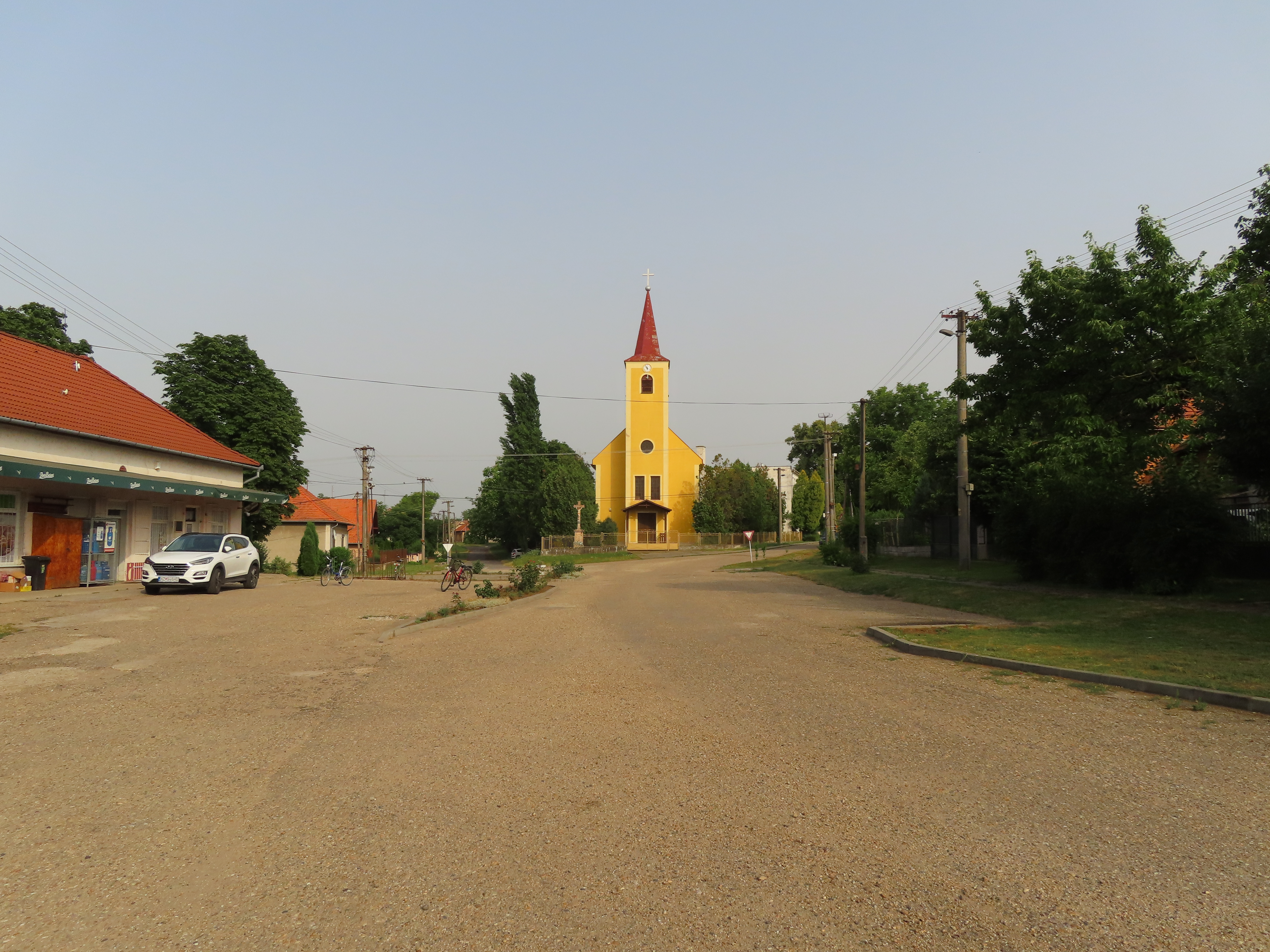

- Flag Coat of arms

- Location of Keť in the Nitra Region Location of Keť in Slovakia
- Coordinates: 47.97°N 18.57°E
- Country: Slovakia
- Region: Nitra Region
- District: Levice District
- First mentioned: 1308

Area
  - Total: 19.64 km^{2} (7.58 sq mi)
- Elevation: 155 m (509 ft)

Population (2025)
  - Total: 564
- Time zone: UTC+1 (CET)
  - Summer (DST): UTC+2 (CEST)
- Postal code: 935 64
- Area code: +421 36
- Vehicle registration plate (until 2022): LV
- Website: www.ket.sk

Keť (Hungarian: Érsekkéty) is a village and municipality in the Levice District in the Nitra Region of Slovakia.

== History ==
In historical records the village was first mentioned in 1308.

== Geography ==
The municipality lies at an altitude of 155 metres (509 ft) and covers an area of 19.64 km^{2} (7.58 sq mi) (2025).

== Population ==
Population statistic (10 years)
| Year | 1995 | 2005 | 2015 | 2025 |
|---|---|---|---|---|
| Count | 753 | 680 | 619 | 564 |
| Difference | | −9.69% | −8.97% | −8.88% |

Population statistic
| Year | 2024 | 2025 |
|---|---|---|
| Count | 562 | 564 |
| Difference | | +0.35% |

It has a population of 564 people (31 December 2025).

=== Ethnicity ===
Census 2021 (1+ %)
| Ethnicity | Number | Fraction |
|---|---|---|
| Hungarian | 487 | 84.4% |
| Slovak | 81 | 14.03% |
| Not found out | 37 | 6.41% |
| Total | 577 | |

In year 2021 was 577 people by ethnicity 487 as Hungarian, 81 as Slovak, 37 as Not found out, 3 as Czech, 1 as Romanian and 1 as Other.

Note on population: The difference values of population numbers in the table "Population statistic" and in the sections "Ethnicity" & "Religion" is caused by the use of various statistical methods.

=== Religion ===
Census 2021 (1+ %)
| Religion | Number | Fraction |
|---|---|---|
| Roman Catholic Church | 247 | 42.81% |
| Calvinist Church | 245 | 42.46% |
| None | 50 | 8.67% |
| Not found out | 22 | 3.81% |
| Evangelical Church | 6 | 1.04% |
| Total | 577 | |

In year 2021 was 577 people by religion 247 from Roman Catholic Church, 245 from Calvinist Church, 50 from None, 22 from Not found out, 6 from Evangelical Church, 2 from Other, 1 from Old Catholic Church, 1 from Eastern Orthodox Church, 1 from Islam, 1 from Greek Catholic Church and 1 from Buddhism.

== Government ==
The village has its own birth registry.

== Facilities ==
The village has a public library, a gym, and a soccer pitch.
