= Dee Brown (politician) =

American politician (born 1948)

Dee L. Brown

Member of the Montana Senate from the 2nd district
- In office January 7, 2013 – January 4, 2021
- Preceded by: Ryan Zinke
- Succeeded by: Carl Glimm

Member of the Montana House of Representatives from the 3rd district
- In office January 5, 2009 – January 3, 2011
- Preceded by: Douglas Cordier
- Succeeded by: Jerry O'Neil
- In office January 3, 2005 – January 3, 2007
- Preceded by: Ronald Devlin
- Succeeded by: Douglas Cordier

Member of the Montana House of Representatives from the 83rd district
- In office January 3, 2001 – January 3, 2005
- Succeeded by: Harry Klock

Personal details
- Born: October 22, 1948 (age 77) Rugby, North Dakota, U.S.
- Party: Republican
- Education: University of Montana
- Occupation: Businesswoman, politician

Dee Lyngstad Brown (born October 22, 1948) is an American politician from Montana. Brown, a Republican, represented District 3 (District 83, prior to 2005) in Flathead County in the Montana House of Representatives. Brown served as a member of the House Federal Relations, Energy, and Telecommunications committee, and as vice chair of the Legislative Administration and State Administration committees.

In 2006, Brown ran unsuccessfully for District 3 as an independent, losing to Democrat Douglas Cordier.

== See also ==
- Montana House of Representatives, District 3
