= Bangladesh Tea Research Institute =

Tea Research Institute in Sylhet, Bangladesh

Coordinates: 24°17′37.94″N 91°44′52.64″E

Bangladesh Tea Research Institute বাংলাদেশ চা গবেষণা ইনস্টিটিউট
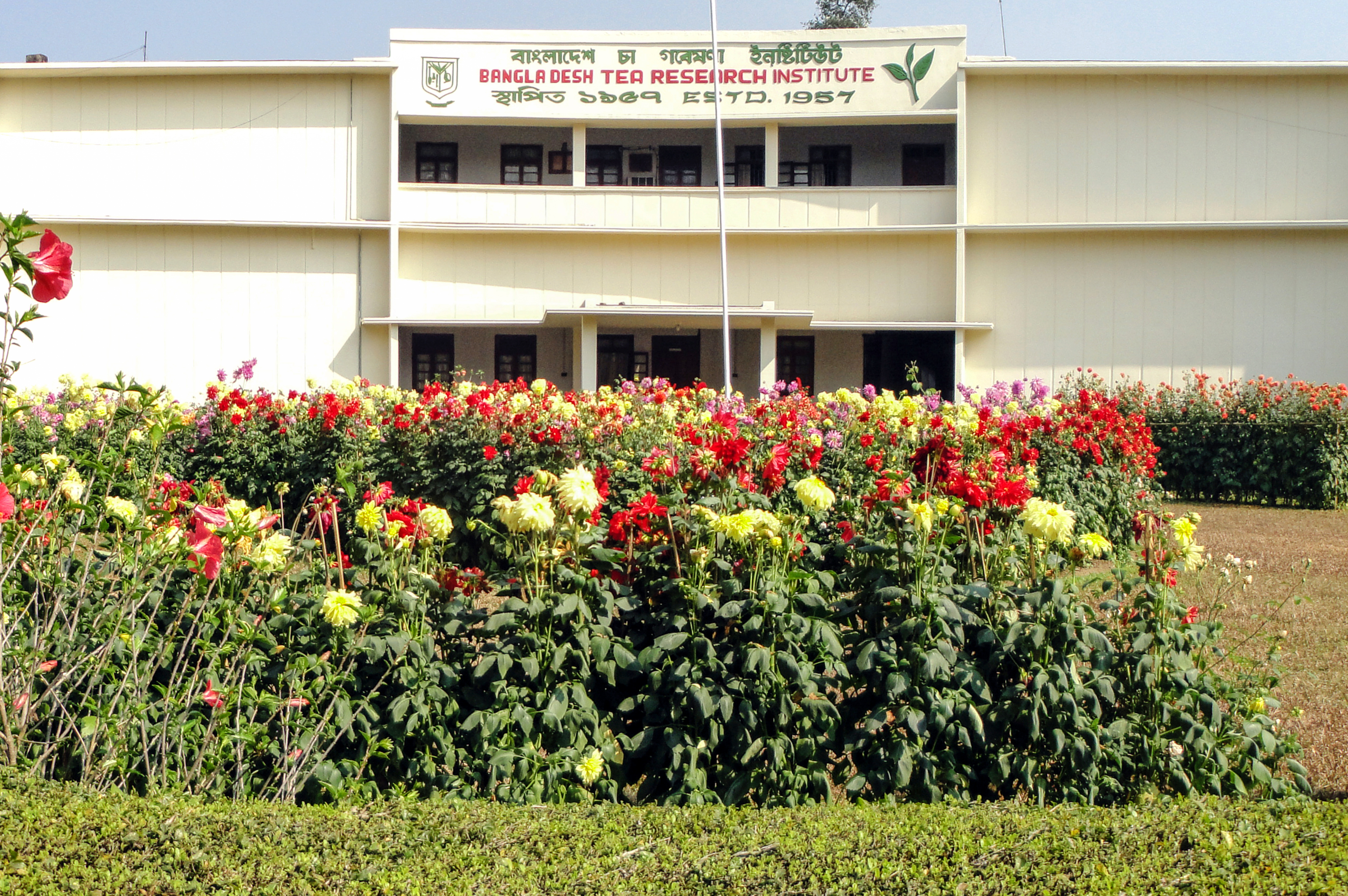
- Bangladesh Tea Research Institute, Sreemangal
- Formation: 1973
- Headquarters: Sreemangal, Moulvibazar District, Sylhet, Bangladesh
- Region served: Bangladesh
- Official language: Bengali
- Website: Bangladesh Tea Research Institute

Bangladesh Tea Research Institute (Bengali: বাংলাদেশ চা গবেষণা ইনস্টিটিউট) (BTRI) is an autonomous organisation under the Bangladesh Tea Board (BTB).

== Background ==
The Pakistan Tea Board, in 1957 established a tea research station in East Pakistan. After the Independence of Bangladesh the station was upgraded to a research institute by the government of Bangladesh in 1973.
