= EMD DH1 =

Type and origin
- Power type: Diesel-hydraulic
- Build date: May 1951
- Total produced: 33
Specifications
- Prime mover: 2 × Detroit Diesel
- Transmission: 2 × Allison torque converter
Performance figures
- Power output: 340 hp (250 kW)

The EMD DH1 was a class of experimental diesel-hydraulic switcher locomotives built by General Motors Electro-Motive Division in May 1951. It was powered by a pair of small diesel engines suspended under the frame, driving through a pair of Allison torque converter transmissions to the inside wheels on each truck. These inside wheels were substantially smaller than the outside wheels on each truck.

Over 60 examples of a three axle DHI and its derivatives were built by Clyde Engineering in Australia and used on private railways, in particular in the sugar industry in Queensland. The Clyde Engineering model was the DHI-71 and the two DHI-110s on Lakewood Firewood Company. These DHI models were built between 6/54 and 6/71.

== See also ==
- Lakewood Firewood Co/Commonwealth Railways DH1
