= Dee Harvey =

- Born: Demetrius La Vell Harvey; August 24, 1965; Memphis, Tennessee, United States
- Died: December 1, 2012 (aged 47) Los Angeles County, California, United States
- Genres: R&B
- Occupation: Singer

Demetrius La Vell "Dee" Harvey (August 24, 1965 – December 1, 2012) was an American R&B singer. He was at one time signed to Motown and recorded his first album, Just as I Am with Motown in 1991.

Harvey was born in Memphis, Tennessee, and attended Trezevant High School. Harvey was best known for his 1991 hit "Leave Well Enough Alone", which reached No. 61 on the US R&B chart, and his 1992 hit "Just as I Am" (#68 R&B).

Harvey also sang with Harry Belafonte in 1989. During his career, he also sang with Aaron Neville and Dionne Warwick among others. In 2010, he mainly performed as a backup singer to Rod Stewart. He also performed and sang two songs, "In the Middle" and "Are You Ready for Me", on the soundtrack of the 1991 film The Five Heartbeats, directed by Robert Townsend.

Dee Harvey died at age 47 in California.
