= John Dee (disambiguation) =

John Dee (1527–c. 1608) was an English mathematician, astronomer, astrologer, occultist, navigator, imperialist, and consultant to Queen Elizabeth I.

John Dee may also refer to:

- John Dee (basketball) (1923–1999), Basketball coach
- John Dee, the alter-ego of Doctor Destiny, the DC Comics supervillain and Sandman character
- Johnny Dee (Marvel Comics), a Marvel Comics character, one of the mutants
- Johnny Dee (musician) (born 1964), American heavy metal drummer
- Johnny Dee, alias for 1950s and 1960s American singer and songwriter John D. Loudermilk (1934–2016)
- Johnnie Dee, frontman for the 1980s Canadian hard rock/AOR band, Honeymoon Suite
- John Dee (rugby union) (born 1938), English international rugby player

== See also ==
- Jon Dee Graham (born 1959), musician and songwriter from Texas, U.S.A.
- Jack Dee (born 1961), English comedian
