= Institute of Cost and Management Accountants of Bangladesh =

Accounting institute in Bangladesh

The Institute of Cost and Management Accountants of Bangladesh
- Type: The national body of the professional Cost and Management Accountants of Bangladesh
- Established: 1977
- Affiliations: International Federation of Accountants and International Accounting Standards Board
- President: Md. Mahtab Uddin Ahmed FCMA
- Vice-president: Kausar Alam FCMA and Md. Abdul Matin Patwary FCMA
- Students: 30,000
- Location: Dhaka, Bangladesh
- Campus: Bogra District, Chattogram, Comilla, Dhaka (main), Jessore, Khulna, Rajshahi
- Website: icmab.gov.bd

The Institute of Cost and Management Accountants of Bangladesh (ICMAB) is an institution dedicated to cost and management accounting education and research in Bangladesh. It is managed as an autonomous professional body under the Ministry of Commerce. As well as education, it is also engaged in regulating and promoting the profession of cost and management accountant in Bangladesh.

== History ==
In 1972, the institute was re-established in the name of Bangladesh Institute of Industrial Accountants. The government of Bangladesh renamed it as The Institute of Cost and Management Accountants of Bangladesh through promulgation of The Cost and Management Accountants Ordinance 1977 (Ordinance No LIII of 1977).

ICMAB members are known as CMAs with their designatory title ACMA and FCMA. They play leading roles in the accountancy and finance profession in Bangladesh. 30% of members live and work outside of Bangladesh.

== International association ==
ICMAB is a member of the following international accounting bodies:

- International Federation of Accountants (IFAC)
- Confederation of Asia Pacific Accountants (CAPA)
- South Asian Federation of Accountants (SAFA)
- International Accounting Standard Board (IASB)

== National and international recognition ==
The ICMAB qualification is recognised by many professional bodies nationally and internationally. The bodies that have granted exemption to ICMAB members or qualified students are:

- Chartered Institute of Management Accountants (CIMA), UK
- Association of Chartered Certified Accountants (ACCA), UK
- Institute of Management Accountants (IMA), US
- Society of Management Accountants of Canada (CMA Canada)
- Certified General Accountants Association of Canada (CGA-Canada)
- Institute of Certified Financial Consultants (IFC), the United States and Canada
- Institute of Certified Public Accountants (ACPA), US
- Institute of Public Accountants (IPA), Australia
- Institute of Chartered Accountants of Bangladesh (ICAB)
