= Import and export of data =

The import and export of data is the automated or semi-automated input and output of data sets between different software applications. It involves "translating" from the format used in one application into that used by another, where such translation is accomplished automatically via machine processes, such as transcoding, data transformation, and others. True exports of data often contain data in raw formats otherwise unreadable to end-users without the user interface that was designed to render it.

Import and export of data shares semantic analogy with copying and pasting, in that sets of data are copied from one application and pasted into another. In fact, the software development behind operating system clipboards (and clipboard extender apps) greatly concerns the many details and challenges of data transformation and transcoding, in order to present the end user with the illusion of effortless copy and paste between any two apps, no matter how internally different. The "Save As" command in many applications requires much of the same engineering, when files are saved as another file format.

The ability to import and export data (or lack of such ability) has large economic implications, because it can be resource-intensive to input data in non-automated ways (such as manual rekeying), and because lack of interoperability and data portability between systems unable to import or export data between each other causes stovepiping, lack of opportunity and efficiencies such as those seen in, for example, mash-ups, and may not suffice in its ability to search for information as enabled by tools such as grep.

Extract, transform, load (ETL) - the typical import procedure into databases

== See also ==
- Data dump as export from databases
- Data portability
- Solid (web decentralization project): allows users to control and export their own data
