= Heves County 3rd constituency =

Legislative constituency in Hungary

Heves County 3rd constituency (Hatvan)
- Constituency for the National Assembly
- Location of Heves county 03 within Heves county

- Location of Heves county within Hungary
- County: Heves
- Electorate: 80,288 (2018)
- Major settlements: Hatvan

Current constituency
- Created: 2011
- Party: Tisza Party
- Member: Áron Juhász
- Created from: Constituency no. 4; Constituency no. 5; Constituency no. 3
- Elected: 2026

The 3rd constituency of Heves County (Hungarian: Heves megyei 03. számú országgyűlési egyéni választókerület) is one of the single member constituencies of the National Assembly, the national legislature of Hungary. The constituency standard abbreviation: Heves 03. OEVK.

Since 2026, it has been represented by Áron Juhász of the Tisza Party.

== Geography ==
The 3rd constituency is located in southern part of Heves County.

The constituency borders with 2nd constituency to the north, 1st constituency to the east, 3rd constituency of Jász-Nagykun-Szolnok to the southeast, 2nd constituency of Jász-Nagykun-Szolnok to the south, 9th-, 6th constituency of Pest County and 2nd constituency of Nógrád County to the west and 1st constituency of Nógrád County to the northwest.

=== List of municipalities ===
The constituency includes the following municipalities:

1. Adács
2. Apc
3. Atkár
4. Boconád
5. Boldog
6. Csány
7. Ecséd
8. Erdőtelek
9. Erk
10. Gyöngyöshalász
11. Hatvan
12. Heréd
13. Heves
14. Hevesvezekény
15. Hort
16. Karácsond
17. Kerekharaszt
18. Kisköre
19. Lőrinci
20. Ludas
21. Nagyfüged
22. Nagykökényes
23. Nagyréde
24. Nagyút
25. Pély
26. Petőfibánya
27. Rózsaszentmárton
28. Szűcsi
29. Tarnabod
30. Tarnaméra
31. Tarnaörs
32. Tarnaszentmiklós
33. Tarnazsadány
34. Tenk
35. Vámosgyörk
36. Visznek
37. Zagyvaszántó
38. Zaránk

== History ==
The 3rd constituency of Heves County was created in 2011 and consisted of the pre-2011 abolished constituencies of 4th and 5th and part of 3rd constituency of this County. Its borders have not changed since its creation.

== Members ==
The constituency was first represented by Zsolt Szabó of the Fidesz from 2014, and he was re-elected in 2018 and 2022. In the 2026 election, Áron Juhász of the Tisza Party was elected representative.

Election	Member	Party	%	Ref.
2014	Zsolt Szabó	Fidesz	41.18	
2018	Zsolt Szabó	Fidesz	50.75	
2022	Zsolt Szabó	Fidesz	59.06	
2026	Áron Juhász	TISZA	50.99	

== Election result ==
=== 2022 election ===
Result 2022
1. Zsolt Szabó, Fidesz–KDNP (59.1%)
2. Lajos Kórozs, United for Hungary (29.6%)
3. Ádám Gonda, Our Homeland (9.10%)
4. Gergő Antal, MEMO (1.80%)
5. Other party (less than 1%) (0.40%)

2022 parliamentary election: Heves County - 3rd constituency
Party	Candidate	Votes	%	±%
Fidesz–KDNP	Zsolt Szabó	30,863	59.06	+8.31
United for Hungary	Lajos Kórozs	15,450	29.56	
Mi Hazánk	Ádám Gonda	4,746	9.08	New
MEMO	Gergő Antal	952	1.82	New
Leftist Alliance	Istvánné Kovács	248	0.47	
Majority		15,413	29.5	
Turnout		53,094	66.65	▼1.17
Registered electors		79,655		
Fidesz–KDNP hold		Swing	+13.9	

=== 2018 election ===
Result 2018
1. Zsolt Szabó, Fidesz–KDNP (50.8%)
2. Tamás Sneider, Jobbik (35.2%)
3. Norbert Tóth, MSZP-P (8.70%)
4. Norbert Tóth, LMP (3.10%)
5. Tibor Déri, Momentum (1.00%)
6. Other parties (less than 1%) (1.20%)

2018 parliamentary election: Heves County - 3rd constituency
Party	Candidate	Votes	%	±%
Fidesz–KDNP	Zsolt Szabó	27,726	50.75	+9.57
Jobbik	Tamás Sneider	19,219	35.18	+4.21
MSZP–Dialogue	Norbert Tóth	4,755	8.7	as Unity
LMP	Norbert Tóth	1,703	3.12	+0.86
Momentum	Tibor Déri	547	1.0	New
Family Party	Rita Kovács	252	0.46	
Medete Party	Dániel Jenő Földi	90	0.16	
Motherland Party	Mihály Erdős	79	0.14	
Order Party	Gézáné Jambrik	77	0.14	
ÖP	Gábor Kiss	46	0.08	−0.11
KÖSSZ	Zsanett Galcsik	45	0.08	
Lendülettel	János Ignác Bakos	39	0.07	
EU.ROM	Róbert Rézműves	27	0.05	
Iránytű	Miklós Forgó	27	0.05	
Majority		8,507	15.57	
Turnout		55,256	67.82	▲7.88
Registered electors		81,475		
Fidesz–KDNP hold		Swing	+5.4	

=== 2014 election ===
Result 2014
1. Zsolt Szabó, Fidesz–KDNP (41.2%)
2. Tamás Sneider, Jobbik (31.0%)
3. Lajos Kórozs, Unity (21.9%)
4. Norbert Tóth, LMP (2.30%)
5. Róbert Ivanics, Independent (1.30%)
6. Other parties (less than 1%) (2.30%)

2014 parliamentary election: Heves County - 3rd constituency
Party	Candidate	Votes	%	±%
Fidesz–KDNP	Zsolt Szabó	20,304	41.18	
Jobbik	Tamás Sneider	15,268	30.97	
Unity	Lajos Kórozs	10,797	21.9	
LMP	Norbert Tóth	1,114	2.26	
Independent	Róbert Ivanics	622	1.26	
KTI	Ferenc Botos	251	0.51	
SEM	Andrea Fehér	166	0.34	
SMS	Erika Ránics	163	0.33	
MCP	Ferenc Burai	160	0.32	
Soc Dems	János Molnár	110	0.22	
ÖP	Gábor Kiss	94	0.19	
FKGP	Károly Oláh	67	0.14	
MSZDP	Dr. László Kaponyi	55	0.11	
KMSZ	István Szőcs	54	0.11	
Rend, Szabadság	Enikő Tóth-Kern	31	0.06	
NÉP	János Mikó	21	0.04	
MDU	Péter Ács	15	0.03	
HATMAP	Zsolt László	13	0.03	
Majority		5,036	10.21	
Turnout		49,947	59.94	
Registered electors		83,335		
Fidesz–KDNP win (new seat)				
