= József Tóth (politician, born 1953) =

Hungarian agronomist and politician (born 1953)

Member of the National Assembly
- In office 14 May 2010 – 5 May 2014

Personal details
- Born: 21 February 1953 (age 73) Tiszanána, Hungary
- Party: Fidesz
- Profession: agronomist, politician

Dr. József Tóth (born 21 February 1953) is a Hungarian agronomist and politician, mayor of Tiszanána since 1994 and member of the National Assembly (MP) for Heves (Heves County Constituency V) from 2010 to 2014.
