= Heves District =

District in south-eastern Heves County in Hungary

Coordinates: 47.6000°N 20.3500°E

Heves District Hevesi járás
- Districts of Hungary
- Coat of arms

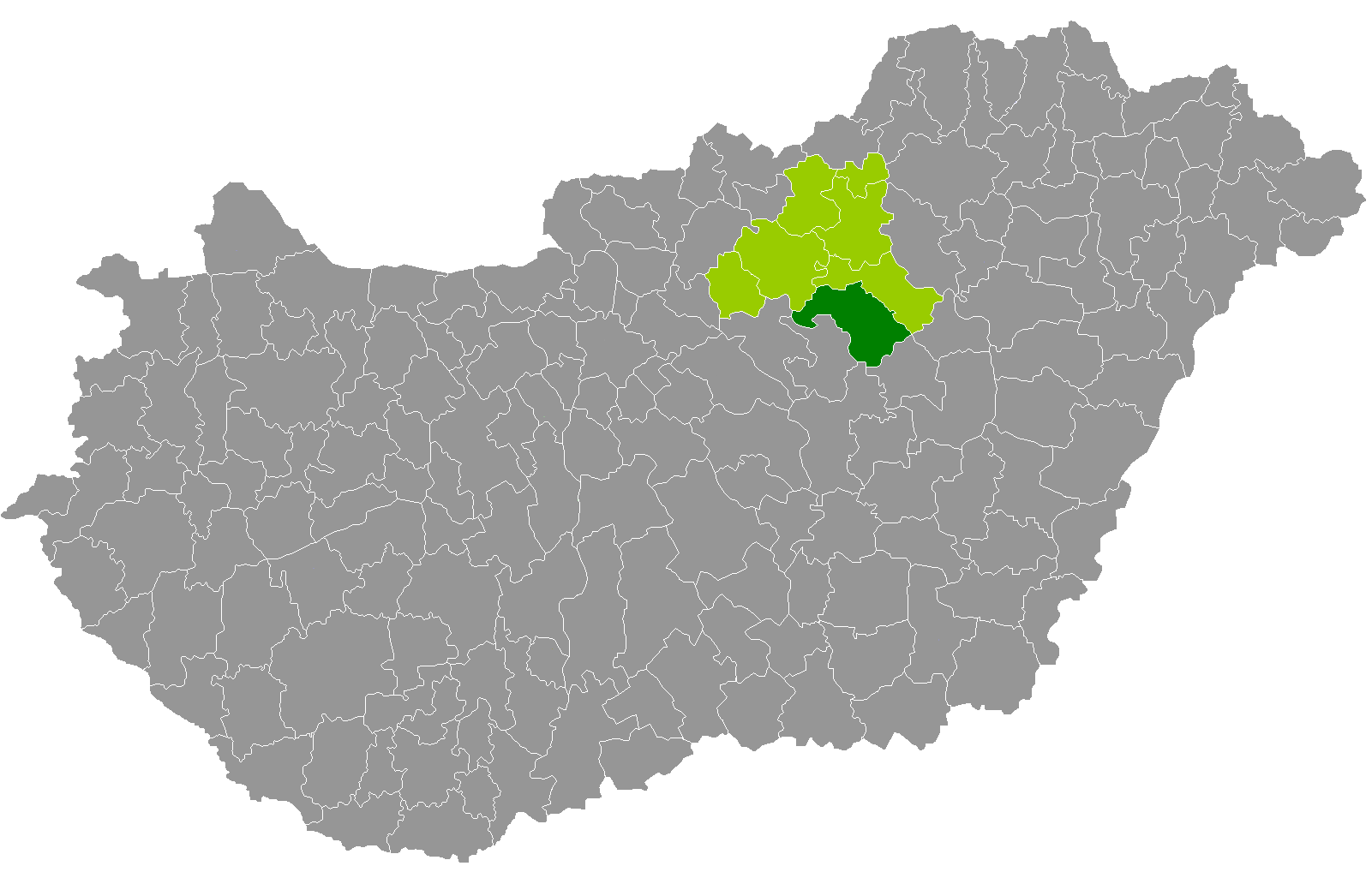
- Heves District within Hungary and Heves County.
- Country: Hungary
- County: Heves
- District seat: Heves (town)

Area
  - Total: 697.68 km^{2} (269.38 sq mi)
  - Rank: 2nd in Heves

Population (2011 census)
  - Total: 35,036
  - Rank: 4th in Heves
  - Density: 50/km^{2} (130/sq mi)

Heves (Hungarian: Hevesi járás) is a district in south-eastern part of Heves County. Heves is also the name of the town where the district seat is found. The district is located in the Northern Hungary Statistical Region.

== Geography ==
Heves District borders with Füzesabony District to the northeast, Kunhegyes District (Jász-Nagykun-Szolnok County) to the southeast, Jászapáti District (Jász-Nagykun-Szolnok County) to the southwest, Gyöngyös District to the northwest. The number of the inhabited places in Heves District is 17.

== Municipalities ==
The district has 2 towns and 15 villages. (ordered by population, as of 1 January 2012)

- Átány (1,351)
- Boconád (1,248)
- Erdőtelek (3,174)
- Erk (881)
- **Heves** (10,464) – district seat
- Hevesvezekény (611)
- **Kisköre** (2,653)
- Kömlő (1,743)
- Pély (1,291)
- Tarnabod (662)
- Tarnaméra (1,603)
- Tarnaörs (1,804)
- Tarnaszentmiklós (820)
- Tarnazsadány (1,192)
- Tenk (1,166)
- Tiszanána (2,309)
- Zaránk (410)

The bolded municipalities are cities.

== Demographics ==
Religion in Heves District (2011 census)
1. Catholic Church (54.4%)
2. Greek Catholicism (0.20%)
3. Calvinism (5.50%)
4. Lutheranism (0.20%)
5. Other religions (1.30%)
6. Non-religious (14.5%)
7. Atheists (0.40%)
8. Undeclared (23.5%)

In 2011, it had a population of 35,036 and the population density was 50/km^{2}.

Year	County population	Change
2011	35,036	n/a

=== Ethnicity ===
Besides the Hungarian majority, the main minority is the Roma (approx. 5,500).

Total population (2011 census): 35,036
Ethnic groups (2011 census): Identified themselves: 35,799 persons:

- Hungarians: 30,343 (84.76%)
- Gypsies: 5,182 (14.48%)
- Others and indefinable: 274 (0.77%)

Approx. 1,000 persons in Heves District did declare more than one ethnic group at the 2011 census.

=== Religion ===
Religious adherence in the county according to 2011 census:

- Catholic – 19,112 (Roman Catholic – 19,045; Greek Catholic – 64);
- Reformed – 1,932;
- Evangelical – 66;
- other religions – 454;
- Non-religious – 5,095;
- Atheism – 158;
- Undeclared – 8,219.

== Gallery ==
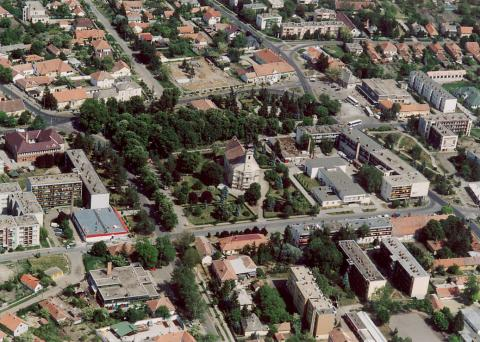
Heves, the district seat

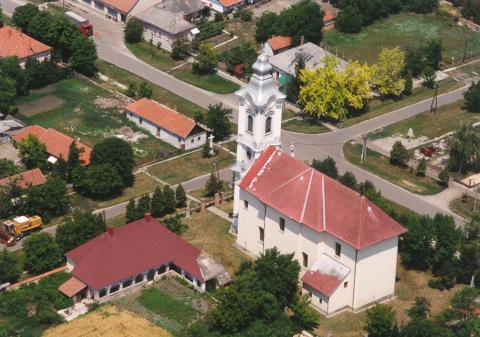
Aerial view of Kömlő

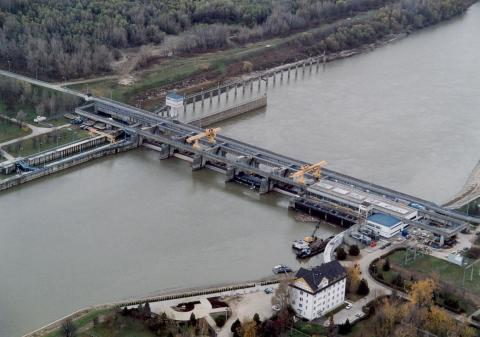
Tisza Dam in Kisköre

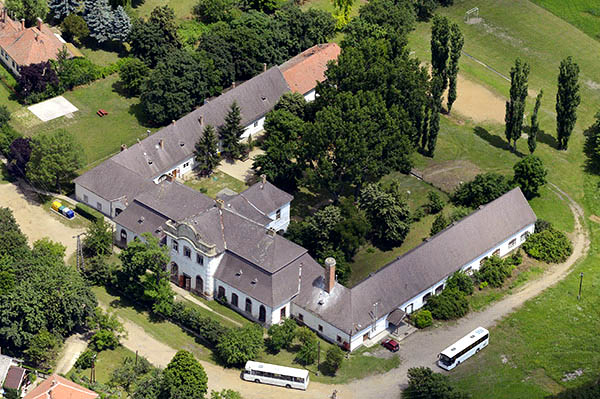
Szeleczky Mansion in Boconád

== See also ==
- List of cities and towns of Hungary
