= Kömlő =

- Village (község)
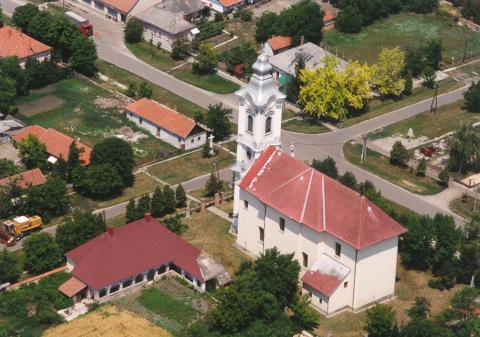

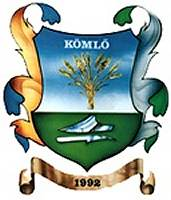
- Coat of arms

- Location of Heves County in Hungary

- Location of Kömlő in Hungary
- Coordinates: 47°36′04″N 20°26′28″E
- Country: Hungary
- Region: Northern Hungary
- County: Heves County
- Subregion: Heves District

Government
  - Mayor: Tamás Turó

Area
  - Total: 45.22 km^{2} (17.46 sq mi)

Population (1 Jan. 2015)
  - Total: 1,881
  - Density: 38.81/km^{2} (100.5/sq mi)
- Time zone: UTC+1 (CET)
  - Summer (DST): UTC+2 (CEST)
- Postal code: 3372
- Area code: 36
- Website: falvak.hu/komlo

Kömlő is a village in Heves County, Northern Hungary Region, Hungary.

From 1600 to 1770 it was uninhabited.

== See also ==
- List of populated places in Hungary
