= Balaton (village) =

- Village (község)
- Location of Heves County in Hungary

- Location of Balaton in Hungary
- Coordinates: 48°05′34″N 20°18′22″E
- Country: Hungary
- Region: Northern Hungary
- County: Heves County
- Subregion: Bélapátfalva District

Government
  - Mayor: Enikő Murányi Udzeliné

Area
  - Total: 13.2 km^{2} (5.1 sq mi)

Population (1 Jan. 2015)
  - Total: 1,053
  - Density: 78.26/km^{2} (202.7/sq mi)
- Time zone: UTC+1 (CET)
  - Summer (DST): UTC+2 (CEST)
- Postal code: 3347
- Area code: 36

Balaton is a village in Heves County, Northern Hungary Region, Hungary.

== Parts ==
- Balaton
- Illésvölgyitanya
- Tárcatanya
- Zsólyomtanya

== Sights ==
- The Catholic church

== See also ==
- List of populated places in Hungary
