= Átány =

- Község
- Location of Heves County in Hungary

- Location of Átány in Hungary Location of Átány in Heves County
- Coordinates: 47°36′58″N 20°21′49″E
- Country: Hungary
- County: Heves
- District: Heves (district)

Government
  - Mayor: Mihály Gönczi

Area
  - Total: 50.44 km^{2} (19.47 sq mi)

Population (1 Jan 2015)
  - Total: 1,490
- Time zone: UTC+1 (CET)
  - Summer (DST): UTC+2 (CEST)
- Postal code: 3371
- area code: 36

Átány is a village in Heves County, Hungary.
