= Ostoros =

- Village (község)
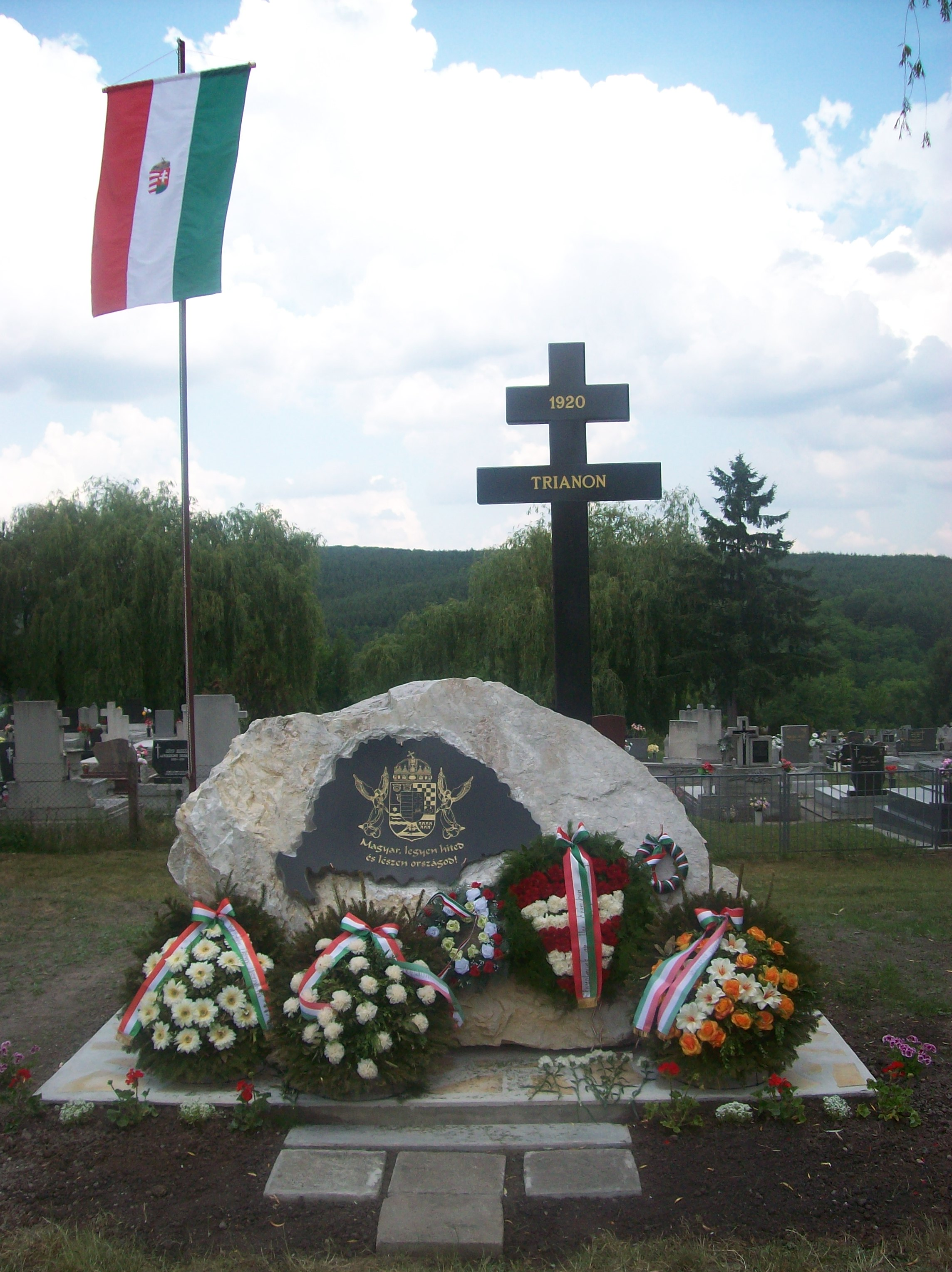
- Memorial monument of Ostoros

- Coat of arms

- Location of Heves County in Hungary

- Location of Ostoros in Hungary
- Coordinates: 47°52′01″N 20°25′44″E
- Country: Hungary
- Region: Northern Hungary
- County: Heves County
- Subregion: Eger

Government
  - Mayor: László Böjt (Ind.)

Area
  - Total: 23.51 km^{2} (9.08 sq mi)
- Elevation: 190 m (620 ft)

Population (2015)
  - Total: 2,577
  - Density: 114.08/km^{2} (295.5/sq mi)
- Time zone: UTC+1 (CET)
  - Summer (DST): UTC+2 (CEST)
- Postal code: 3326
- Area code: 36
- Website: http://ostoros.hu/

Ostoros is a village in Heves County, Northern Hungary Region, Hungary.
