= Boconád =

- Village (község)
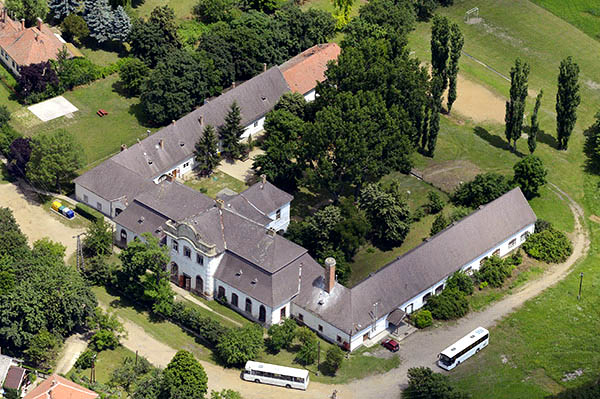
- Szeleczky castle

- Location of Heves County in Hungary

- Location of Boconád in Hungary
- Coordinates: 47°38′34″N 20°11′17″E
- Country: Hungary
- Region: Northern Hungary
- County: Heves County
- Subregion: Heves District

Government
  - Mayor: István Kis

Area
  - Total: 29.56 km^{2} (11.41 sq mi)

Population (1 Jan. 2015)
  - Total: 1,274
  - Density: 43.23/km^{2} (112.0/sq mi)
- Time zone: UTC+1 (CET)
  - Summer (DST): UTC+2 (CEST)
- Postal code: 3368
- Area code: 36
- Website: www.boconad.hu

Boconád is a village in Heves County, Northern Hungary Region, Hungary.

== Sights to visit ==
- Statue of John of Nepomuk
- Baroque ensemble of Szeleczky castle

== See also ==
- List of populated places in Hungary
