= Novaj, Hungary =

Novaj
- Village (község)
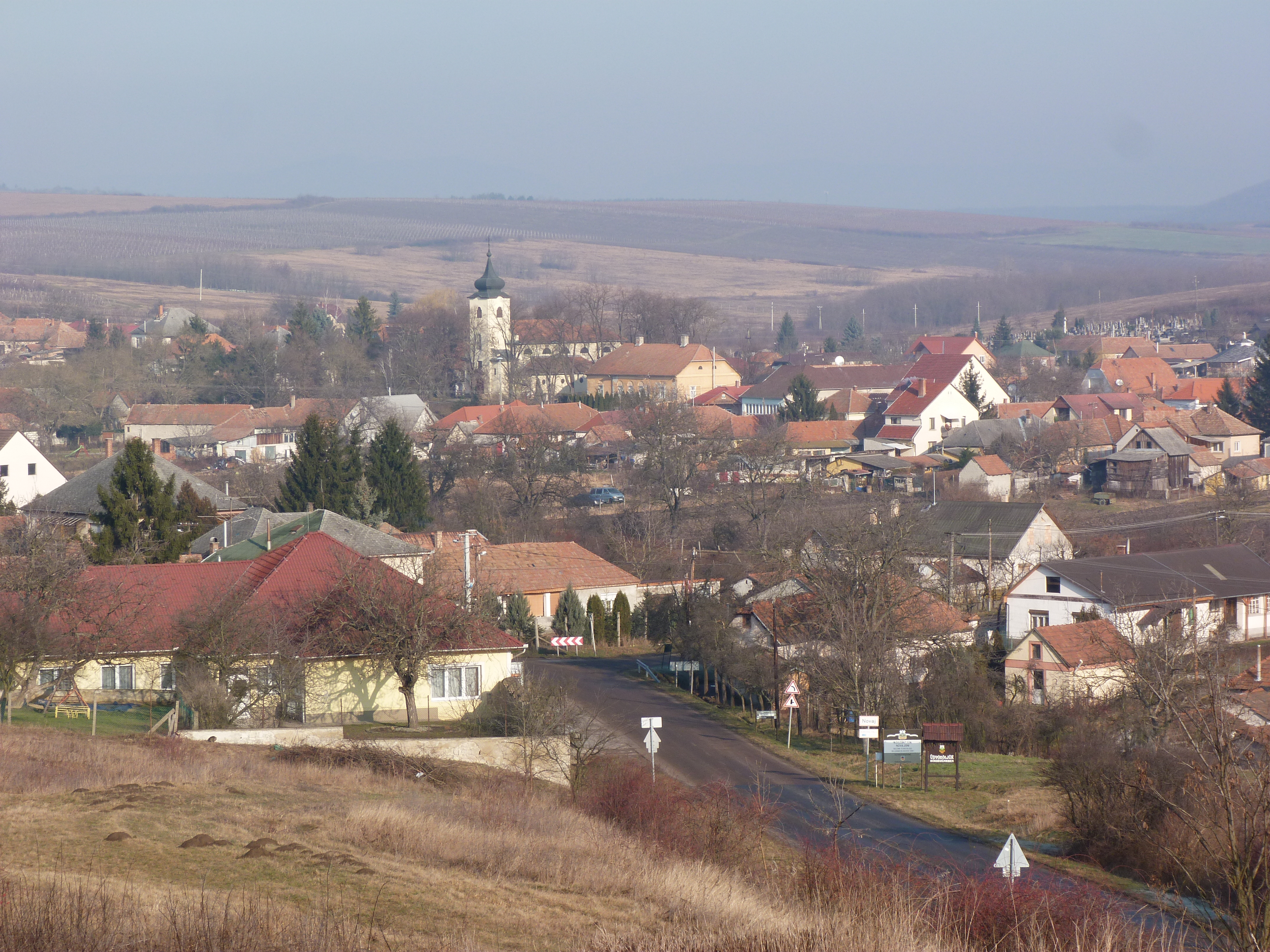

- Location of Heves County in Hungary

- Location of Novaj in Hungary
- Coordinates: 47°51′29″N 20°28′41″E
- Country: Hungary
- Region: Northern Hungary
- County: Heves County
- Subregion: Bélapátfalva District

Government
  - Mayor: Gábor Demkó

Area
  - Total: 18.25 km^{2} (7.05 sq mi)

Population (1 Jan. 2015)
  - Total: 1,332
  - Density: 70.68/km^{2} (183.1/sq mi)
- Time zone: UTC+1 (CET)
  - Summer (DST): UTC+2 (CEST)
- Postal code: 3327
- Area code: 36
- Website: www.novaj.hu

Novaj is a village in Heves County, Northern Hungary Region, Hungary.

== Sights to visit ==
- church
