= Erk, Hungary =

Erk
- Village (község)
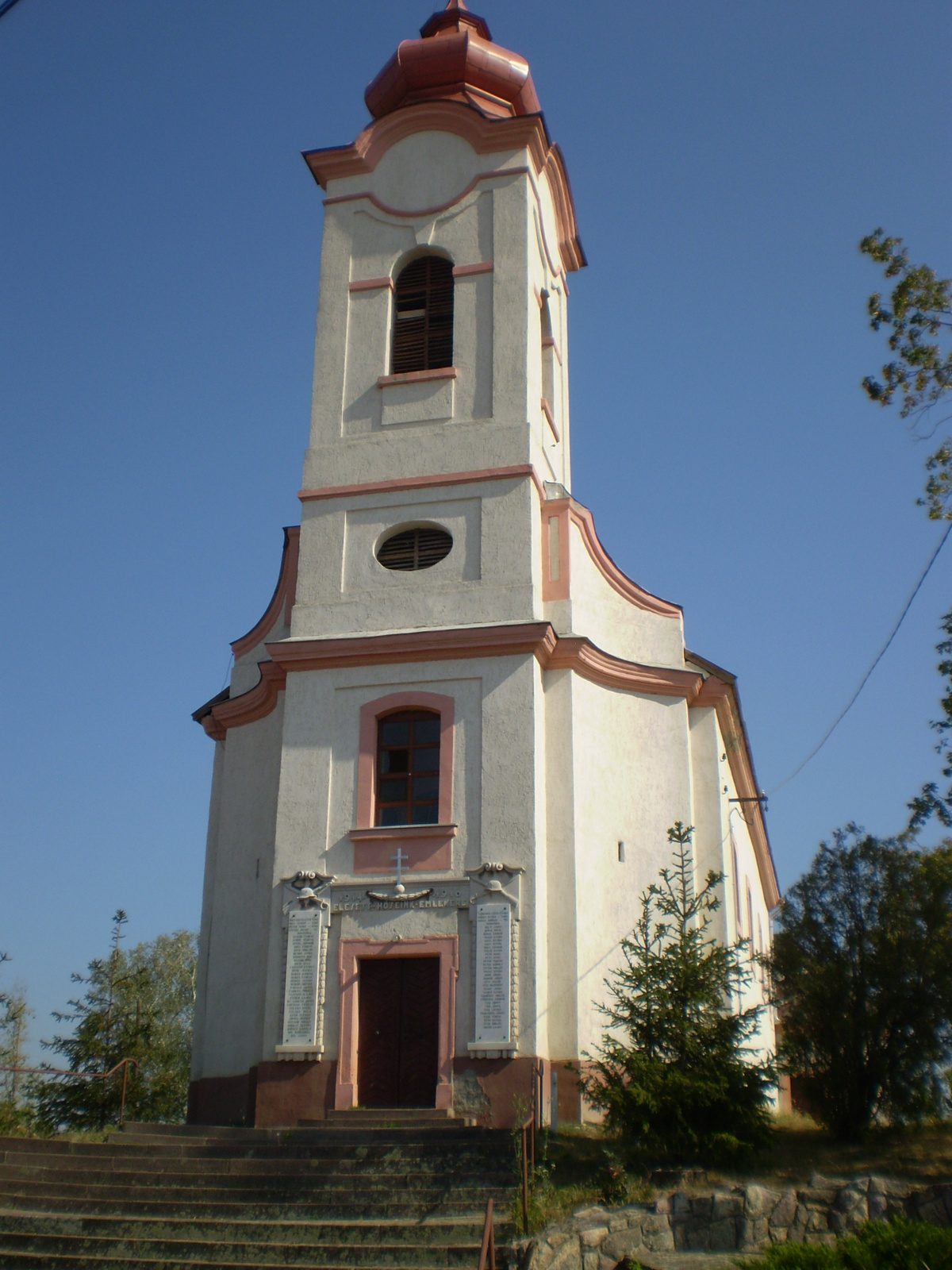

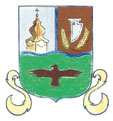
- Coat of arms

- Location of Heves County in Hungary

- Location of Erk in Hungary
- Coordinates: 47°36′32″N 20°04′39″E
- Country: Hungary
- Region: Northern Hungary
- County: Heves County
- Subregion: Heves District

Government
  - Mayor: Béla Meleghegyi

Area
  - Total: 21.68 km^{2} (8.37 sq mi)

Population (1 Jan. 2015)
  - Total: 935
  - Density: 42.9/km^{2} (111/sq mi)
- Time zone: UTC+1 (CET)
  - Summer (DST): UTC+2 (CEST)
- Postal code: 3295
- Area code: 36

Erk is a village in Heves County, Northern Hungary Region, Hungary.

== Sights to visit ==
- The catholic church
- Wind Farm

== See also ==
- List of populated places in Hungary
