= Áron Juhász =

Hungarian politician

Member of the National Assembly
- Incumbent
- Assumed office 9 May 2026
- Preceded by: Zsolt Szabó
- Constituency: Heves 3rd

Personal details
- Party: Tisza

Áron Juhász is a Hungarian politician who was elected member of the National Assembly in 2026 representing the Heves County 3rd constituency. He previously worked as a pharmacist.
