= Erdőtelek =

- Village (község)
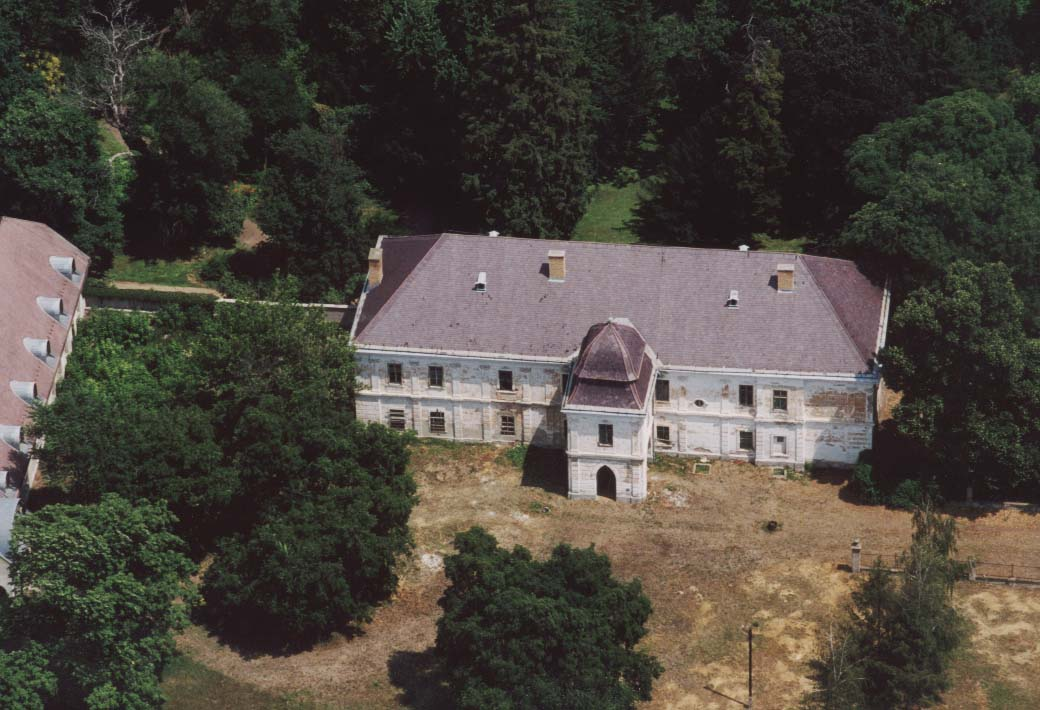

- Coat of arms

- Location of Heves County in Hungary

- Location of Erdőtelek in Hungary
- Coordinates: 47°40′59″N 20°19′01″E
- Country: Hungary
- Region: Northern Hungary
- County: Heves County
- District: Heves District

Government
  - Mayor: Muckó (Ind.)

Area
  - Total: 44.9 km^{2} (17.3 sq mi)

Population (1 Jan. 2015)
  - Total: 3,212
  - Density: 72/km^{2} (190/sq mi)
- Time zone: UTC+1 (CET)
  - Summer (DST): UTC+2 (CEST)
- Postal code: 3358
- Area code: 36
- Website: http://erdotelek.hu/

Erdőtelek is a village in Heves County, Hungary.
