= Heréd =

- Village (község)
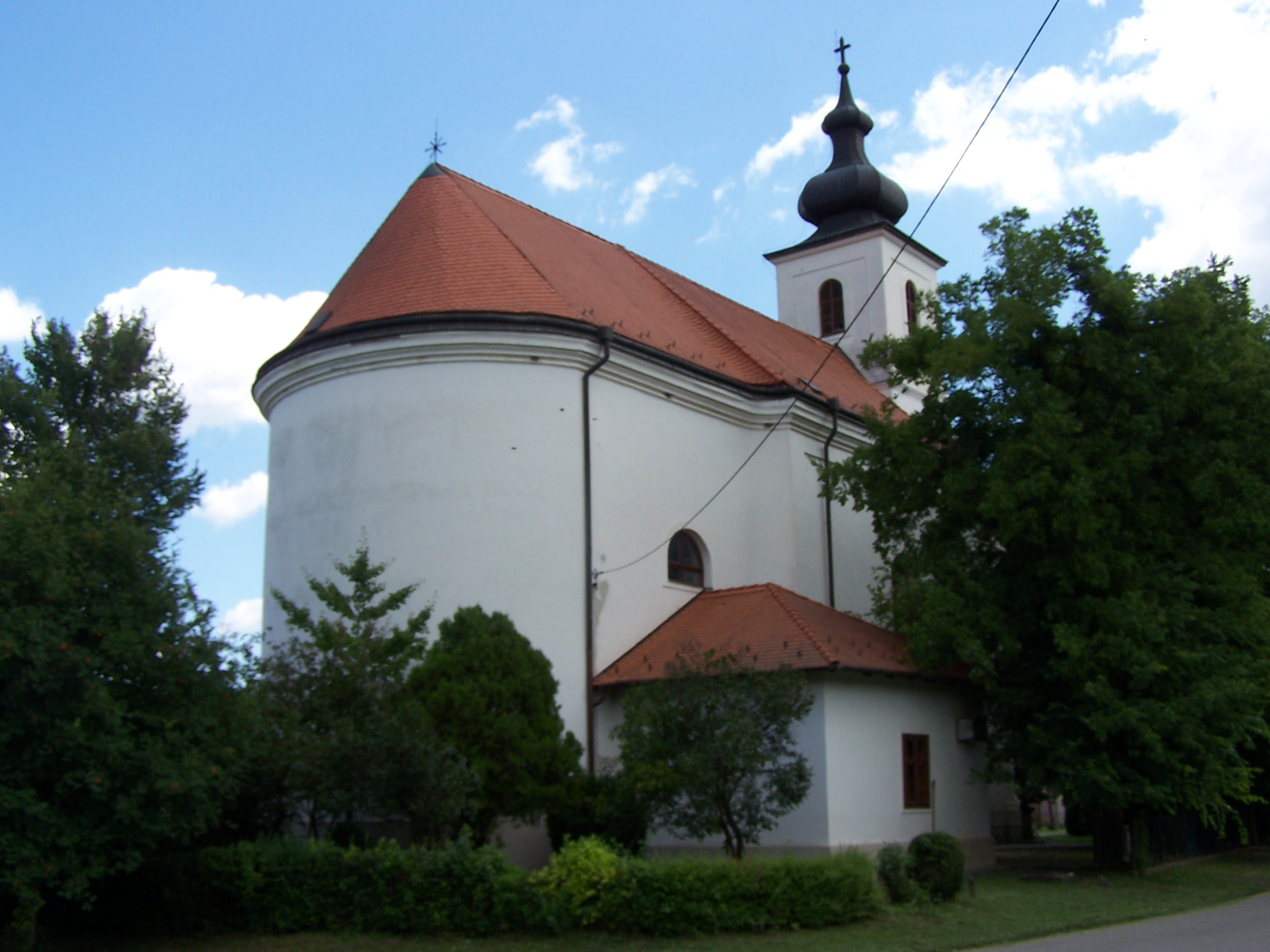
- The Roman Catholic Church of Heréd

- Coat of arms

- Location of Heves County in Hungary

- Location in Hungary
- Coordinates: 47°42′32″N 19°37′55″E
- Country: Hungary
- Region: Northern Hungary
- County: Heves County
- District: Hatvan

Government
  - Mayor: Kómár József László (Fidesz-KDNP)

Area
  - Total: 13.96 km^{2} (5.39 sq mi)

Population (2015)
  - Total: 1,877
  - Density: 134.5/km^{2} (348.2/sq mi)
- Time zone: UTC+1 (CET)
  - Summer (DST): UTC+2 (CEST)
- Postal code: 3011
- Area code: 37
- Website: http://www.hered.hu/

Heréd is a village in Heves County, in the Northern Hungary Region of Hungary.
