= Nagyfüged =

- Village (község)
- Coat of arms

- Location of Heves County in Hungary

- Location of Nagyfüged in Hungary
- Coordinates: 47°41′15″N 20°06′23″E
- Country: Hungary
- Region: Northern Hungary
- County: Heves County
- Subregion: Gyöngyös District
- First mentioned: 1301

Government
  - Mayor: Juhász Jánosné

Area
  - Total: 27.51 km^{2} (10.62 sq mi)

Population (1 Jan. 2015)
  - Total: 1,615
  - Density: 60.34/km^{2} (156.3/sq mi)
- Time zone: UTC+1 (CET)
  - Summer (DST): UTC+2 (CEST)
- Postal code: 3282
- Area code: 37
- Website: http://nagyfuged.hu/

Nagyfüged is a village in Heves County, in the Northern Hungary region of Hungary.
