= Pély =

- Village/község
- Coat of arms

- Location of Pély in Hungary
- Coordinates: 47°29′38″N 20°20′35″E
- County: Heves
- District: Heves (district)

Government
  - Mayor: Péter Bakondi

Area
  - Total: 90.3 km^{2} (34.9 sq mi)

Population (1 Jan 2015)
  - Total: 1,359
- Time zone: UTC+1 (CET)
  - Summer (DST): UTC+2 (CEST)
- Postal code: 3381
- area code: 36
- Website: pély.hu

Pély is a village in Heves County, Hungary.

== Notable residents ==
- Zsuzsa Körmöczy (1924–2006), World No. 2 women's tennis player
- Mari Törőcsik, actress
