= Tarnaméra =

- Village/község
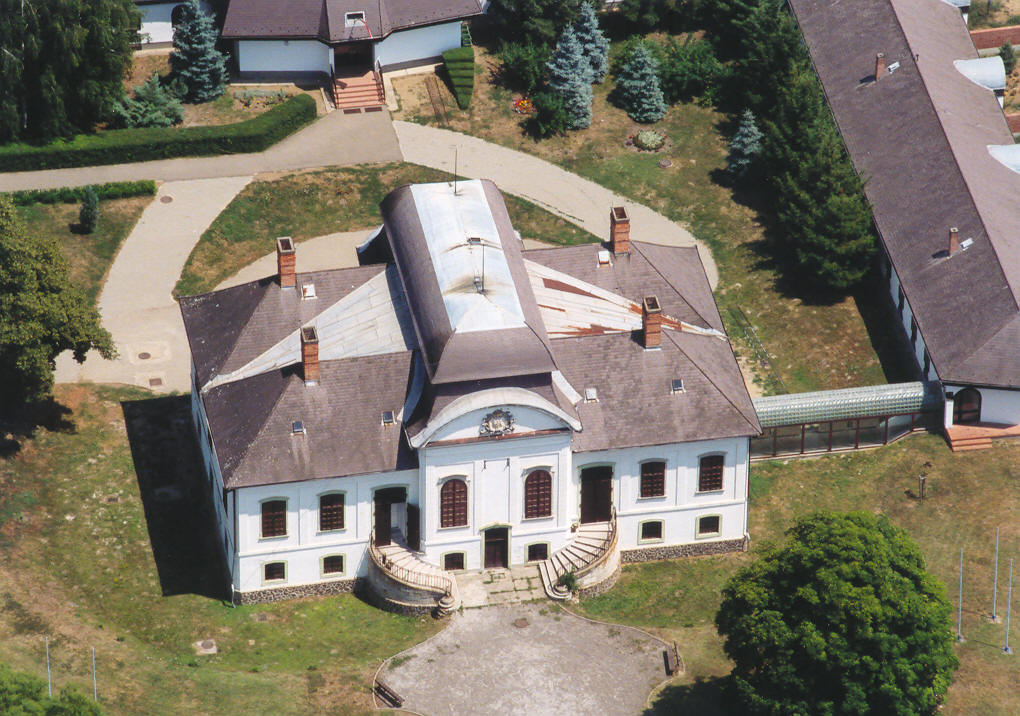
- The Almássy mansion in Tarnaméra

- Coat of arms

- Location of Heves County in Hungary

- Location of Tarnaméra in Hungary
- Coordinates: 47°39′22″N 20°09′29″E
- Country: Hungary
- Region: Northern Hungary
- County: Heves County
- Subregion: Heves
- First mentioned: 1334

Government
  - Mayor: László Timár

Area
  - Total: 28.26 km^{2} (10.91 sq mi)
- Elevation: 100 m (330 ft)

Population (2015)
  - Total: 1,659
  - Density: 57.29/km^{2} (148.4/sq mi)
- Time zone: UTC+1 (CET)
  - Summer (DST): UTC+2 (CEST)
- Postal code: 3284
- area code: 36
- Website: http://www.tarnamera.hu/

Tarnaméra is a village (község) in Heves County, Northern Hungary Region, Hungary.
