= Tarnaörs =

- Village/község
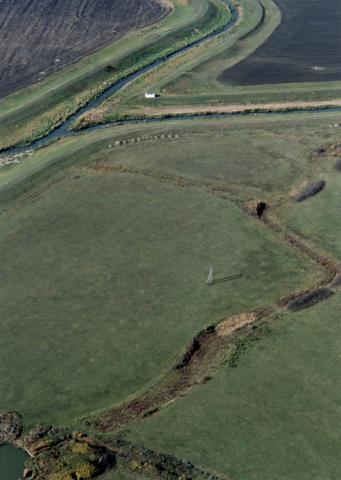
- Aerial photo of the confluence of the Tarna River and Gyögyös River near Tarnaörs

- Coat of arms

- Location of Heves County in Hungary

- Location of Tarnaörs in Hungary
- Coordinates: 47°35′53″N 20°03′22″E
- Country: Hungary
- Region: Northern Hungary
- County: Heves County
- Subregion: Heves
- First mentioned: 1264

Government
  - Mayor: János Almádi

Area
  - Total: 30.28 km^{2} (11.69 sq mi)
- Elevation: 93 m (305 ft)

Population (1 Jan 2015)
  - Total: 1 822
  - Density: 60.3/km^{2} (156/sq mi)
- Time zone: UTC+1 (CET)
  - Summer (DST): UTC+2 (CEST)
- Postal code: 3294
- area code: 36
- Website: http://www.tarnaors.hu/

Tarnaörs is a village (község) in Heves County, Northern Hungary Region, Hungary. Baroness Orczy, the author of The Scarlet Pimpernel, was born here.
