= Hevesvezekény =

- Village/község
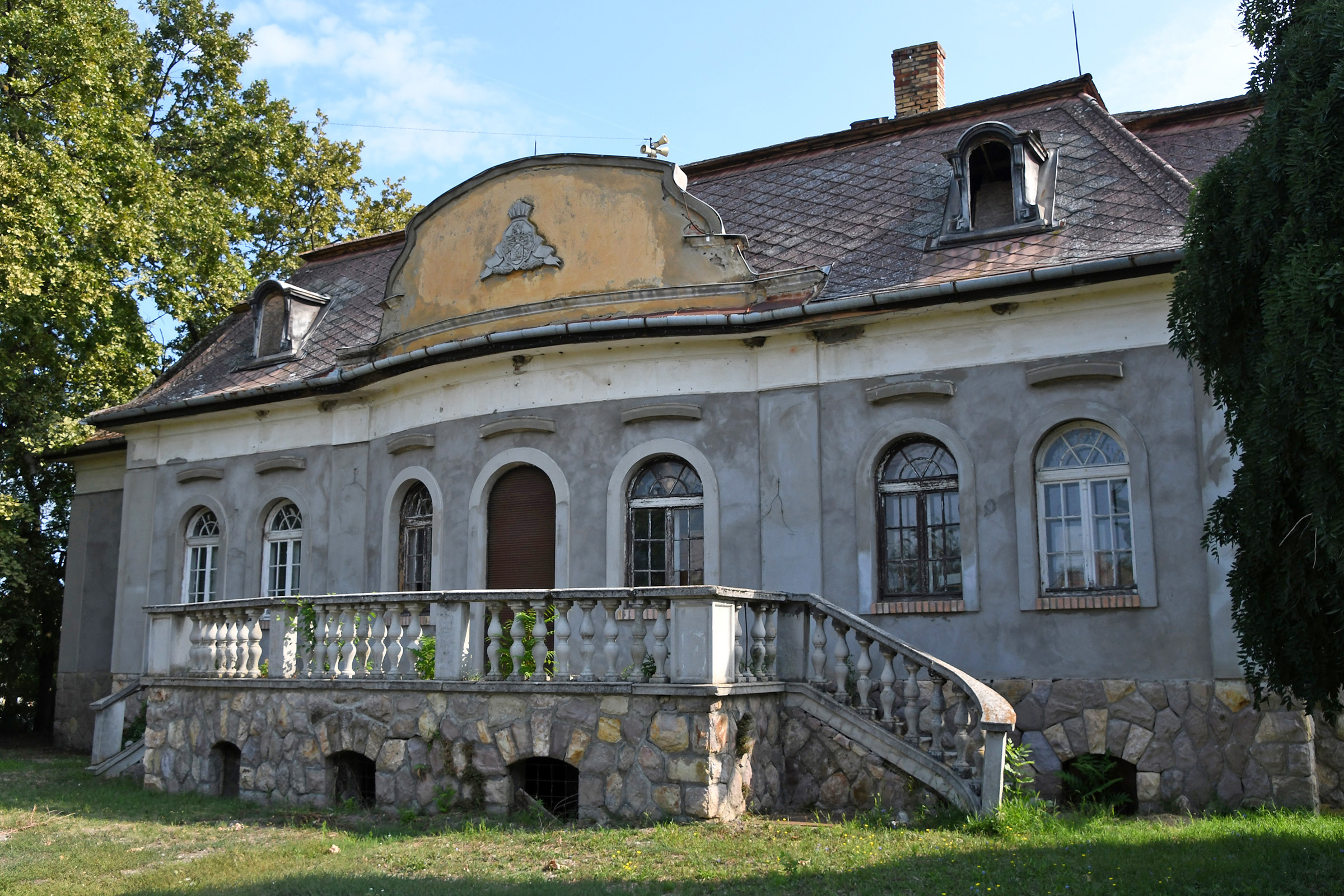
- Mlinkó mansion

- Coat of arms

- Location of Heves County in Hungary

- Location of Hevesvezekény in Hungary Hevesvezekény (Heves County)
- Coordinates: 47°33′25″N 20°21′32″E
- County: Heves
- District: Heves (district)

Government
  - Mayor: Éva Tóth

Area
  - Total: 19.78 km^{2} (7.64 sq mi)

Population (1 Jan 2015)
  - Total: 632
- Time zone: UTC+1 (CET)
  - Summer (DST): UTC+2 (CEST)
- Postal code: 3383
- area code: 36

Hevesvezekény is a village in Heves County, Hungary. Hevesvezekény has about 632 residents.
