= Tarnabod =

- Village/község
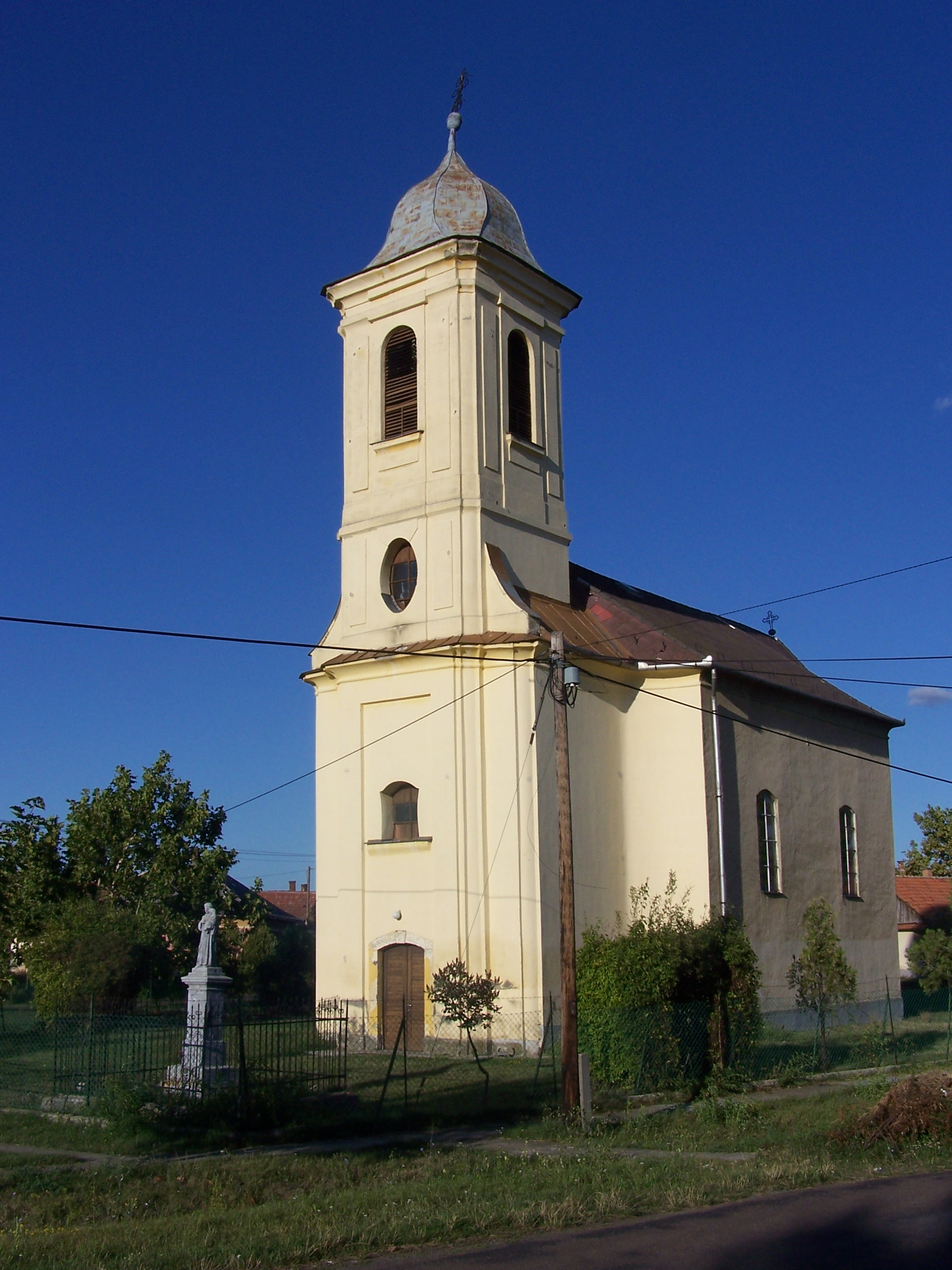

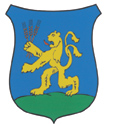
- Seal

- Location of Heves County in Hungary

- Location of Tarnabod in Hungary
- Coordinates: 47°41′6″N 20°13′26″E
- County: Heves
- District: Heves (district)

Government
  - Mayor: Sándor Pető

Area
  - Total: 63.99 km^{2} (24.71 sq mi)

Population (1 Jan 2015)
  - Total: 629
- Time zone: UTC+1 (CET)
  - Summer (DST): UTC+2 (CEST)
- Postal code: 3369
- area code: 36

Tarnabod is a village in Heves County, Hungary.
