= Tarnazsadány =

- Village (község)
- Location of Heves County in Hungary

- Location in Hungary
- Coordinates: 47°20′36″N 20°09′18″E
- Country: Hungary
- Region: Northern Hungary
- County: Heves County
- District: Heves

Government
  - Mayor: Dobi István (Ind.)

Area
  - Total: 25.19 km^{2} (9.73 sq mi)

Population (2015)
  - Total: 1,209
  - Density: 48.00/km^{2} (124.3/sq mi)
- Time zone: UTC+1 (CET)
  - Summer (DST): UTC+2 (CEST)
- Postal code: 3283
- Area code: 36
- Website: tarnazsadany.hu

Tarnazsadány is a village in Heves County, Hungary.
