= Adács =

- Village (község)
- Coat of arms

- Location of Heves County in Hungary

- Location of Adács in Hungary Location of Adács in Heves
- Coordinates: 47°41′28″N 19°58′29″E
- Country: Hungary
- Region: Northern Hungary
- County: Heves County
- Subregion: Gyöngyös District
- First mentioned: 1323

Government
  - Mayor: László Ócsai

Area
  - Total: 37.94 km^{2} (14.65 sq mi)

Population (1 Jan. 2015)
  - Total: 2,642
  - Density: 68.58/km^{2} (177.6/sq mi)
- Time zone: UTC+1 (CET)
  - Summer (DST): UTC+2 (CEST)
- Postal code: 3292
- Area code: 37
- Website: https://www.adacs.hu/

Adács is a village in Heves County, Northern Hungary Region, Hungary.

Its name comes from the old Hungarian personal name Ada, with the -cs suffix. The personal name may have its root in the ad verb, meaning "give". It was recorded as Ada in 1292.

The area was inhabited intermittently according to archaeological evidence as early as the Late Bronze Age.

Jews lived in Adács in the 18th and 19th centuries. In 1944, most of the village's Jews were murdered in the Holocaust.
