= Nagykökényes =

- Village (község)
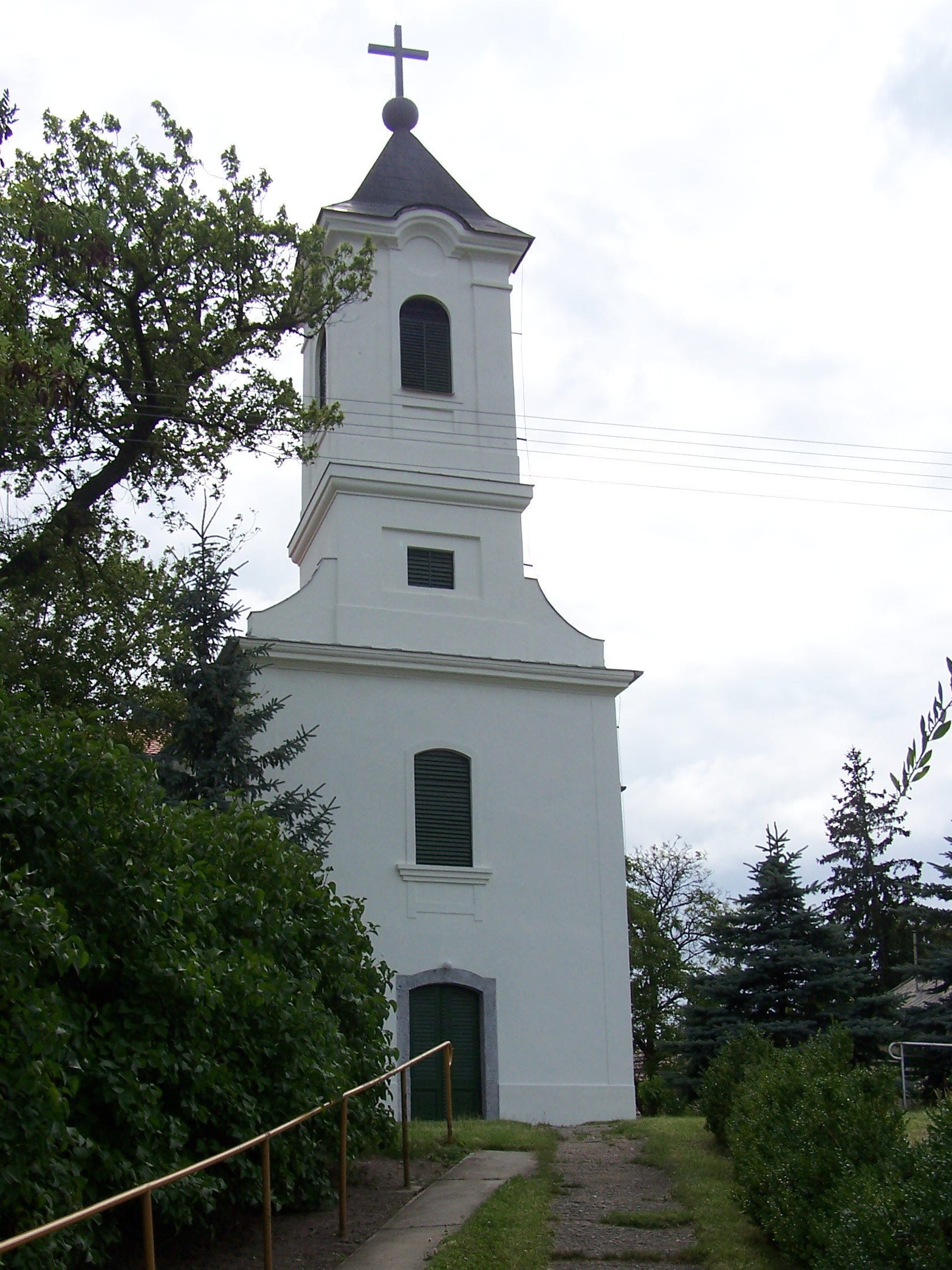

- Coat of arms

- Location in Hungary
- Coordinates: 47°44′02″N 19°35′59″E
- Country: Hungary
- Region: Northern Hungary
- County: Heves County
- District: Hatvan

Government
  - Mayor: Besszer Andrásné (Fidesz-KDNP)

Area
  - Total: 17.28 km^{2} (6.67 sq mi)

Population (2015)
  - Total: 589
  - Density: 34.1/km^{2} (88.3/sq mi)
- Time zone: UTC+1 (CET)
  - Summer (DST): UTC+2 (CEST)
- Postal code: 3012
- Area code: 37
- Website: http://www.nagykokenyes.hu/

Nagykökényes is a village in Heves County, located in the Northern Hungary Region of Hungary.
