= Tiszanána =

- Village/község
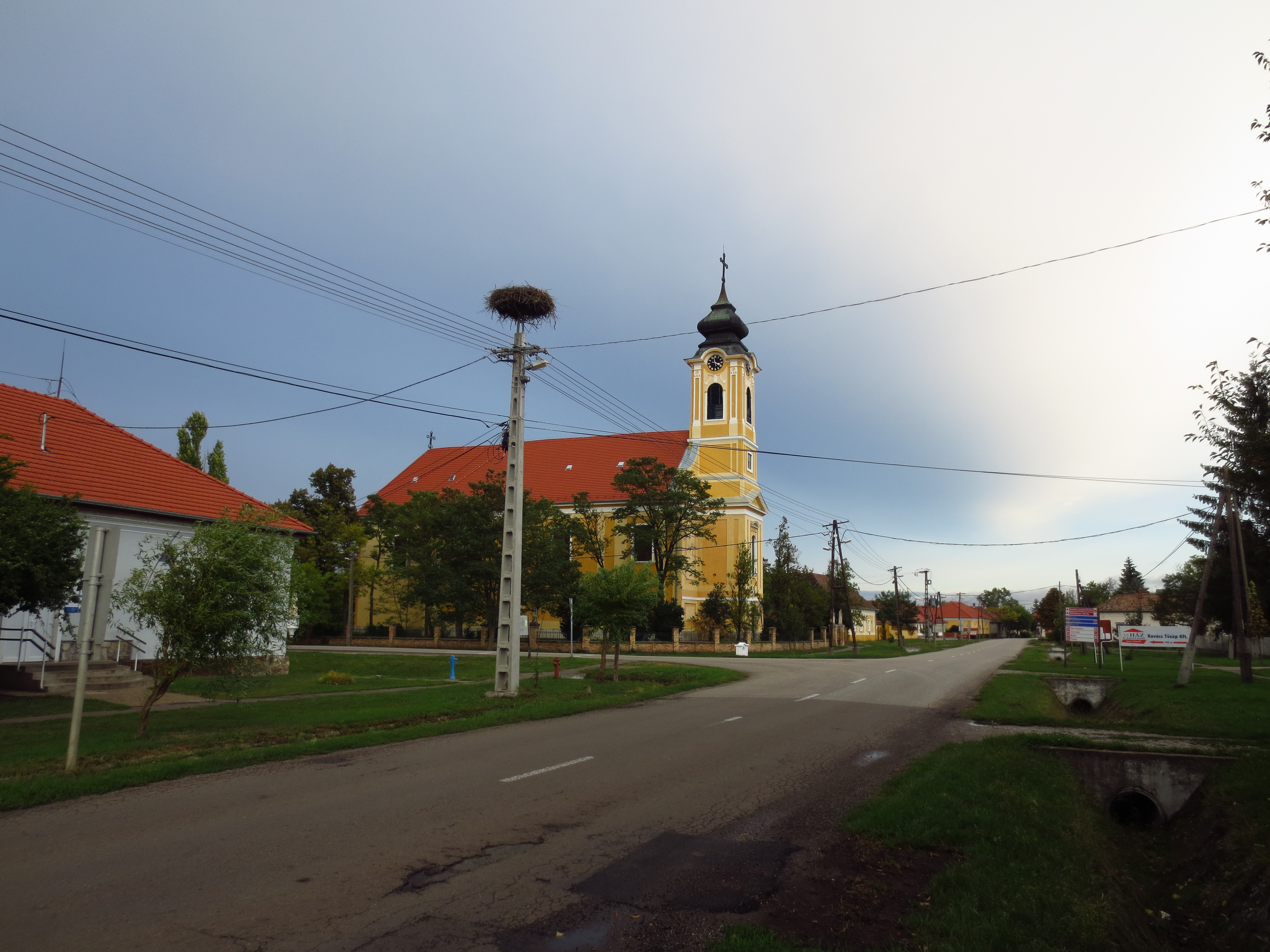

- Coat of arms

- Location of Heves County in Hungary

- Location in Hungary
- Coordinates: 47°33′40″N 20°31′23″E
- Region: Northern Hungary
- County: Heves County
- District: Heves

Government
  - Mayor: József Tóth (Fidesz-KDNP)

Area
  - Total: 68.14 km^{2} (26.31 sq mi)

Population (2015)
  - Total: 2,474
  - Density: 36.31/km^{2} (94.04/sq mi)
- Time zone: UTC+1 (CET)
  - Summer (DST): UTC+2 (CEST)
- Postal code: 3369
- Area code: 36
- Website: http://www.tiszanana.hu/

Tiszanana is a village in Heves County, Hungary.
