= Tarnaszentmiklós =

- Village (község)
- Location of Heves County in Hungary

- Location of Tarnaszentmiklós in Hungary
- Coordinates: 47°31′37″N 20°22′52″E
- Country: Hungary
- Region: Northern Hungary
- County: Heves County
- Subregion: Heves District

Government
  - Mayor: Sándorné Buda

Area
  - Total: 35 km^{2} (14 sq mi)

Population (1 Jan. 2015)
  - Total: 876
  - Density: 24.57/km^{2} (63.6/sq mi)
- Time zone: UTC+1 (CET)
  - Summer (DST): UTC+2 (CEST)
- Postal code: 3382
- Area code: 36
- Website: www.tarnaszentmiklós.hu

Tarnaszentmiklós is a village in Heves County, Northern Hungary Region, Hungary.

== Sights to visit ==
- church
- ostrich farm
