= Nagyréde =

Village in Heves, Hungary

- Village (község)
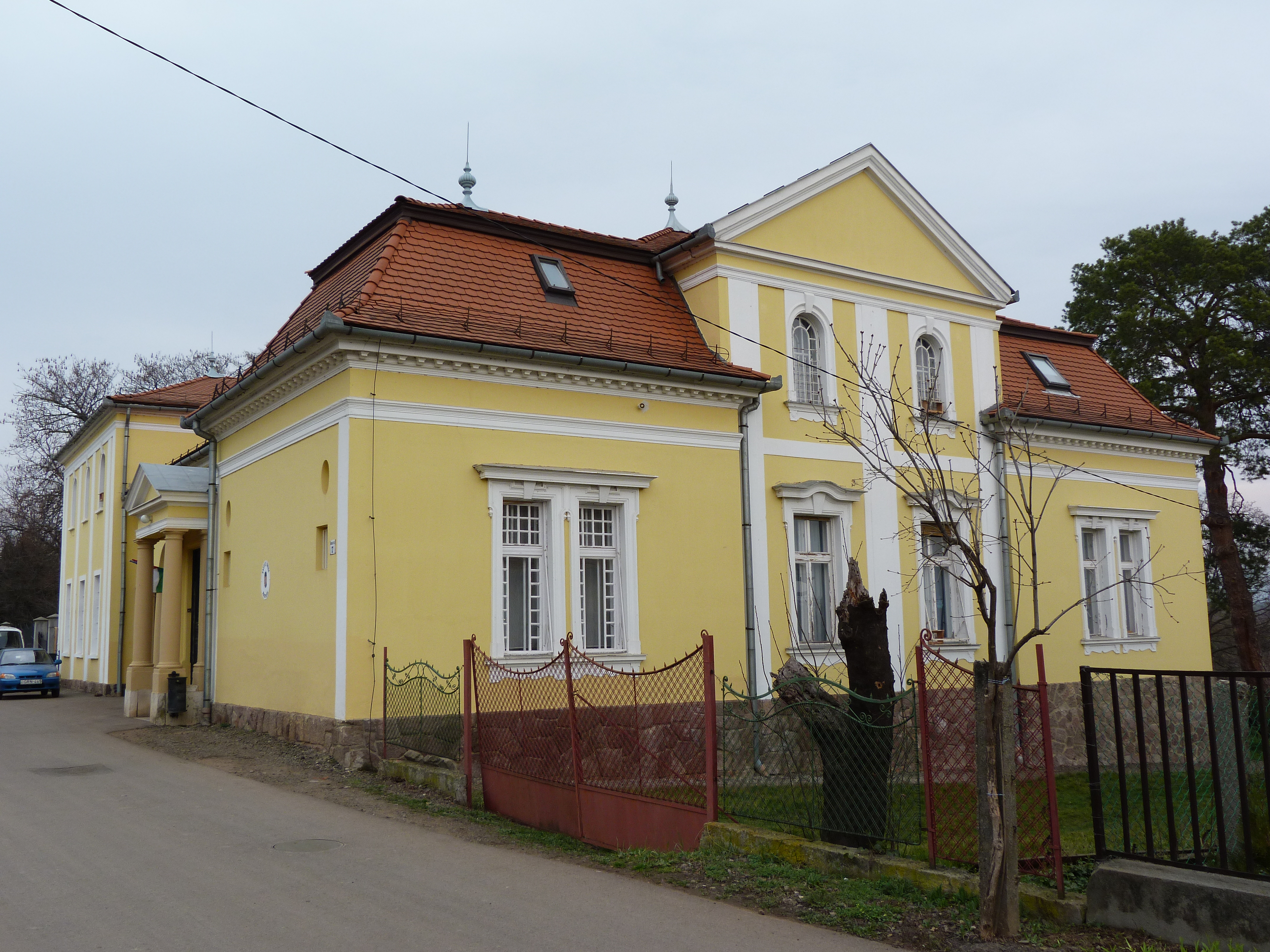
- Brezovay mansion

- Coat of arms

- Location of Heves County in Hungary

- Location in Hungary
- Coordinates: 47°46′01″N 19°51′09″E
- Country: Hungary
- Region: Northern Hungary
- County: Heves County
- District: Gyöngyös

Government
  - Mayor: Siposné Fodor Judit (Ind.)

Area
  - Total: 34.34 km^{2} (13.26 sq mi)

Population (2015)
  - Total: 3,154
  - Density: 91.85/km^{2} (237.9/sq mi)
- Time zone: UTC+1 (CET)
  - Summer (DST): UTC+2 (CEST)
- Postal code: 3214
- Area code: 37
- Website: www.nagyrede.hu

Nagyréde is a village in Heves County, Hungary.

The town is located about 8 kilometers west of Gyöngyös, next to Main road 3.
