= Visznek =

- Village (község)
- Coat of arms

- Location of Heves County in Hungary

- Location of Visznek in Hungary
- Coordinates: 47°38′31″N 20°01′37″E
- Country: Hungary
- Region: Northern Hungary
- County: Heves County
- Subregion: Gyöngyös District
- First mentioned: 1241

Government
  - Mayor: János Fodor

Area
  - Total: 49.14 km^{2} (18.97 sq mi)

Population (1 Jan. 2015)
  - Total: 1,113
  - Density: 22.73/km^{2} (58.9/sq mi)
- Time zone: UTC+1 (CET)
  - Summer (DST): UTC+2 (CEST)
- Postal code: 3293
- Area code: 37

Visznek is a village in Heves County, Northern Hungary Region, Hungary.
