= Zaránk =

- Village (község)
- Location of Heves County in Hungary

- Location in Hungary
- Coordinates: 47°38′31″N 20°06′18″E
- Country: Hungary
- Region: Northern Hungary
- County: Heves County
- District: Heves

Government
  - Mayor: László Urbán (Ind.)

Area
  - Total: 14.53 km^{2} (5.61 sq mi)

Population (2015)
  - Total: 410
  - Density: 28/km^{2} (73/sq mi)
- Time zone: UTC+1 (CET)
  - Summer (DST): UTC+2 (CEST)
- Postal code: 3296
- Area code: 36
- Website: http://www.zarank.hu/

Zaránk is a village in Heves County, Hungary.
