= Tisza Dam =

Dam in Heves, Hungary

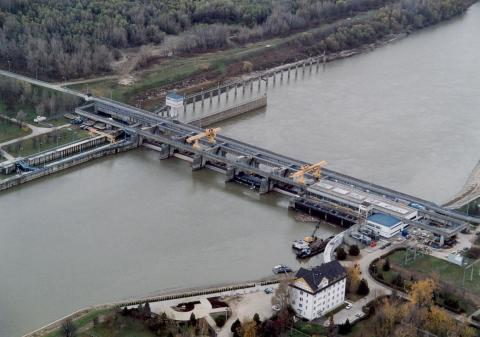

- Location within Hungary
- Country: Hungary
- Location: Kisköre, Heves county
- Coordinates: 47°29′34.66″N 20°30′56.05″E
- Purpose: Flood control, power, navigation, recreation
- Status: Operational
- Construction began: 1968
- Opening date: 1973; 53 years ago

Dam and spillways
- Type of dam: Gravity
- Impounds: Tisza River
- Height: 26 m (85 ft)

Reservoir
- Creates: Lake Tisza
- Total capacity: 228,600,000 m^{3} (185,300 acre⋅ft)
- Surface area: 119 km^{2} (46 mi^{2})

Power Station
- Operator: Tiszai Eromu Rt
- Commission date: 1973
- Turbines: 4 x 7 MW bulb
- Installed capacity: 28 MW

The Tisza Dam, also known as the Kisköre Dam, is a gravity dam on the Tisza River near Kisköre in Heves county, Hungary. It is the tallest dam in the country and also creates the largest reservoir in the country, Lake Tisza. It is a multi-purpose dam its purpose includes flood control and recreation. With a ship lock, it provides for navigation. Additionally, it supports a 28 MW hydroelectric power station, the largest in the country. Construction on the dam began in 1968 and it along with the power station were completed in 1973.
