= Tenk =

- Village (község)
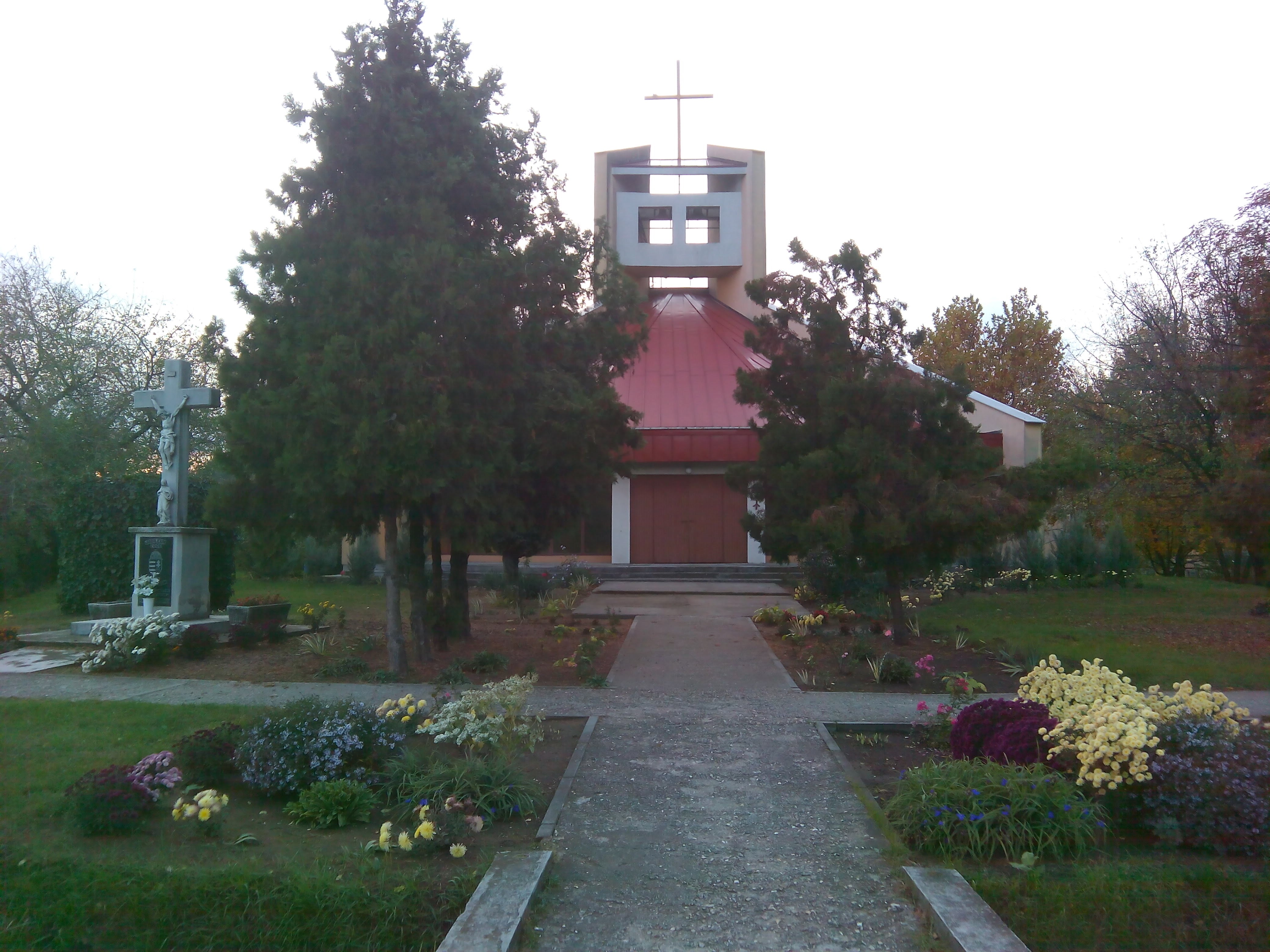

- Coat of arms

- Location of Heves County in Hungary

- Location of Tenk in Hungary
- Coordinates: 47°39′22″N 20°20′28″E
- Country: Hungary
- Region: Northern Hungary
- County: Heves County
- District: Heves District

Government
  - Mayor: Szopkó Tamás (Ind.)

Area
  - Total: 12.34 km^{2} (4.76 sq mi)

Population (1 Jan. 2015)
  - Total: 1,194
  - Density: 97/km^{2} (250/sq mi)
- Time zone: UTC+1 (CET)
  - Summer (DST): UTC+2 (CEST)
- Postal code: 3359
- Area code: 36
- Website: http://tenk.hu/

Tenk is a village in Heves County, Hungary.

== History ==
The village first appears in writing in 1310 under then name "Thenky", but it is likely the settlement existed long before then. Under Turkish occupation, the village was continually the site of food and weapons shipments. Once the village came under Hungarian control again, it came under the domain of the Szentmáriay family. As a defenceless village of serfs, it was not a particularly attractive place to live, so by the end of the 15th century the village was abandoned and became pastureland. The village was only resettled by the late 18th century.

== Demographics ==
As of 2023, the village had a total population of 1126. As of 2022, the town was 95.6% Hungarian, 0.7% Gypsy, 0.4% German, and 2.5% of non-European origin. The remainder chose not to respond. The population was 52.2% Roman Catholic, and 4.0% Reformed.
