= Karácsond =

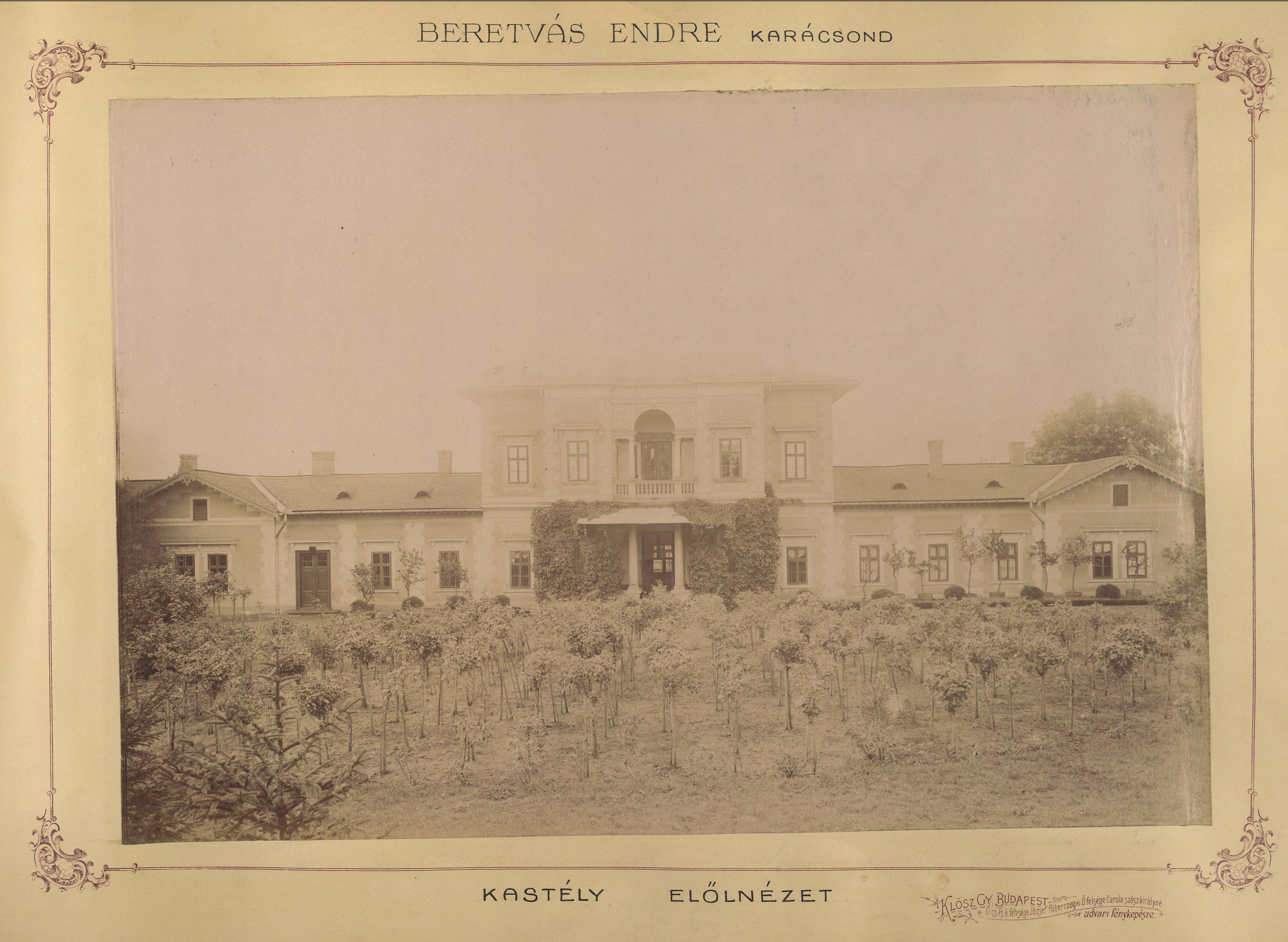
- Front view of the Beretvás castle

- Flag Coat of arms

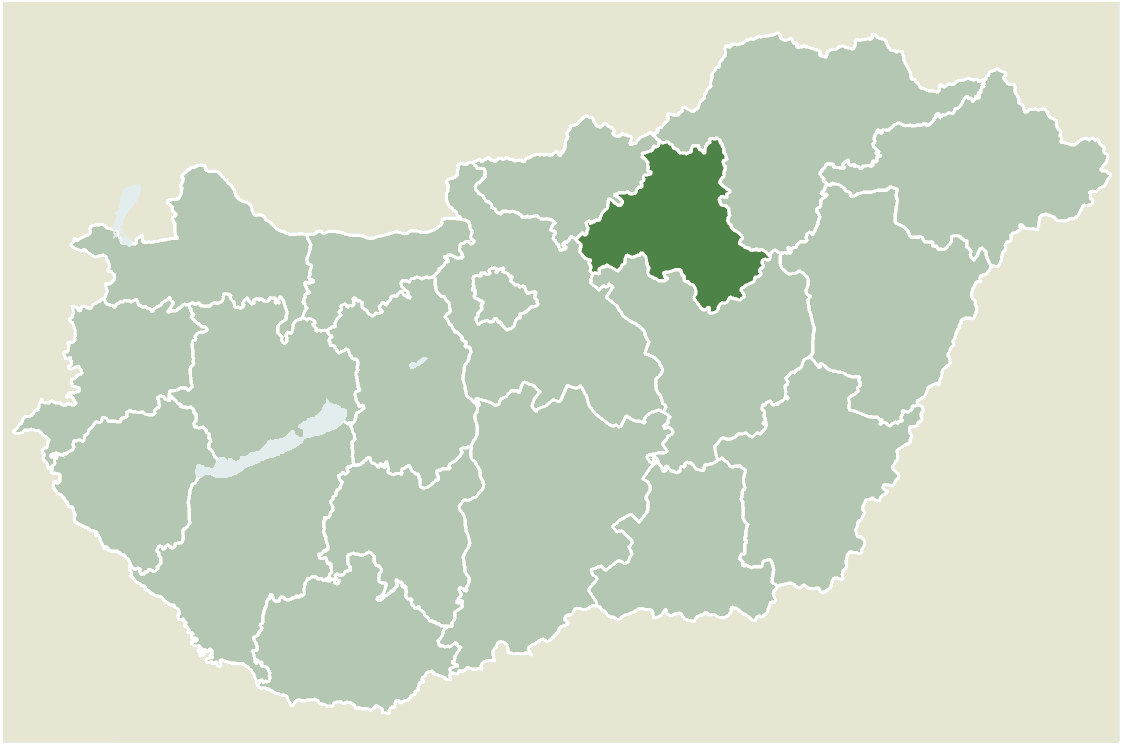
- Location of Heves County in Hungary

- Location of Karácsond in Hungary
- Coordinates: 47.733°N 20.033°E
- Country: Hungary
- County: Heves

Government
  - Mayor: Csaba Földi (Ind.)

Area
  - Total: 316 km^{2} (122 sq mi)

Population (2010)
  - Total: 2,911
  - Density: 91.87/km^{2} (237.9/sq mi)
- Time zone: UTC+1 (CET)
  - Summer (DST): UTC+2 (UTC)
- Postal code: 3281
- Area code: 37

Karácsond is a village in Heves Country, Hungary.

== History ==
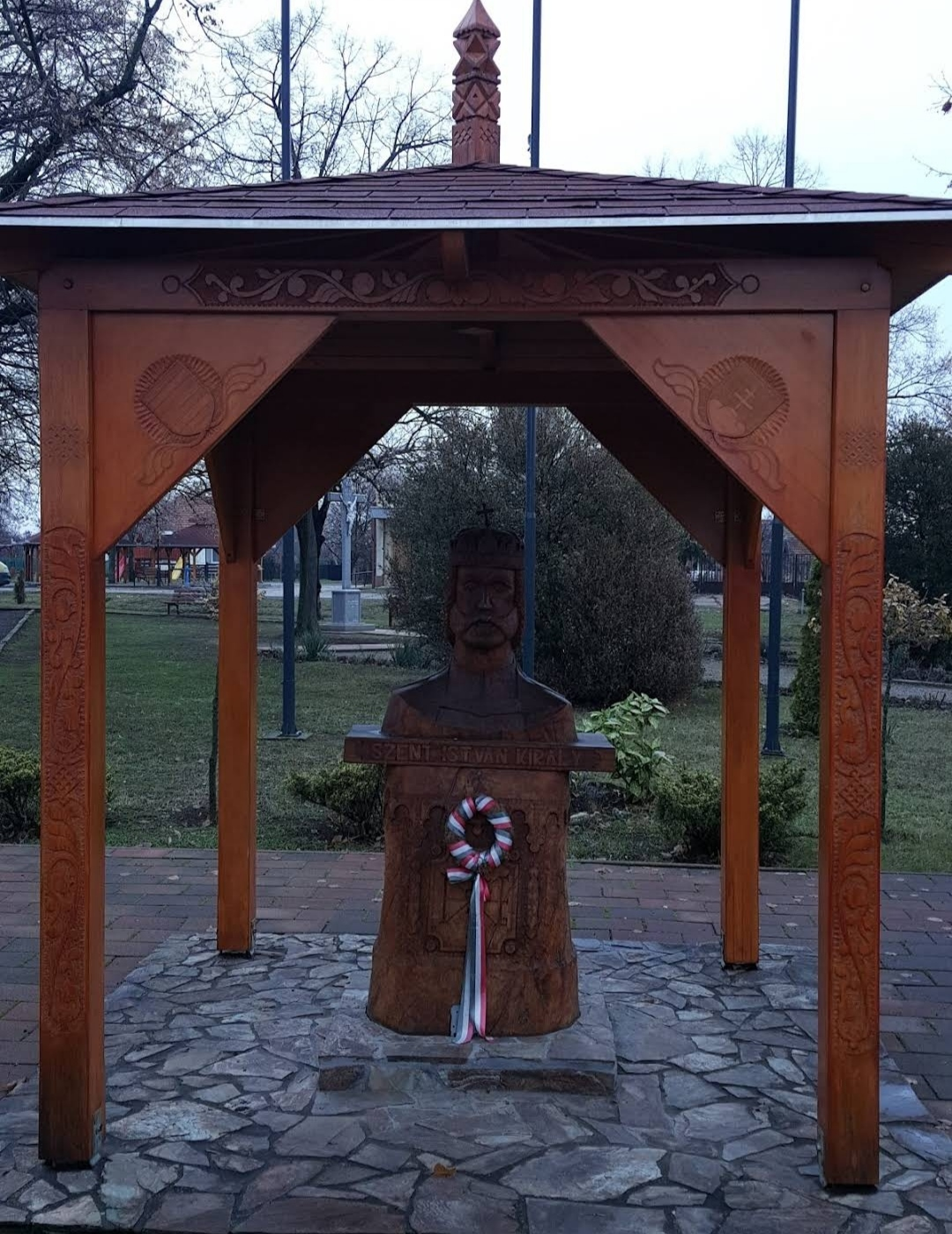
Bust of King Saint Stephen I in Karácsond

The territory is inhabited since ancient times, but the first mentioning of the village is in 1323 as Karachund. It was the estate of the Aba genus then inherited by the Csobánka genus. In 1325 it was given to the Kompolti family, succeeded by the Ország family in 1522. As a result of the Ottoman-Hungarian wars, six serf lands were destroyed and three impoverished. In the 18th century the Haller, Esterházy and Drašković families owned the village, followed by the Orczy, Gönczi and Puky. Under this time the territory became Slavic majority. During the Hungarian Revolution of 1848 nine serfs from Karácsond joined the army of Lajos Kossuth.

== Population ==
In 2011 89,9% of the village's population identified as Hungarian, 6,7% as Romani, 0,1% as Slovak, also 0,1% as Bulgarian and 0,5% as other. 54,1% identified as Roman Catholic, 16,6% as non-religious, 4,1% as Reformational, 0,2% as Greek Catholic, also 0,2% as Lutheran and 1,9% as other.
