= Kisköre =

- Town
- Flag Coat of arms

- Location of Kisköre
- Coordinates: 47.499°N 20.492°E
- Country: Hungary
- County: Heves
- District: Heves (district)

Area
  - Total: 68.42 km^{2} (26.42 sq mi)

Population (2015)
  - Total: 2,911
  - Density: 42.55/km^{2} (110.2/sq mi)
- Time zone: UTC+1 (CET)
  - Summer (DST): UTC+2 (CEST)
- Postal code: 3384
- Area code: (+36) 36
- Website: kiskore.hu

Kisköre is a town in Heves County, Hungary.

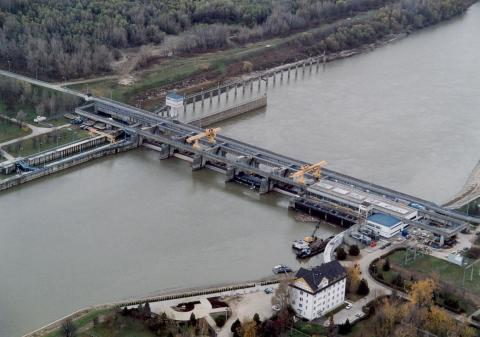
Tisza Dam

== The sluice ==
There is a hydroelectric sluice in Kisköre that was built in 1973 when Tisza Dam was completed.
