= Zsolt Szabó (Hungarian politician) =

Hungarian agronomist and politician

Member of the National Assembly
- Incumbent
- Assumed office 14 May 2010

Personal details
- Born: 20 October 1963 (age 62) Eger, Hungary
- Party: Fidesz
- Profession: agronomist, politician

Zsolt Szabó (born 20 October 1963) is a Hungarian agronomist and politician, member of the National Assembly (MP) for Hatvan (Heves County Constituency IV then III) since 2010. He was also mayor of the town from 2010 to 2014. Szabó was appointed Secretary of State for Development, Climate Policy and Priority Public Services in the Ministry of National Development on 15 June 2014, holding the office until 17 May 2018.

He was elected Vice Chairman of the Committee on Consumer Protection on 14 May 2010, holding the position until 5 May 2014. He was a member then vice-chairman of the Legislative Committee for a short time in May–June 2014, until his appointment as state secretary. He is a member of the Committee on Budgets since 4 June 2018.

On 23 March 2018, daily Magyar Nemzet reported that Szabó and his wife own an offshore company in Belize. Its bank account contained $4,8 million.
