= Heves County =

County in northern Hungary

Coordinates: 47°50′N 20°15′E

Heves County Heves megye
- Counties of Hungary
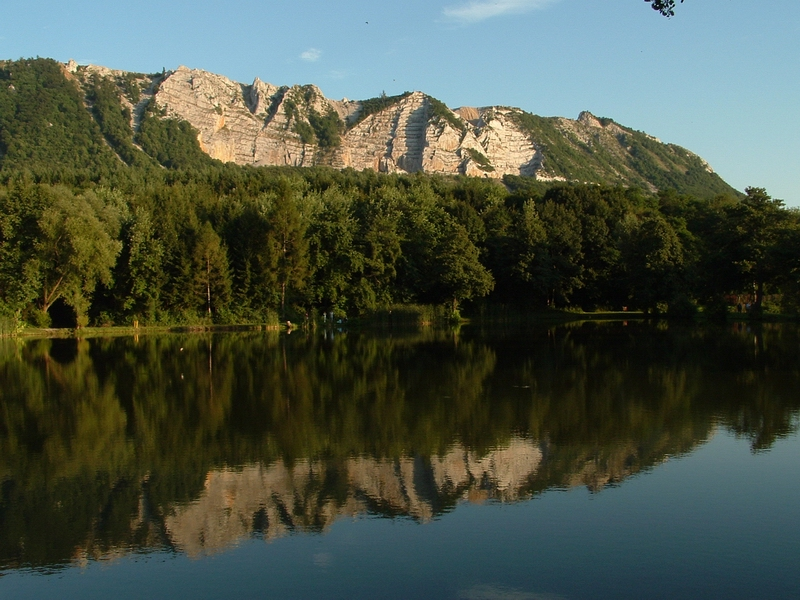
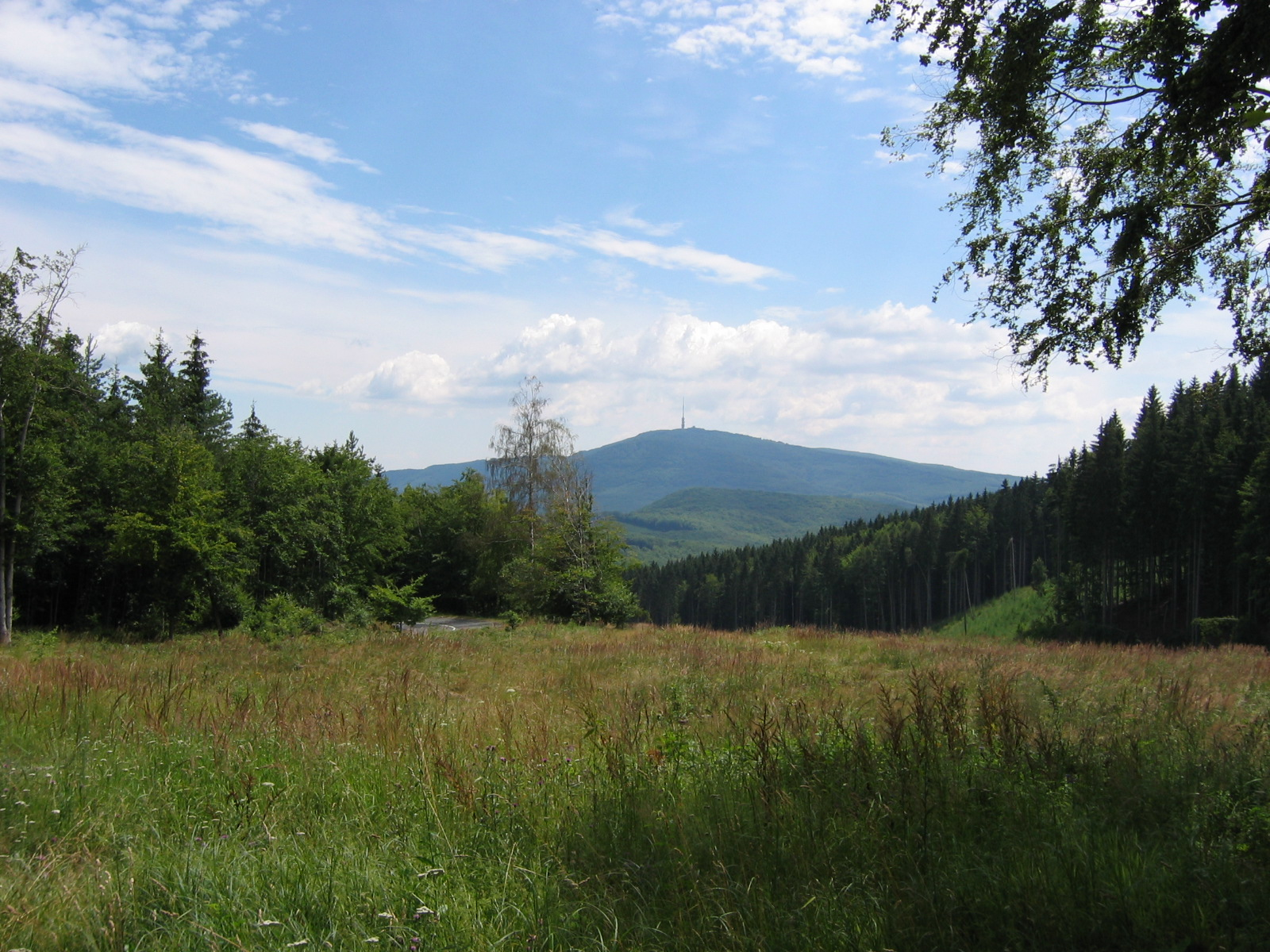
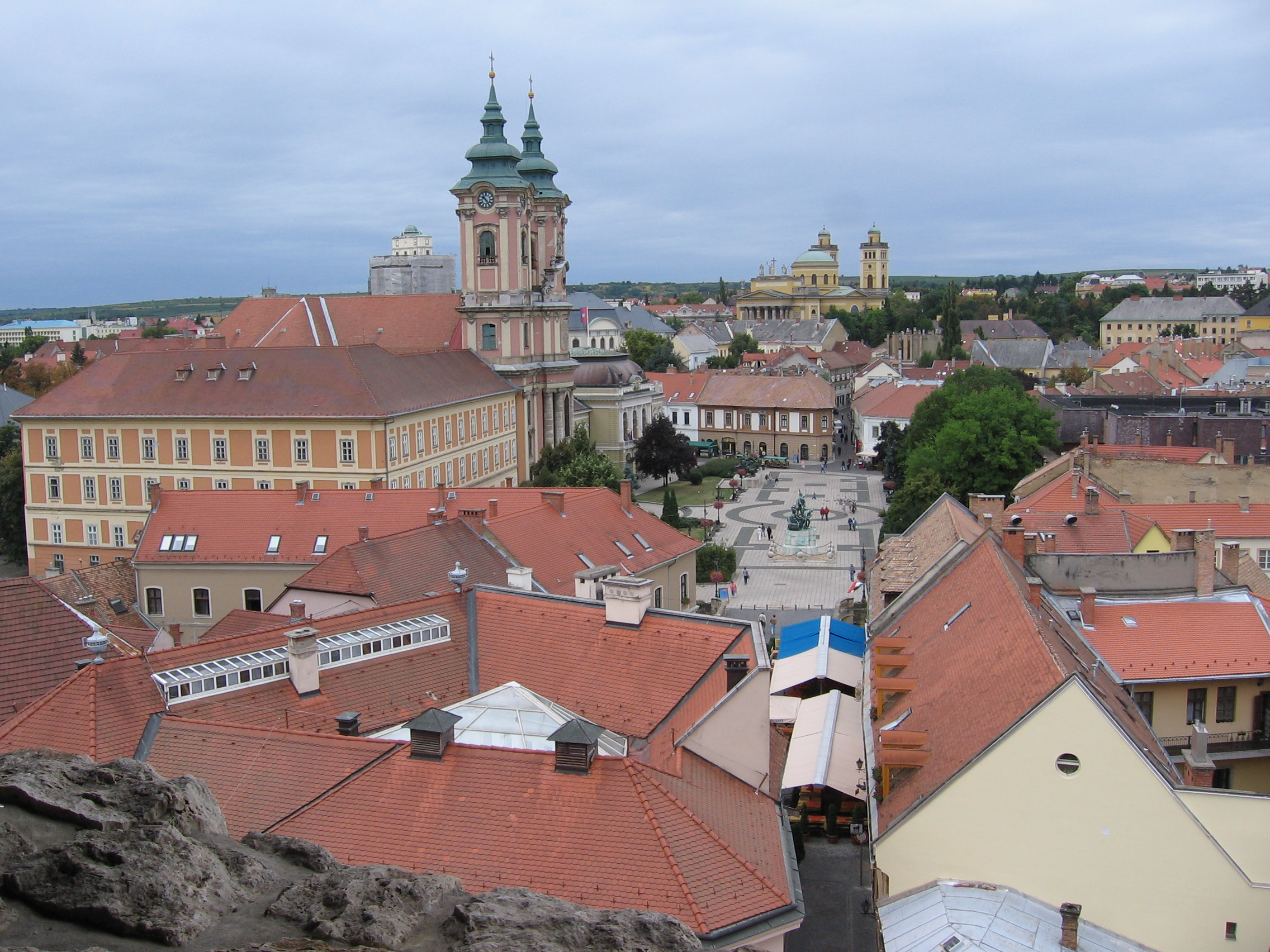
- Descending, from top: Bél Stone near Bélapátfalva, View of Kékes, and View from Castle of Eger

- Flag Coat of arms

- Heves County within Hungary
- Country: Hungary
- Region: Northern Hungary
- County seat: Eger
- Districts: 7 districts: Bélapátfalva District; Eger District; Füzesabony District; Gyöngyös District; Hatvan District; Heves District; Pétervására District

Government
  - President of the General Assembly: Róbert Szabó (Fidesz-KDNP)

Area
  - Total: 3,637.21 km^{2} (1,404.33 sq mi)
  - Rank: 16th in Hungary

Population (2022)
  - Total: 285,892
  - Rank: 14th in Hungary
  - Density: 78.6020/km^{2} (203.578/sq mi)

GDP
  - Total: HUF 776 billion €2.492 billion (2016)
- Postal code: 300x – 304x, 32xx – 33xx
- Area code(s): (+36) 36, 37
- ISO 3166 code: HU-HE
- Website: hevesmegye.hu

Heves county (Hungarian: Heves megye, pronounced [ˈhɛvɛʃ]) lies in northern Hungary, between the right bank of the river Tisza and the Mátra and Bükk mountains. It shares borders with the Hungarian counties Pest, Nógrád, Borsod-Abaúj-Zemplén and Jász-Nagykun-Szolnok. Eger is the county seat.

== Tourist sights ==
- Lake Tisza
- Bükk National Park
- Bélapátfalva, abbey
- Castle and City of Eger
- Erdőtelek Arboretum
- Feldebrő, 11th century Romanesque church
- Gyöngyös, Mátra Museum
- Hatvan, Grassalkovich mansion
- Kisnána castle
- Noszvaj, De la Motte mansion
- Parád
- Sirok castle
- Szilvásvárad, Szalajka Valley
- Szarvaskő, castle ruins

== Geography ==
Heves county is a geographically diverse area; its northern part is mountainous (the Mátra and Bükk are the two highest mountain ranges in Hungary), while at south it includes a part of the Great Hungarian Plain. From south it is bordered by Lake Tisza, the largest artificial lake in Hungary. The average temperature is between 8 and 10 °C (higher on the southern parts of the county).

=== Rivers ===
- Zagyva
- Tarna
- Tisza
- Laskó

=== Highest point ===
- Kékestető, Mátra Mountains (1014 m; highest in Hungary)

=== Lowest point ===
- Kisköre (86 m.)

== History ==
The county was a primary target for the Ottoman Empire during the Ottoman-Hungarian Wars where the Siege of Eger took place.

== Demographics ==
The population of Heves County was 285,892 as of the 2022 Census, with a population density of 79 individuals per square kilometer (79/km^{2}). The number of households was 118,802 and the number of families was 77,333. Since the 2011 Census, the population decreased by 22,990 (-7.4%).

Historical population
Year	Pop.	±%
1870	205,146	—
1880	203,338	−0.9%
1890	227,156	+11.7%
1900	249,354	+9.8%
1910	275,181	+10.4%
1920	292,290	+6.2%
1930	312,085	+6.8%
1941	319,043	+2.2%
1949	316,273	−0.9%
1960	347,856	+10.0%
1970	340,146	−2.2%
1980	350,360	+3.0%
1990	334,408	−4.6%
2001	325,727	−2.6%
2011	308,882	−5.2%
2022	285,892	−7.4%

=== Ethnicity ===
In the 2022 Census, the vast majority (85.9%) of the population identified as Hungarian. A minority of 5.9% identified as belonging to another ethnic group and 11.4% of the population did not respond. The ethnic groups most identified with were Romani (4.8%), German (0.2%), and Ukrainian (0.2%). Small numbers identified as Slovak (344), Romanian (324), Ruthenian (112), or other domestic ethnic groups (365) or other groups (757). (Note: Individuals were able to identify with multiple ethnic groups, so the percentages may not add up to 100%.)

In the 2011 Census, 83.4% of the population identified as Hungarian. Less than a tenth (7.1%) of the population identified as belonging to another ethnic group and 13.9% did not respond. Romani made up 6.3% of the population, German (0.2%), Slovak (0.2%) and Romanian (0.1%). Small numbers identified as other domestic ethnic groups (534) or other groups (563).

=== Religion ===
Religion in Heves County (2022 census – of those who declared their religion (60.7%))
1. Roman Catholic (63.4%)
2. Calvinistic (7.20%)
3. Greek Catholic (0.80%)
4. Lutheran (0.50%)
5. Other Christian denomination (4.40%)
6. Other religion (0.40%)
7. Not religious (23.3%)

In the 2022 Census, just over half of the population (51.4%) were religious adherents. The largest religious community was Roman Catholic (38.5%). Other communities included Calvinist (4.4%), Greek Catholic (0.5%), Lutheran (0.3%), Orthodox Christian (0.1%), Other Christian denomination (1.7%), and other religious affiliations (0.2%). Small numbers (less than 100) were affiliated with Judaism. The non-religious made up 14.1% of the population. More than a third (39.0%) of the population did not respond.

In the 2011 Census, 59.2% of the population were religious adherents. The largest religious community was Roman Catholic (52.1%). Others included Calvinist (4.8%), Greek Catholic (0.4%), Lutheran (0.4%), Other Christian denomination (1.3%), and other religious affiliations (0.2%). Small numbers were affiliated with Judaism and Orthodox Christianity. Atheists made up (1.0%) of the population and other non-religious made up 14.0%. Just over a quarter (25.8%) of the population did not respond.

In 1930, the population was 91.6% Roman Catholic, 5.2% Calvinist, 2.4% Jewish, 0.5% Lutheran, and others (0.3%).

== Regional structure ==
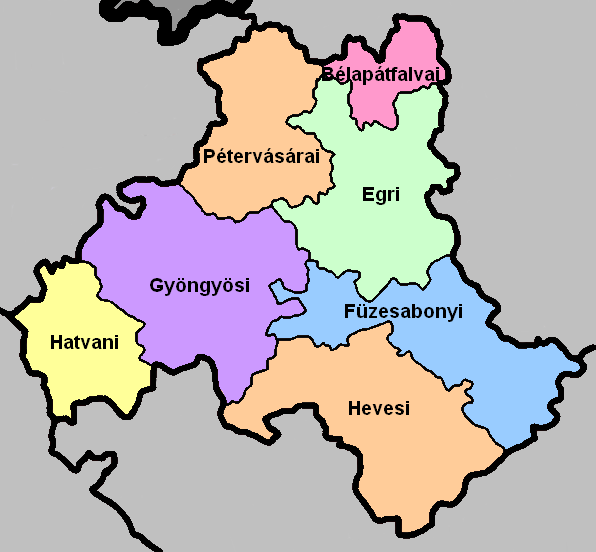
District of Heves County

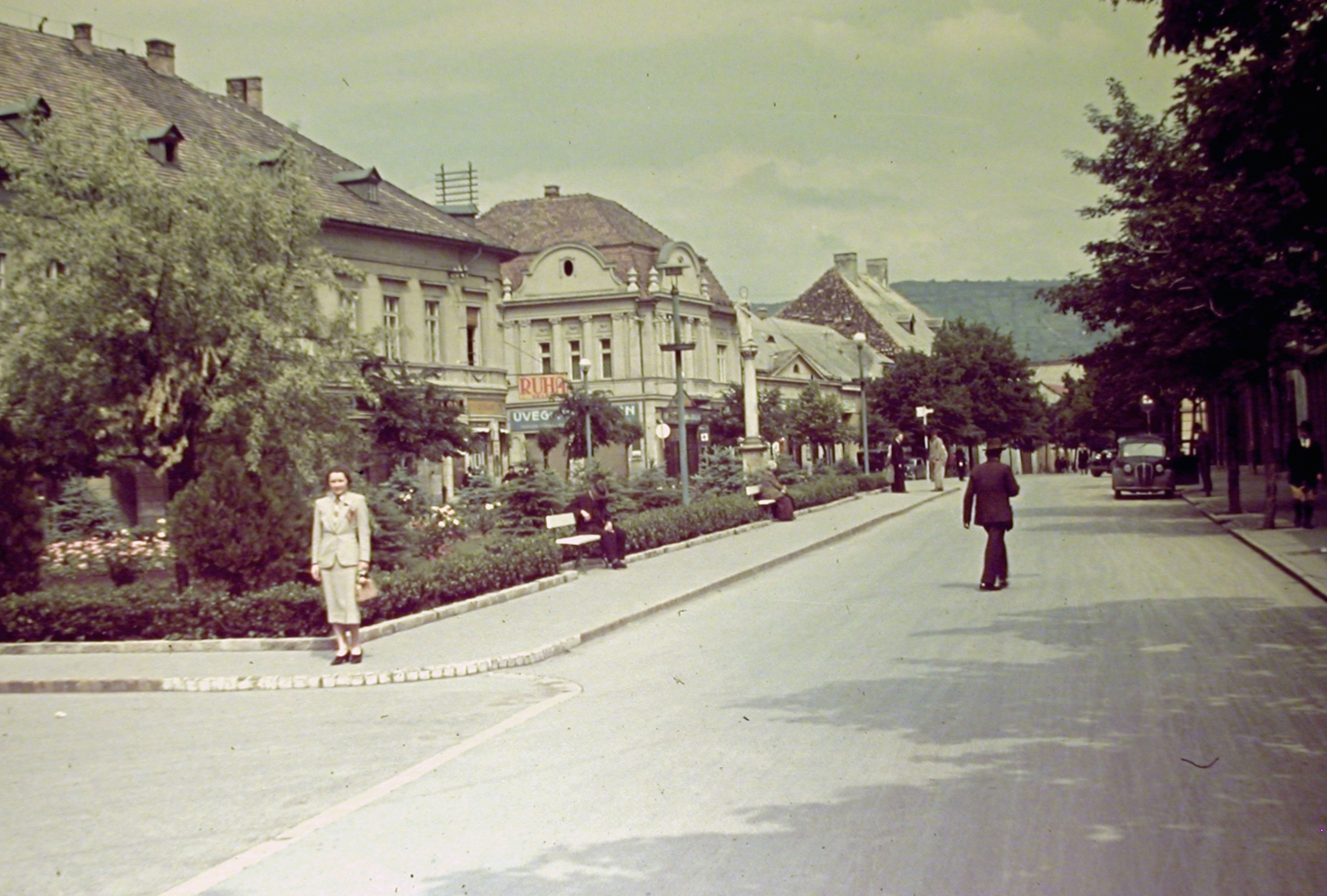
Gyöngyös 1938

No.	English and Hungarian names	Area (km^{2})	Population (2022)	Density (pop./km^{2})	Seat	No. of municipalities
1	Bélapátfalva District; Bélapátfalvai járás	180.89	7,817	43	Bélapátfalva	8
2	Eger District; Egri járás	602.05	80,419	134	Eger	22
3	Füzesabony District; Füzesabonyi járás	578.55	28,345	49	Füzesabony	16
4	Gyöngyös District; Gyöngyösi járás	750.78	66,931	89	Gyöngyös	25
5	Hatvan District; Hatvani járás	352.16	50,266	143	Hatvan	13
6	Heves District; Hevesi járás	697.68	33,189	48	Heves (town)	17
7	Pétervására District; Pétervásárai járás	475.07	18,925	40	Pétervására	20
Heves County		3,637.25	285,892	79	Eger	121

== Politics ==
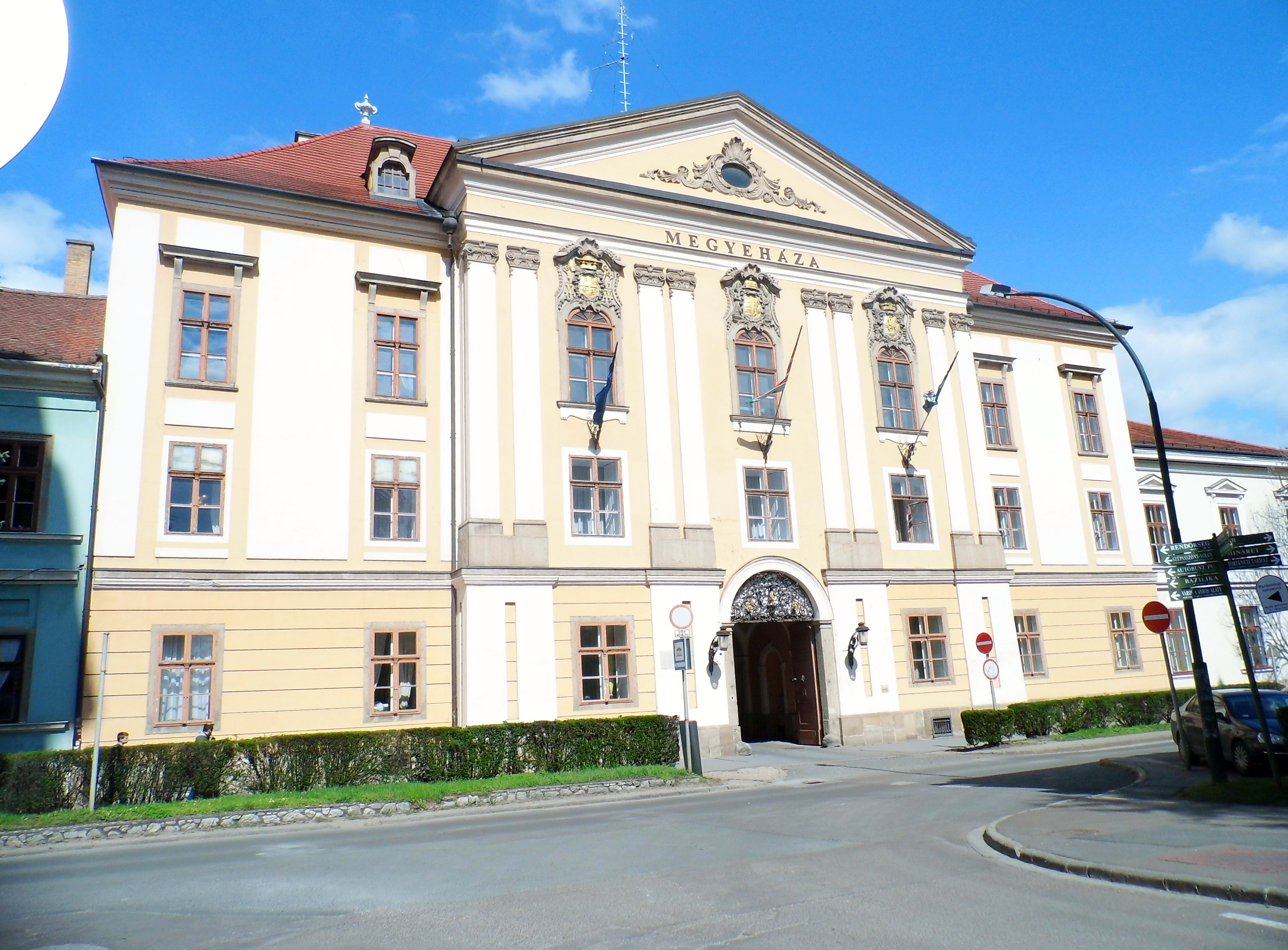
Countyhall of Heves

=== County Assembly ===
The Heves County Council, elected at the 2024 local government elections, is made up of 15 counselors, with the following party composition:

Party	Seats	Current County Assembly
Fidesz-KDNP	9	
Our Homeland Movement	2	
Democratic Coalition	2	
Momentum Movement	1	
Jobbik	1	

=== Presidents of the General Assembly ===
List of presidents since 1990
Róbert Szabó (Fidesz-KDNP)	2014–

==== Members of the National Assembly ====
The following members elected of the National Assembly during the 2022 parliamentary election:

Constituency	Member	Party
Heves County 1st constituency	Gábor Pajtók	Fidesz–KDNP
Heves County 2nd constituency	László Horváth	Fidesz–KDNP
Heves County 3rd constituency	Zsolt Szabó	Fidesz–KDNP

== Municipalities ==
Heves County has 1 urban county, 10 towns, 3 large villages and 107 villages.

City with county rights

(ordered by population, as of 2011 census)

- Eger (56,569) – county seat

Towns

- Gyöngyös (31,421)
- Hatvan (20,519)
- Heves (10,753)
- Füzesabony (7,880)
- Lőrinci (5,831)
- Verpelét (3,786)
- Bélapátfalva (3,092)
- Kisköre (2,869)
- Gyöngyöspata (2,586)
- Pétervására (2,326)

Large villages

- Kál
- Parád
- Recsk

Villages

- Abasár
- Adács
- Aldebrő
- Andornaktálya
- Apc
- Atkár
- Átány
- Balaton
- Bátor
- Bekölce
- Besenyőtelek
- Boconád
- Bodony
- Boldog
- Bükkszék
- Bükkszenterzsébet
- Bükkszentmárton
- Csány
- Demjén
- Detk
- Domoszló
- Dormánd
- Ecséd
- Egerbakta
- Egerbocs
- Egercsehi
- Egerfarmos
- Egerszalók
- Egerszólát
- Erdőkövesd
- Erdőtelek
- Erk
- Fedémes
- Feldebrő
- Felsőtárkány
- Gyöngyöshalász
- Gyöngyösoroszi
- Gyöngyössolymos
- Gyöngyöstarján
- Halmajugra
- Heréd
- Hevesaranyos
- Hevesvezekény
- Hort
- Istenmezeje
- Ivád
- Karácsond
- Kápolna
- Kerecsend
- Kisfüzes
- Kisnána
- Kompolt
- Kömlő
- Ludas
- Maklár
- Markaz
- Mátraballa
- Mátraderecske
- Mátraszentimre
- Mezőszemere
- Mezőtárkány
- Mikófalva
- Mónosbél
- Nagyfüged
- Nagykökényes
- Nagyréde
- Nagytálya
- Nagyút
- Nagyvisnyó
- Noszvaj
- Novaj
- Ostoros
- Parádsasvár
- Pálosvörösmart
- Petőfibánya
- Pély
- Poroszló
- Rózsaszentmárton
- Sarud
- Sirok
- Szajla
- Szarvaskő
- Szentdomonkos
- Szihalom
- Szilvásvárad
- Szúcs
- Szűcsi
- Tarnabod
- Tarnalelesz
- Tarnaméra
- Tarnaörs
- Tarnaszentmária
- Tarnaszentmiklós
- Tarnazsadány
- Tenk
- Terpes
- Tiszanána
- Tófalu
- Újlőrincfalva
- Vámosgyörk
- Váraszó
- Vécs
- Visonta
- Visznek
- Zagyvaszántó
- Zaránk

== Gallery ==
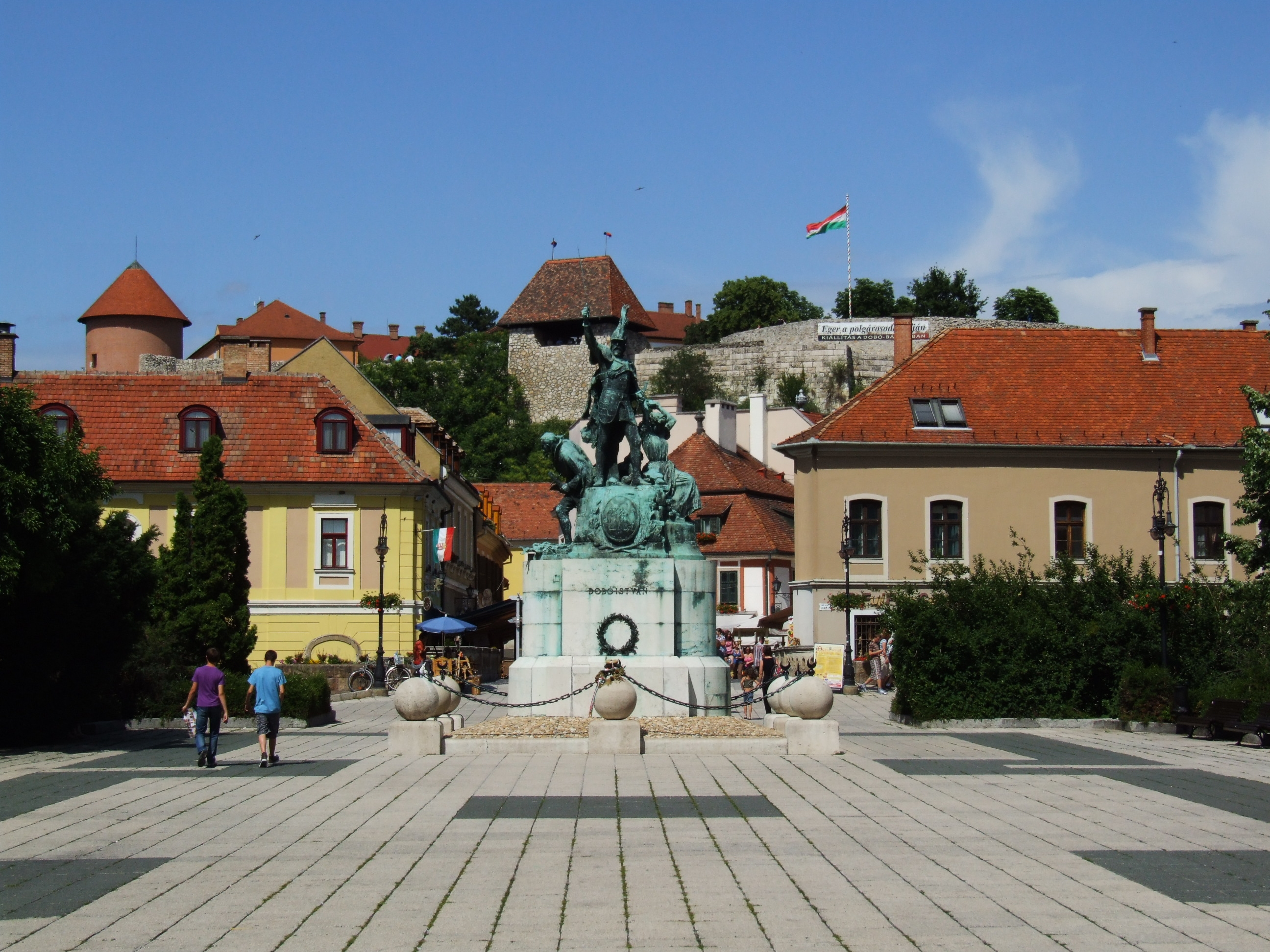
Eger, the capital of the county

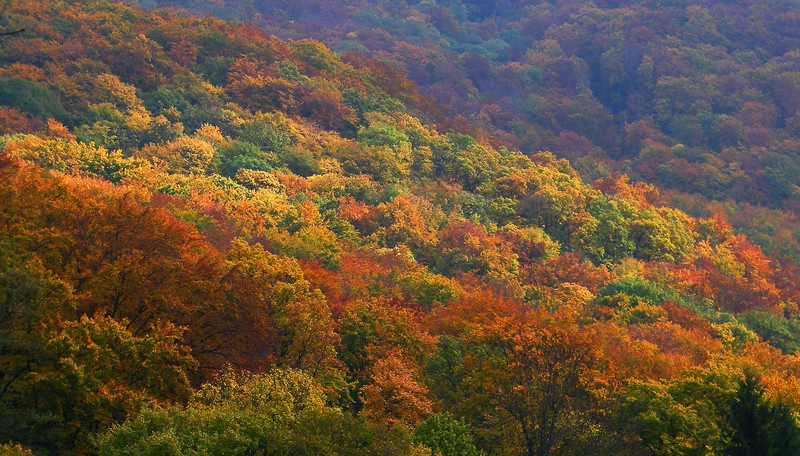
Autumn in the Bükk Mountains

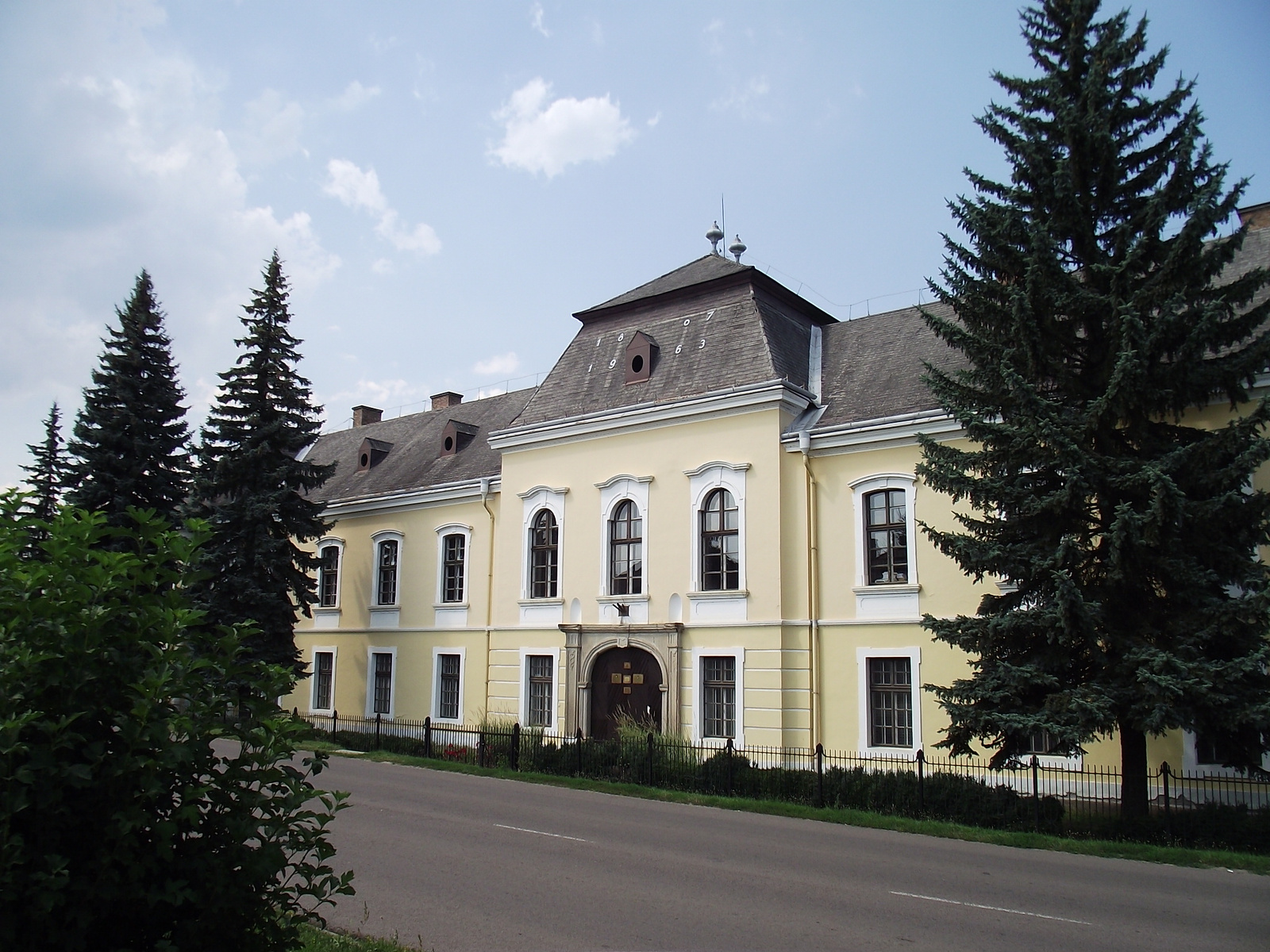
Keglevich Mansion in Pétervására

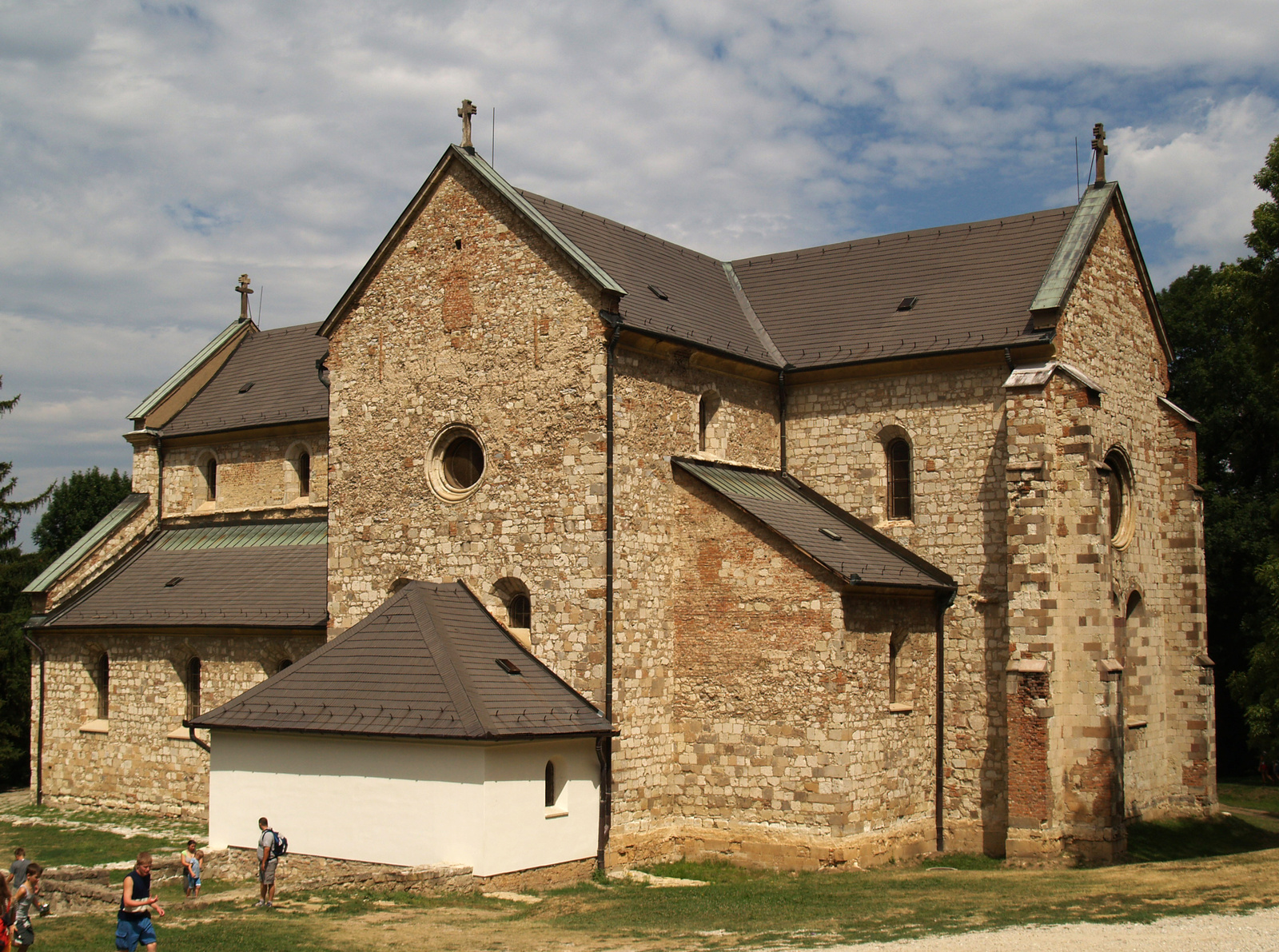
Romanesque church in Bélapátfalva

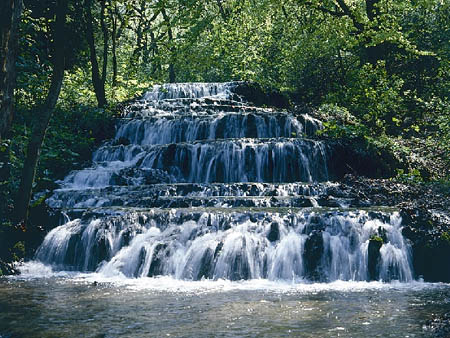
Waterfall in the Szalajka Valley near Szilvásvárad

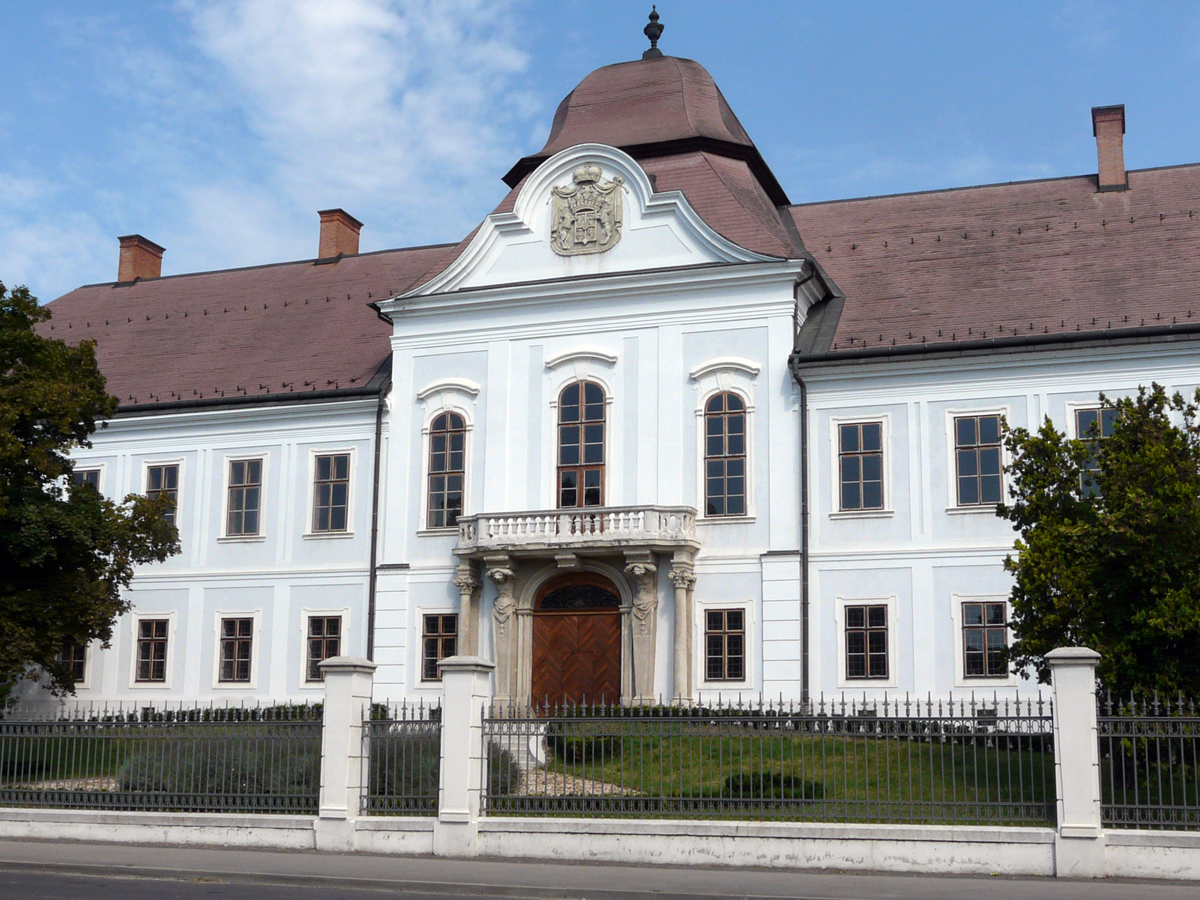
Grassalkovich Mansion in Hatvan

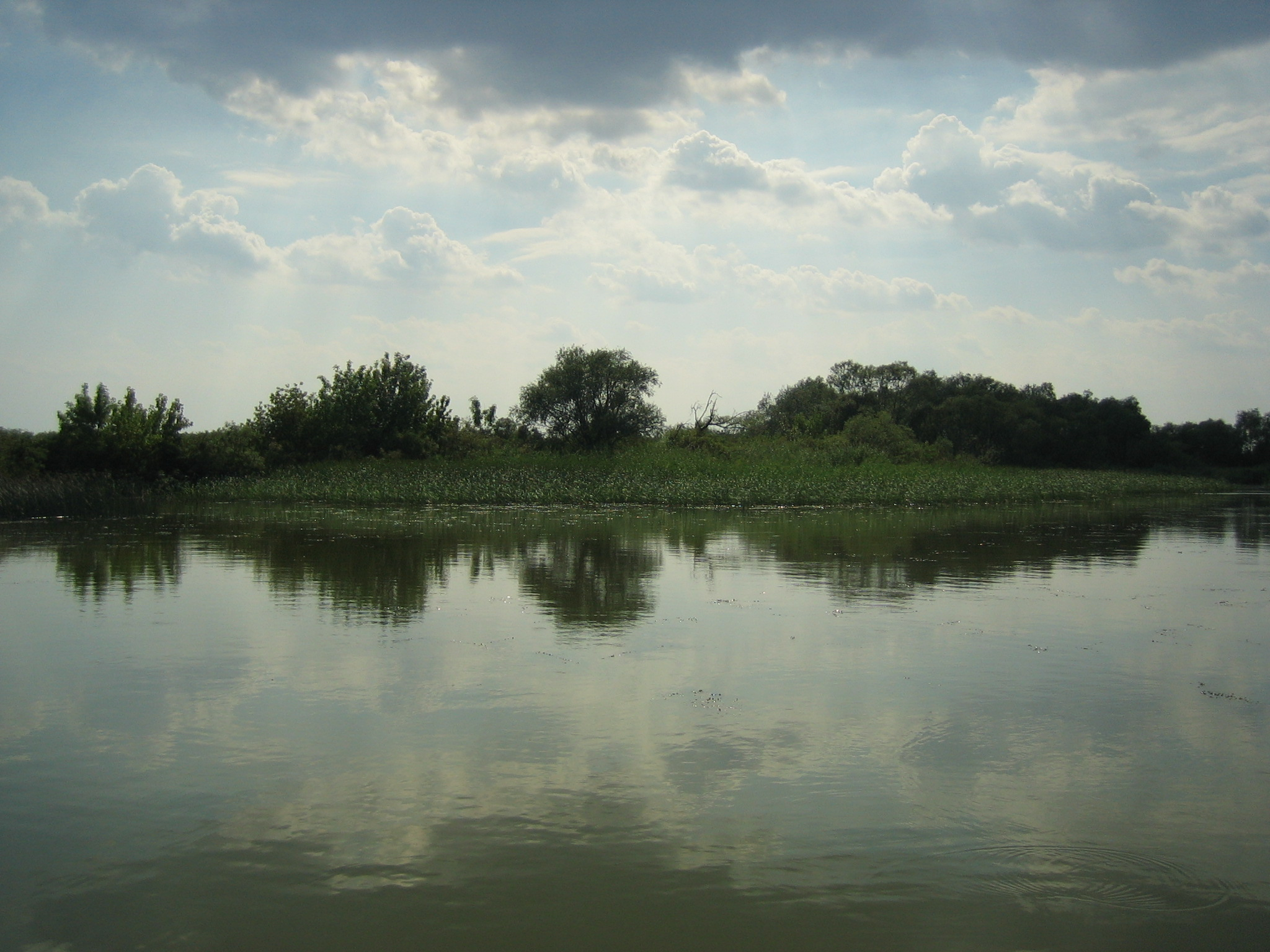
Lake Tisza is the 3rd largest lake of Hungary

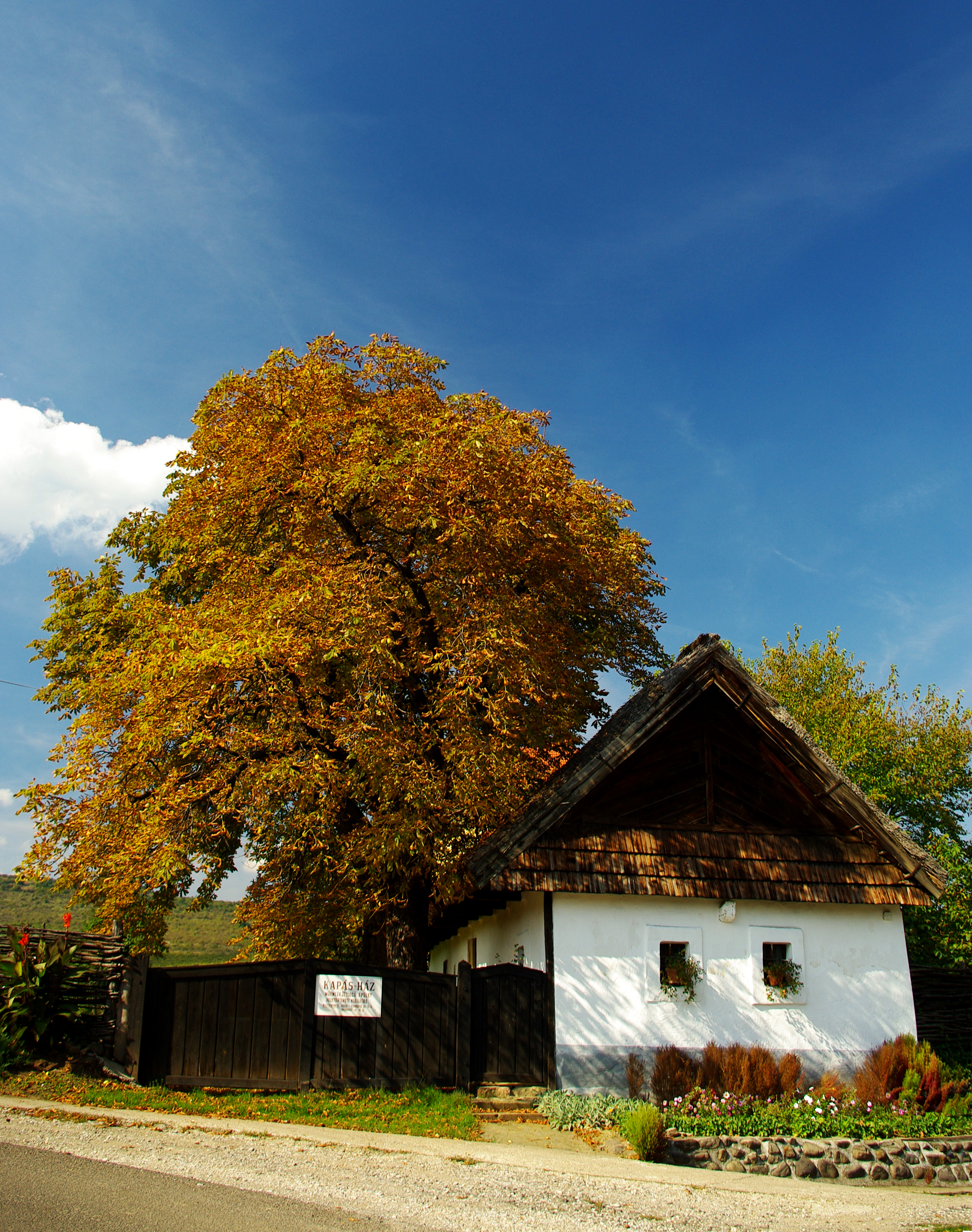
Traditional residential house in Abasár

== International relations ==
Heves County has a partnership relationship with:

- Banská Bystrica Region, Slovakia
- Covasna County, Romania
- Harghita County, Romania
- Loire-Atlantique, Pays de la Loire, France
- Przemyśl County, Lesser Poland, Poland
- Värmland County, Sweden
