= List of populated places in Hungary =

This is a list of cities, towns and villages of Hungary

KEY: T Nagi Beckchervick = Town; V = Village

== Notes ==
- Cities marked with * have several different post codes, the one here is only the most general one.
