= Heves =

Town in Heves county, Hungary

- Town
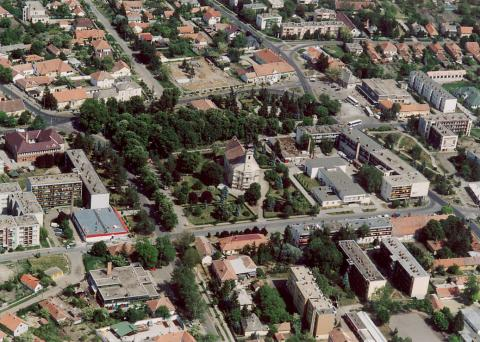

- Flag Coat of arms

- Location within Hungary
- Coordinates: 47°35′40″N 20°17′17″E
- Country: Hungary
- County: Heves
- District: Heves

Area
  - Total: 99.31 km^{2} (38.34 sq mi)

Population (2013)
  - Total: 10,864
  - Density: 109.4/km^{2} (283.3/sq mi)
- Time zone: UTC+1 (CET)
  - Summer (DST): UTC+2 (CEST)
- Postal code: 3360
- Area code: (+36) 36
- Website: www.heves.hu

Heves is a small town in eastern Hungary. About 100 km east of Budapest, Heves lies at the northern extreme of the Great Hungarian Plain, just south of the Mátra and Bükk hills and west of the Tisza River. Heves gave its name to Heves County, however it is not its seat and it is the fourth largest town in the county. The closest major city is Eger, which lies 40 km to the north. Heves is a significant transportation hub for the towns and agricultural areas of southern Heves County.

== Demographics ==
Heves is home to approximately 11,000 residents. In addition to the ethnic Hungarian majority, there is a sizable Roma population.

== Economy ==
The major sources of employment in Heves are agricultural and service-sector occupations.

== Transport ==
Heves is served by a modern bus station near the centre of the town. The town is also served by a small train station 1 km from the town centre. Heves is located on a small train line (kis piros) that connects with major lines at Kál-Kápolna to the north and Kisújszállás to the south.

== Education ==
Heves has a music school, a children's house and a high school (Eotvos Jozsef Kozepiskola). The high school is home to more than 1,000 students and is widely known for its police academy. Every year, the high school welcomes an English teacher from an English-speaking country to join the faculty for the school year.

== Culture ==
The town welcomes an outdoor market every Wednesday and Saturday morning. Heves is well known for watermelons and hosts a watermelon festival each August.

== Sights ==
The centre of the town is a scenic park with a chestnut-lined promenade, a gazebo, a fountain and numerous statues. A town museum and a 19th-century Catholic church stand at opposite ends of the park. A second museum (sakkmuzeum), one of the few chess museums in the world, is located not far from the park. Other recreational opportunities in Heves include a thermal bath, a community center that doubles as a theatre (kulturhaz) and the Aranykehely restaurant.

Other major civic institutions in Heves include a town hall, a town library and a folkart and handicraft cooperative.

== Twin towns – sister cities ==
Heves is twinned with:

- Breganze, Italy
- Ciumani, Romania
- Miercurea Ciuc, Romania
- Sulejów, Poland
- Tornaľa, Slovakia

== Notable people ==
- Lajos Hevesi (1843–1910), journalist and author
- Antal Stevanecz (1861–1921), Slovene teacher and writer
