= Administrative divisions of Hungary =

There are currently several types of administrative divisions of Hungary; these include:

- Regions of Hungary

There are seven statistical regions of Hungary created in 1999 by the Law 1999/XCII amending Law 1996/XXI. Regions are groupings of the 19 counties and the capital city.

- Counties of Hungary

Hungary is subdivided administratively into 19 counties (megyék, singular: megye), cities with county rights: Baja, Bekescsaba, Debrecen, Dunaujvaros, Eger, Erd, Esztergom, Gyor, Hodmezovasarhely, Kaposvar, Kecskemet, Miskolc, Nagykanizsa, Nyiregyhaza, Pecs, Salgotarjan, Sopron, Szeged, Szekesfehervar, Szekszard, Szolnok, Szombathely, Tatabanya, Veszprem, Zalaegerszeg and the capital city (főváros) Budapest. The capital Budapest is subdivided into 23 districts (kerületek, singular: kerület).

- Districts of Hungary

The districts of Hungary are the second-level divisions within Hungary after counties. The counties are subdivided into 174 districts (járások, singular: járás). these replaced the 175 subregions of Hungary in 2013.

Former administrative divisions of Hungary include:

- Administrative divisions of the Kingdom of Hungary
- Counties of Hungary (1000–1920)
- Administrative divisions of the Kingdom of Hungary (1941–1945)
- Subregions of Hungary

== See also ==
- List of cities and towns of Hungary
- Government of Hungary
