= Heves County 2nd constituency =

Hungarian national legislative constituency

Heves County 2nd constituency (Gyöngyös)
- Constituency for the National Assembly
- Location of Heves county 02 within Heves county

- Location of Heves county within Hungary
- County: Heves
- Electorate: 80,288 (2018)
- Major settlements: Gyöngyös

Current constituency
- Created: 2011
- Party: Tisza Party
- Member: János Kiss
- Created from: Constituency no. 2; Constituency no. 3
- Elected: 2026

The 2nd constituency of Heves County (Hungarian: Heves megyei 02. számú országgyűlési egyéni választókerület) is one of the single member constituencies of the National Assembly, the national legislature of Hungary. The constituency standard abbreviation: Heves 02. OEVK.

Since 2026, it has been represented by János Kiss of the Tisza Party.

== Geography ==
The 2nd constituency is located in north-western part of Heves County.

The constituency borders the 3rd, 4th and 2nd constituencies of Borsod-Abaúj-Zemplén County to the northeast, Heves County 1st constituency to the southeast, Heves County 3rd constituency to the south and 1st constituency of Nógrád County to the northwest.

=== List of municipalities ===
The constituency includes the following municipalities:

1. Abasár
2. Aldebrő
3. Balaton
4. Bátor
5. Bekölce
6. Bélapátfalva
7. Bodony
8. Bükkszék
9. Bükkszenterzsébet
10. Bükkszentmárton
11. Detk
12. Domoszló
13. Egerbocs
14. Egercsehi
15. Erdőkövesd
16. Fedémes
17. Feldebrő
18. Gyöngyös
19. Gyöngyösoroszi
20. Gyöngyöspata
21. Gyöngyössolymos
22. Gyöngyöstarján
23. Halmajugra
24. Hevesaranyos
25. Istenmezeje
26. Ivád
27. Kál
28. Kápolna
29. Kisfüzes
30. Kisnána
31. Kompolt
32. Markaz
33. Mátraballa
34. Mátraderecske
35. Mátraszentimre
36. Mikófalva
37. Mónosbél
38. Nagyvisnyó
39. Pálosvörösmart
40. Parád
41. Parádsasvár
42. Pétervására
43. Recsk
44. Sirok
45. Szajla
46. Szentdomonkos
47. Szilvásvárad
48. Szúcs
49. Tarnalelesz
50. Tarnaszentmária
51. Terpes
52. Tófalu
53. Váraszó
54. Vécs
55. Verpelét
56. Visonta

== History ==
The current 2nd constituency of Heves County was created in 2011 and contains the pre-2011 2nd constituency and the main part of the pre-2011 3rd constituency of Heves County. Its borders have not changed since its creation.

== Members ==
The constituency was first represented by László Horváth of the Fidesz from 2014, and he was re-elected in 2018 and 2022. In the 2026 election, János Kiss of the Tisza Party was elected representative.

Election	Member	Party	%	Ref.
2014	László Horváth	Fidesz	36.97	
2018	László Horváth	Fidesz	46.15	
2022	László Horváth	Fidesz	54.91	
2026	János Kiss	TISZA	51.65	

== Election result ==
=== 2022 election ===
Result 2022
1. László Horváth, Fidesz–KDNP (54.9%)
2. Róbert Dudás, United for Hungary (36.4%)
3. Roland Hajdara, Our Homeland (6.00%)
4. Zsolt Érsek, Independent (1.70%)
5. Nándor Oszvald, MEMO (1.00%)

2022 parliamentary election: Heves County - 2nd constituency
Party	Candidate	Votes	%	±%
Fidesz–KDNP	László Horváth	28,878	54.91	+8.76
United for Hungary	Róbert Dudás	19,148	36.41	
Mi Hazánk	Roland Hajdara	3,141	5.97	New
Independent	Zsolt Érsek	915	1.74	
MEMO	Richárd Barna	505	0.96	New
Majority		9,730	18.5	
Turnout		53,270	69.32	▼2.17
Registered electors		76,849		
Fidesz–KDNP hold		Swing	+14.3	

=== 2018 election ===
Result 2018
1. László Horváth, Fidesz–KDNP (46.2%)
2. Gábor Vona, Jobbik (41.9%)
3. Bálint János Orosz, MSZP-P (8.30%)
4. János Gyula Reichenberger, LMP (2.30%)
5. Other parties (less than 1%) (1.30%)

2018 parliamentary election: Heves County - 2nd constituency
Party	Candidate	Votes	%	±%
Fidesz–KDNP	László Horváth	25,729	46.15	+9.18
Jobbik	Gábor Vona	23,379	41.94	+6.16
MSZP–Dialogue	Bálint János Orosz	4,632	8.31	as Unity
LMP	János Gyula Reichenberger	1,260	2.26	−0.28
Together	Ágnes Réz	191	0.34	as Unity
Family Party	István Zoltán Pocsai	122	0.22	
SEM	Mónika Búzás	106	0.19	+0.02
EU.ROM	Lajos Szőcsi	65	0.12	−0.02
Lendülettel	Gábor Elemér Nagy	57	0.1	
ÖP	József Birtalan	44	0.08	−0.03
Order Party	Dávid Hegedűs	43	0.08	
Medete Party	Henrietta Gazsi	38	0.07	
Motherland Party	Judit Töviskesné Dsupin	35	0.06	−0.3
Iránytű	Zsolt Zvara	27	0.05	
EMMO	Béláné Suha	19	0.03	
Majority		2,350	4.21	
Turnout		56,599	71.49	▲5.37
Registered electors		79,168		
Fidesz–KDNP hold		Swing	+3.0	

=== 2014 election ===
Result 2014
1. László Dezső Horváth, Fidesz–KDNP (37.0%)
2. Gábor Vona, Jobbik (35.8%)
3. Dr. Tamás Sós, Unity (22.2%)
4. Dr. Ákos Csarnó, LMP (2.50%)
5. Other parties (less than 1%) (2.50%)

2014 parliamentary election: Heves County - 2nd constituency
Party	Candidate	Votes	%	±%
Fidesz–KDNP	László Dezső Horváth	19,789	36.97	
Jobbik	Gábor Vona	19,159	35.78	
Unity	Dr. Tamás Sós	11,874	22.17	
LMP	Dr. Zoltán Lukács	1,360	2.54	
KTI	Gábor Ivády	283	0.53	
Motherland Party	János Tenke	193	0.36	
Party of Greens	Mihály Horváth	192	0.36	
SMS	István Subicz	115	0.21	
FKGP	Roland György	92	0.17	
SEM	Krisztina Szegváry	91	0.17	
MCP	Roland Rézműves	90	0.17	
Soc Dems	Sándor Miklós Szabó	80	0.15	
EU.ROM	Jenő Suha	75	0.14	
ÖP	Mónika Egyed	57	0.11	
MSZDP	Rita Schopf	30	0.06	
HATMAP	Gyöngyi Rozinka	27	0.05	
MDU	Ágnes Huszárné Luda	22	0.04	
Rend, Szabadság	Andrea Snep	15	0.03	
Majority		639	1.19	
Turnout		54,191	66.12	
Registered electors		81,964		
Fidesz–KDNP win (new seat)				
