= Parádsasvár =

- Village
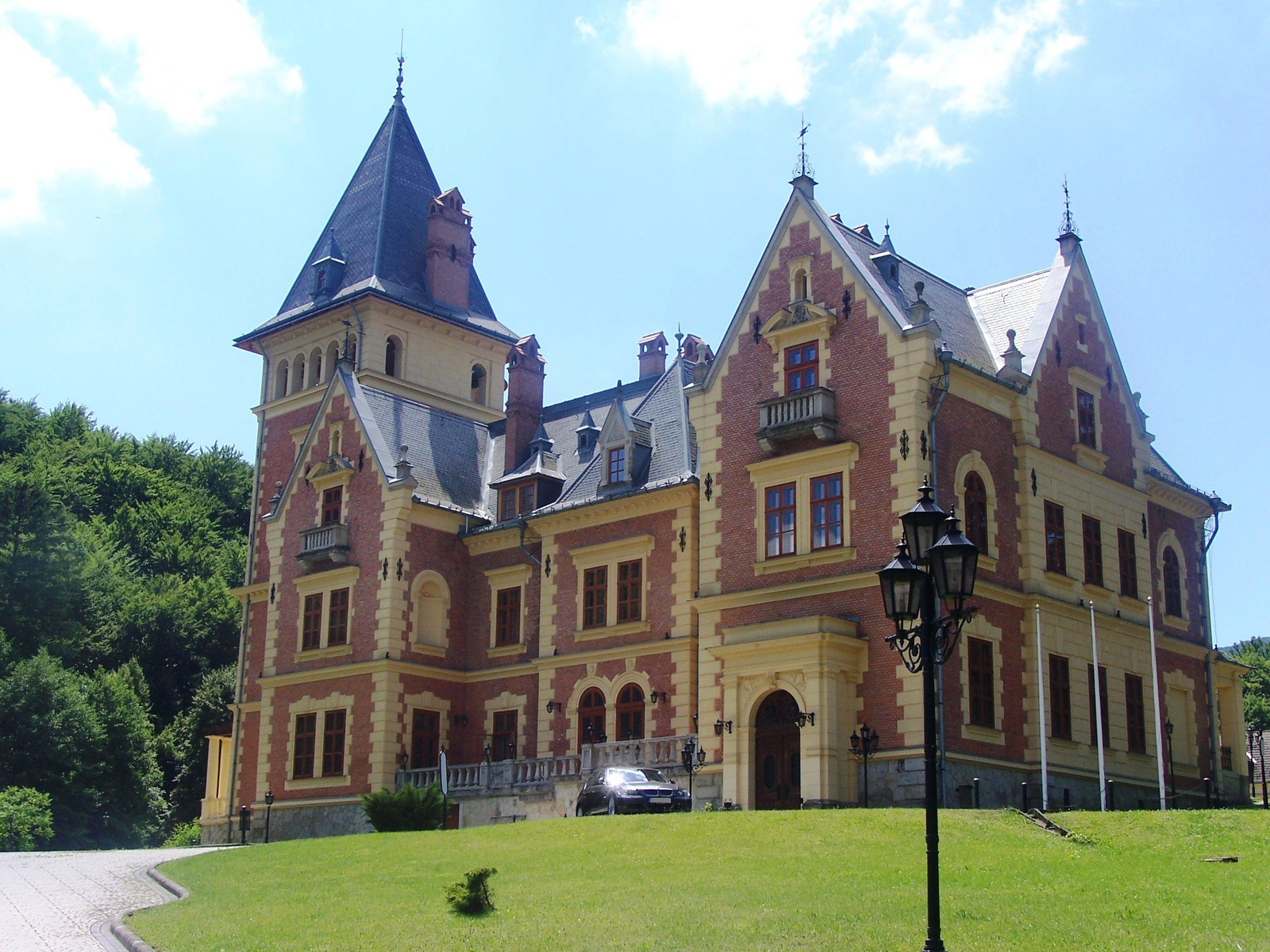
- Károlyi Castle (Hotel)

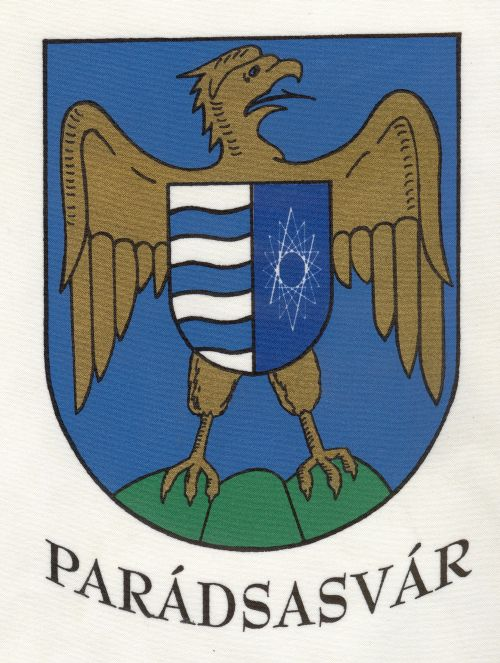
- Coat of arms

- Location in Hungary
- Coordinates: 47°55′01″N 19°58′59″E
- Country: Hungary
- County: Heves
- District: Pétervására
- First mentioned: 1549

Government
  - Mayor: Henrik Holló (Ind.)

Area
  - Total: 16.94 km^{2} (6.54 sq mi)

Population (2022)
  - Total: 335
  - Density: 19.8/km^{2} (51.2/sq mi)
- Time zone: UTC+1 (CET)
  - Summer (DST): UTC+2 (CEST)
- Postal code: 3242
- Area code: 36
- Website: www.paradsasvar.hu

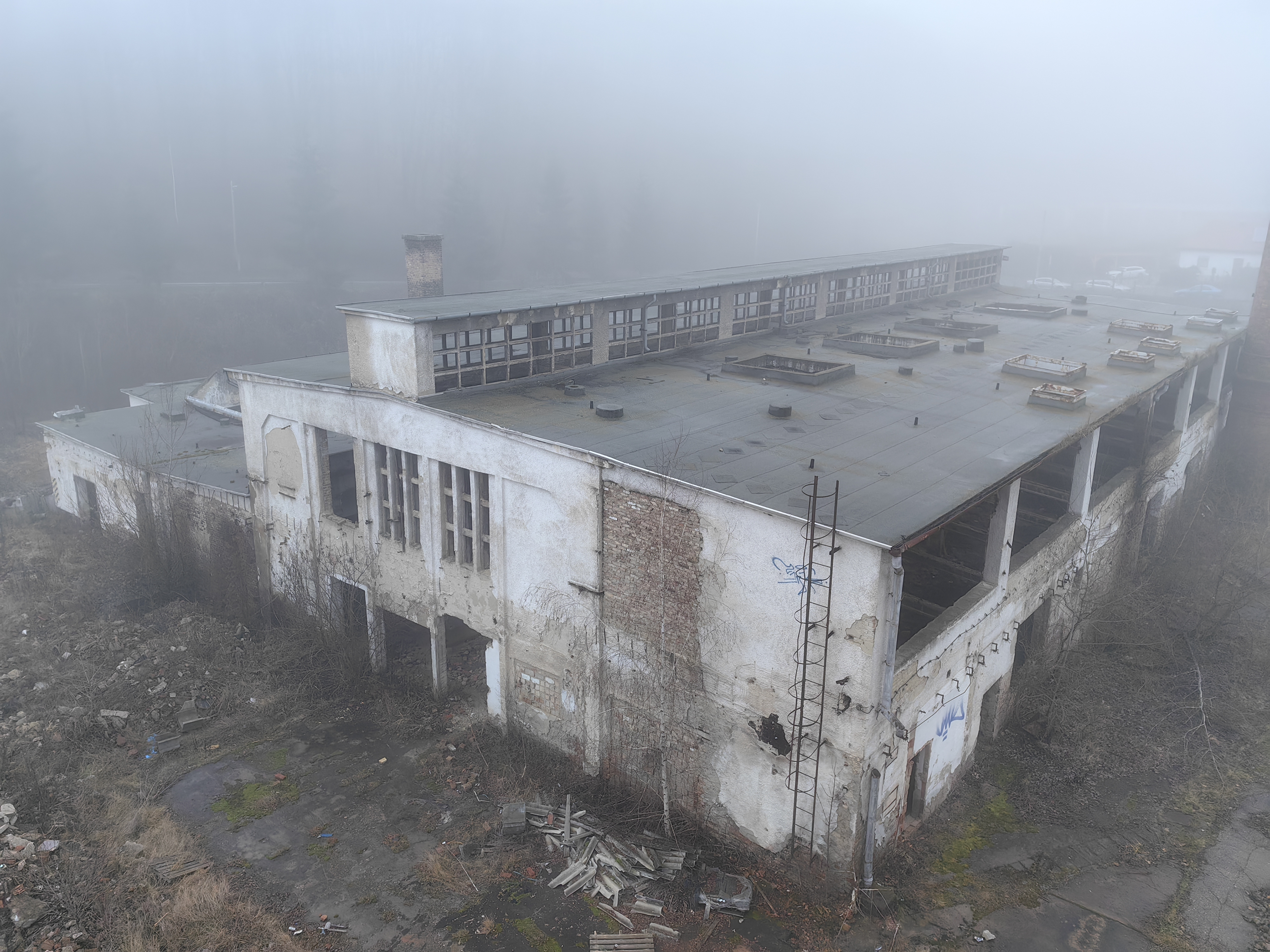
The ruins of the glass factory

Parádsasvár is a village in Heves County, Hungary, in the Mátra mountain range, the bottom of the eastern side of the Galya-tető peak, the Parádi-Tarna creek flows through the settlement. As of 2022 census, it has a population of 335 (see Demographics). The village located 10.7 km from (Nr. 84) Kisterenye–Kál-Kápolna railway line, 25.6 km from the main road 3 and 32.2 km from the M3 motorway. Although the Recsk-Parádfürdő railway station is the closest, but public transport on the railway line ceased on 3 March 2007. The closest train station with public transport in Bátonyterenye 22.7 km far.

== History ==
The settlement was first mentioned in 1549, as the property of Kristóf Országh. The next owner was Eger castle captain Baron Christoph von Ungnad, who mortgaged the area in 1575. It was bought by Baron Sigismund Rákóczi in 1603. Count Antal Grassalkovich acquired the property right in the 1740s, who in 1770 installed the Parád glass huta in Parádsasvár, from which a glass factory was established. Count György Károlyi became the new landlord in 1841, his son Count Gyula Károlyi built the Károlyi Castle in 1881 based on Miklós Ybl, which today operates as a 5-star luxury hotel. The settlement belonged to Bodony and then to Parád under the name Mátrasasvár until 1912. It became an independent settlement in 1958, and that's when it got its current name. The chapel of the village built in 1962 and named as Most Holy Name of the Blessed Virgin Mary. The crystal glass factory, which is prominent in industrial history, closed in 2005, but several entrepreneurs in the settlement continue glass grinding, and polished glass products can be purchased in small manufacturings and shops. Due to its natural features, the mountains provide excellent opportunities for sports, hiking, and getting to know the flora and fauna of the forests.

== Demographics ==
According the 2022 census, 86.8% of the population were of Hungarian ethnicity and 13.2% were did not wish to answer. The religious distribution was as follows: 31.4% Roman Catholic, 4.2% Calvinist, 0.8% Lutheran, 0.8% Greek Catholic, 14.0% non-denominational, and 46.2% did not wish to answer. 353 inhabitants live in the village and 4 people in 2 outskirts rest houses 2 and 3 km far from the village.

Population by years:

Year	1870	1880	1890	1900	1910	1920	1930	1941
Population	254	243	302	330	417	319	305	401
Year	1949	1960	1970	1980	1990	2001	2011	2022
Population	443	645	503	617	614	526	466	335

== Politics ==
Mayors since 1990:

- 1990–: Henrik Holló (independent)

Parádsasvár is one of the few settlements in Hungary, where only one mayor existed since 1990.
