= János Kiss (politician) =

Hungarian politician

Member of the National Assembly
- Incumbent
- Assumed office 9 May 2026
- Preceded by: László Horváth
- Constituency: Heves 2nd

Personal details
- Party: Tisza

János Kiss is a Hungarian politician who was elected member of the National Assembly in 2026 representing the Heves County 2nd constituency. He previously worked as an economist.
