= Sirok =

- Village
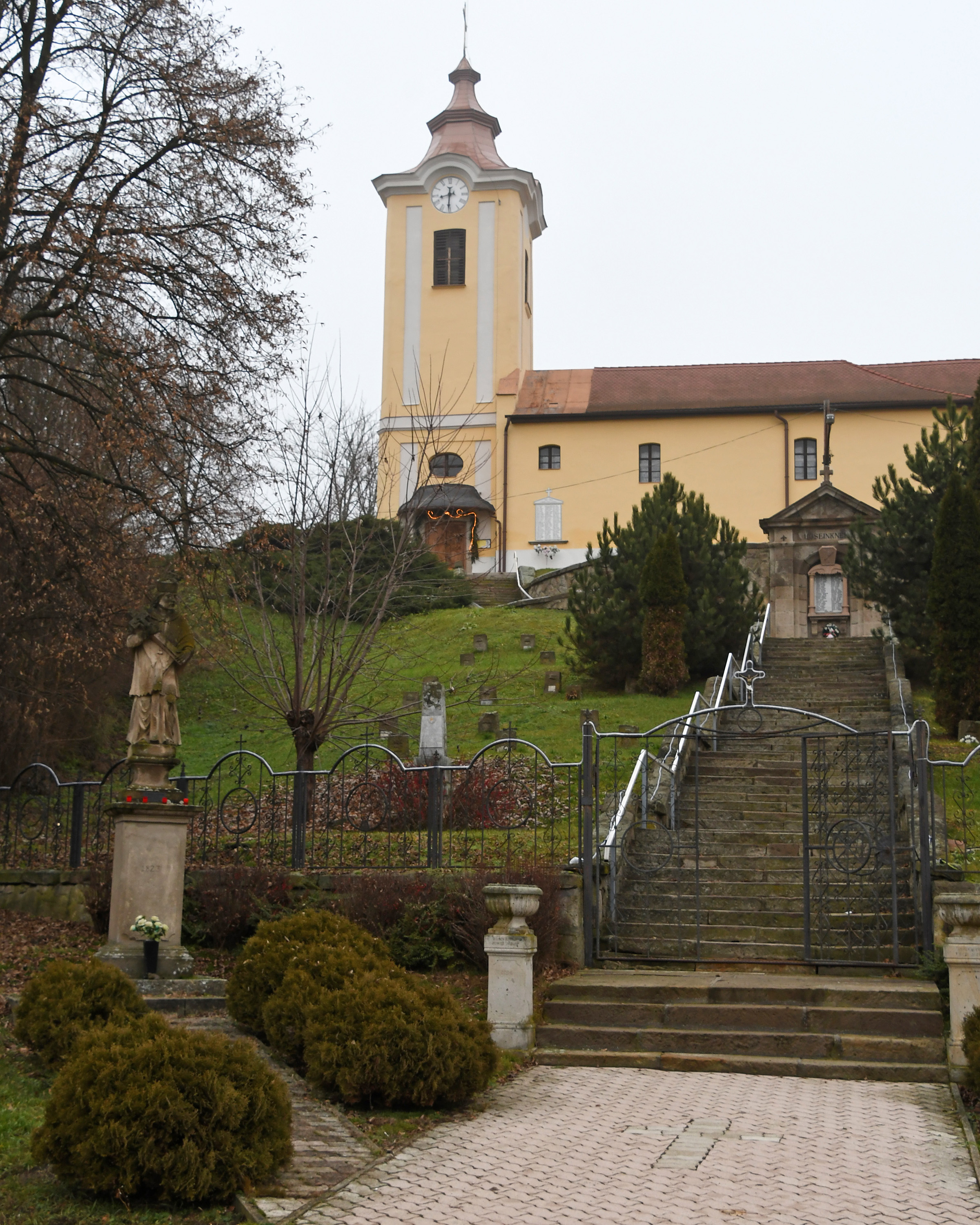
- Immaculate Conception church

- Flag Coat of arms

- Location in Hungary
- Coordinates: 47°55′52″N 20°11′45″E
- Country: Hungary
- County: Heves
- District: Pétervására
- First mentioned: 1302

Government
  - Mayor: Gábor Tuza (Fidesz–KDNP)

Area
  - Total: 63.39 km^{2} (24.48 sq mi)

Population (2022)
  - Total: 1,625
  - Density: 25.63/km^{2} (66.39/sq mi)
- Time zone: UTC+1 (CET)
  - Summer (DST): UTC+2 (CEST)
- Postal code: 3332
- Area code: 36
- Website: www.sirok.hu

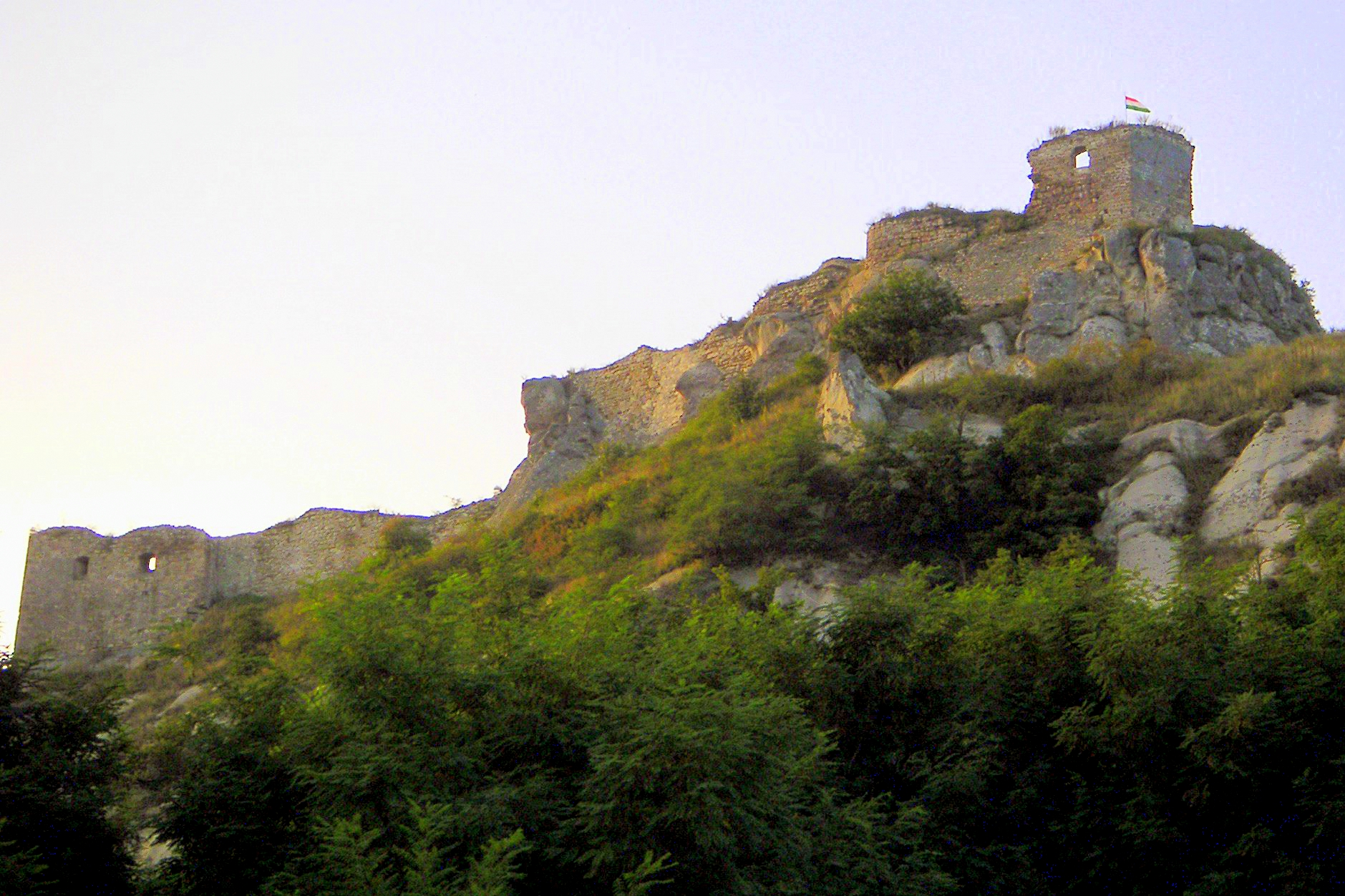
The castle ruins

Sirok is a village in Heves County, Hungary, in the Mátra mountain range, beside of the Tarna River. As of 2022 census, it has a population of 1625 (see Demographics). The village located 18.9 km from Eger, the capital of the county and beside of the (Nr. 84) Kisterenye–Kál-Kápolna railway line, 23.9 km from the main road 3 and 24.5 km from the M25 expressway. Kőkút is located 5.2 km southwest of the center of the village, which is an other inner area of 185 people with its own railway stop. Next to the road leading there is Sirok's own railway stop, 3.5 km from the center. Although the settlement has its two own railway stops, public transport on the railway line ceased on 3 March 2007. The closest train station with public transport is in Eger 20.5 km away.

== History ==
The name comes from the Slavic širokъ—wide like Široka Planina, Široký Důl and many other similar Slavic names. After the Hungarian conquest, the Borh-Bodon branch of the Aba clan took possession of the ancient castle on the site of today's citadel. Sirok then only referred to the castle, the settlement itself was called Sirokalja. The village has a later origin than the castle, because the castle is first mentioned in the old records in 1267, while the first written mention of the village is in 1302 in the form of Sirák. King Charles I declares the castle a royal castle and appoints Imre Kompolthy, as castle master in 1324. The king took it back in 1331 and donated it to a Czech warrior named Ehenyk, after whose death it became a royal castle again in 1337. King Louis I had the castle repaired in 1372. Meanwhile, a colony of servants had already formed in the area below the castle. In 1389 László IV Tari received the castle as a new donation from King Sigismund. At that time, the following localities also belonged to the castle: Verpelét, Nagyberek and Szajla. The village is referred to in several ways: Sirokallya, Sirokvárallya, Syrak and Syrok. In the second half of the 15th century, Sirok already had the character of a town, where it was also a place of customs collection. György Tari gave Sirok in 1465 to Michael Ország, Miklós Kompolthy and Vencel Kompolthy. The Ország and Kompolthy families entered into a mutual succession agreement in 1522, according to which their estates would pass to each other in the event of their death without heirs. Eventually, the castle became the property of Kristóf Országh. Nothing proves the Ottoman threat better than the fact that in 1550 Sirok was already paying taxes to the Ottomans. Kristóf Országh strengthens the castle in 1561 and increases the guard to 100 horsemen. With this, Sirok successfully defended the Tarna valley. But in 1596 the guard left the castle and fell into the hands of the Turks without a fight. The conquerors reinforced the castle, Turkish soldiers and their family members settled in the interior of the castle, but the village remained in the possession of Hungarian landlords until the middle of the 17th century. The castle was recaptured on 22 October 1687, probably also without a siege. King Leopold I put it in order and guarded it. Count Scipio Bagni bought it together with the manors belonging to it in 1693, but the Brudern barons and the Orczys took possession of it after 1711. After the fall of the Rákóczi's War of Independence in 1713, the castle was demolished. Its role in determining the life and destiny of the village has ended permanently.
From the middle of the 18th century, there were three streets in the village according to topographical data other than the data on the serf and serf population. The church of Immaculate Conception built in the centre of the village in 1743. Sirok had 1164 inhabitants and 164 houses in 1828. The Károlyi family became the owner of the village in the 19th century. In the 1920s, many people left the settlement because of the hopeless situation, and in 1928 the grain harvest was destroyed. Those who stayed in the place were engaged in wood cutting, quarrying, and stone carving, at which time they cut most of the cave dwellings for the poor. The current school of the village was built in 1927, which organized cultural events in the settlement. 423 inhabitants lived on farms in 1936. Sirok was considered a large village, where a district registrar functioned. 5 industrial companies operated in the 1930's: a steam mill and 4 quarries. During the Second World War, all Jewish families were deported, only a few of them returned home. The German and Soviet troops fought for five weeks for possession of the settlement in 1944. They ceased to exist and the manor estates were divided after 1945. In the spring of 1951, the construction of the Mátravidéki Fémművek (Matra Provincial Metal Works) began at the Liszkó farm south of the village. The factory started production on 8 August 1952, which contributed to the development of the settlement: a new housing estate was built, a community center, a kindergarten, a restaurant and sports facilities. The majority of the population worked in the factory. A chapel was built in Kőkút in 1996 to meet the needs of the increased population. On 19 June 1999 a flood destroyed the settlement. Between 2010 and 2012, the castle was renovated with European Union support. Sirok is a stamping place of the National Blue Trail. Kőkútpuszta is the start place of the Mátrabérc performance hike, which is the oldest performance hike in the Mátra.

== Demographics ==
According the 2022 census, 93.2% of the population were of Hungarian ethnicity, 4.4% were Gypsies and 6.7% were did not wish to answer. The religious distribution was as follows: 40.1% Roman Catholic, 2.7% Calvinist, 0.9% Greek Catholic, 0.5% Lutheran, 19.4% non-denominational, and 33.4% did not wish to answer. The Gypsies have a local nationality government. 1658 inhabitants live in the village and 6 people in 3 farms.

Population by years:

Year	1870	1880	1890	1900	1910	1920	1930	1941
Population	1491	1343	1687	1900	1494	2017	2270	2325
Year	1949	1960	1970	1980	1990	2001	2011	2022
Population	2024	2476	2765	2643	2474	2100	1978	1625

== Politics ==
Mayors since 1990:

- 1990–2014: István Lakatos (independent, except when supported by the SZDSZ: 1994-1998 and by the ÖHME: 2006-2010)
- 2014–: Gábor Tuza (Fidesz–KDNP)
