= Pétervására District =

Coordinates: 48.0000°N 20.0833°E

Pétervására District Pétervásárai járás
- Districts of Hungary
- Coat of arms

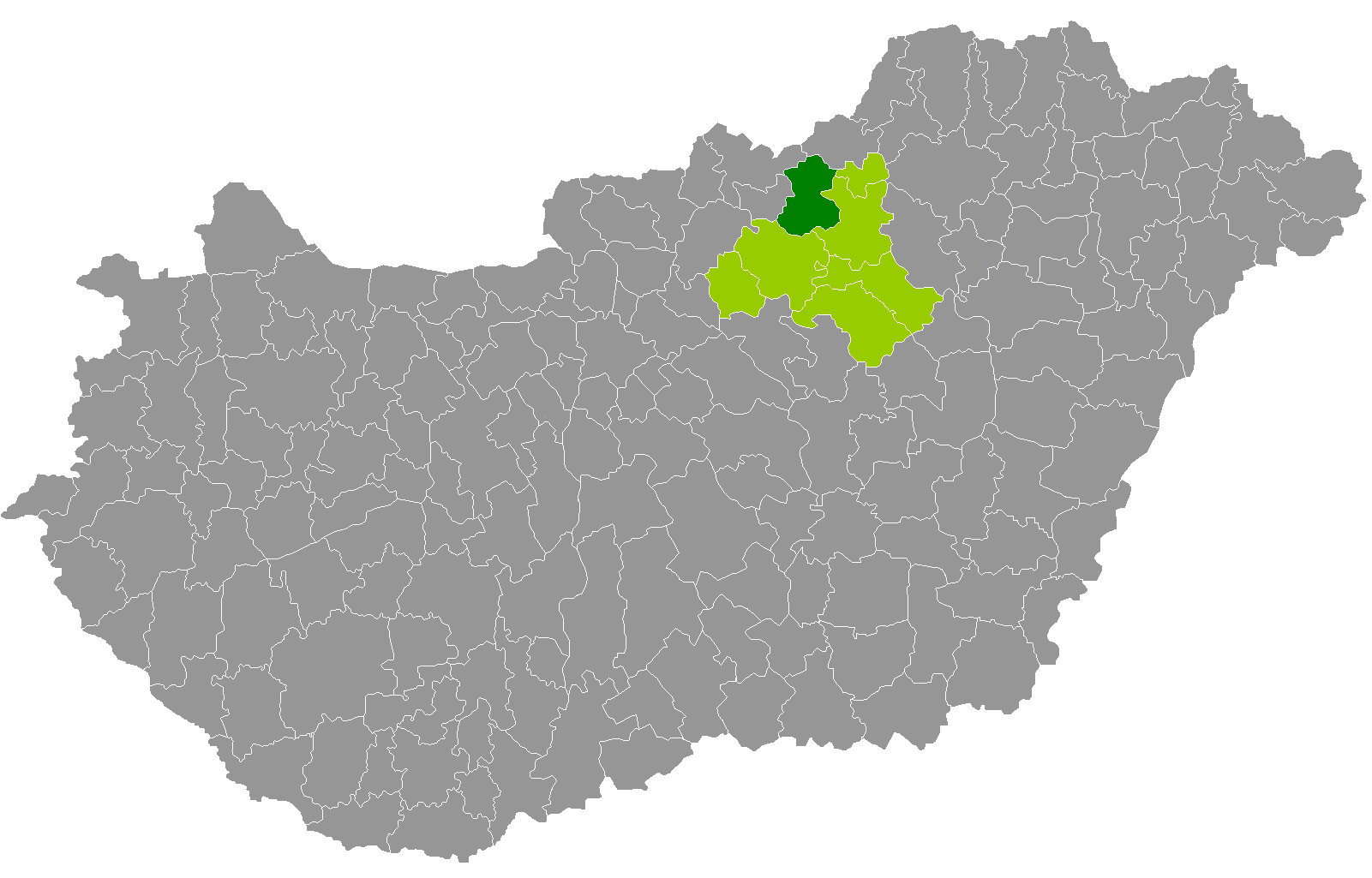
- Pétervására District within Hungary and Heves County.
- Country: Hungary
- County: Heves
- District seat: Pétervására

Area
  - Total: 475.07 km^{2} (183.43 sq mi)
  - Rank: 5th in Heves

Population (2011 census)
  - Total: 21,433
  - Rank: 6th in Heves
  - Density: 45/km^{2} (120/sq mi)

Pétervására (Hungarian: Pétervásárai járás) is a district created in 2013 in the north-western part of Heves County. Pétervására is also the name of the town where the district seat is found. The district is located in the Northern Hungary Statistical Region.

== Geography ==
Pétervására District borders with Salgótarján District (Nógrád County) and Ózd District (Borsod-Abaúj-Zemplén County) to the north, Bélapátfalva District and Eger District to the east, Gyöngyös District to the south, Bátonyterenye District (Nógrád County) to the west. The number of the inhabited places in Pétervására District is 20.

== Municipalities ==
The district has 1 town, 2 large villages and 17 villages. (ordered by population, as of 1 January 2012)

- Bodony (714)
- Bükkszék (681)
- Bükkszenterzsébet (1,040)
- Erdőkövesd (640)
- Fedémes (309)
- Istenmezeje (1,525)
- Ivád (366)
- Kisfüzes (127)
- Mátraballa (714)
- Mátraderecske (1,839)
- Parád (1,964)
- Parádsasvár (409)
- **Pétervására** (2,464) – district seat
- Recsk (2,656)
- Sirok (1,846)
- Szajla (612)
- Szentdomonkos (447)
- Tarnalelesz (1,663)
- Terpes (194)
- Váraszó (492)

The bolded municipality is city, italics municipalities are large villages.

== Demographics ==
Religion in Pétervására District (2011 census)
1. Catholic Church (64.7%)
2. Greek Catholicism (0.30%)
3. Calvinism (2.20%)
4. Lutheranism (0.30%)
5. Other religions (2.40%)
6. Non-religious (9.00%)
7. Atheists (0.60%)
8. Undeclared (20.5%)

In 2011, it had a population of 21,433 and the population density was 50/km².

Year	County population	Change
2011	21,433	n/a

=== Ethnicity ===
Besides the Hungarian majority, the main minority is the Roma (approx. 2,500).

Total population (2011 census): 21,433
Ethnic groups (2011 census): Identified themselves: 21,622 persons:

- Hungarians: 18,794 (86.92%)
- Gypsies: 2,559 (11.84%)
- Others and indefinable: 269 (1.24%)

Approx. 200 persons in Pétervására District did declare more than one ethnic group at the 2011 census.

=== Religion ===
Religious adherence in the county according to 2011 census:

- Catholic – 13,941 (Roman Catholic – 13,870; Greek Catholic – 68);
- Reformed – 467;
- Evangelical – 60;
- other religions – 519;
- Non-religious – 1,929;
- Atheism – 137;
- Undeclared – 4,380.

== Gallery ==
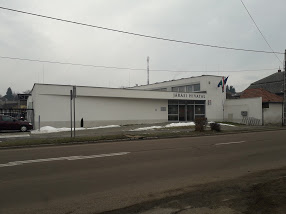
District office, Pétervására

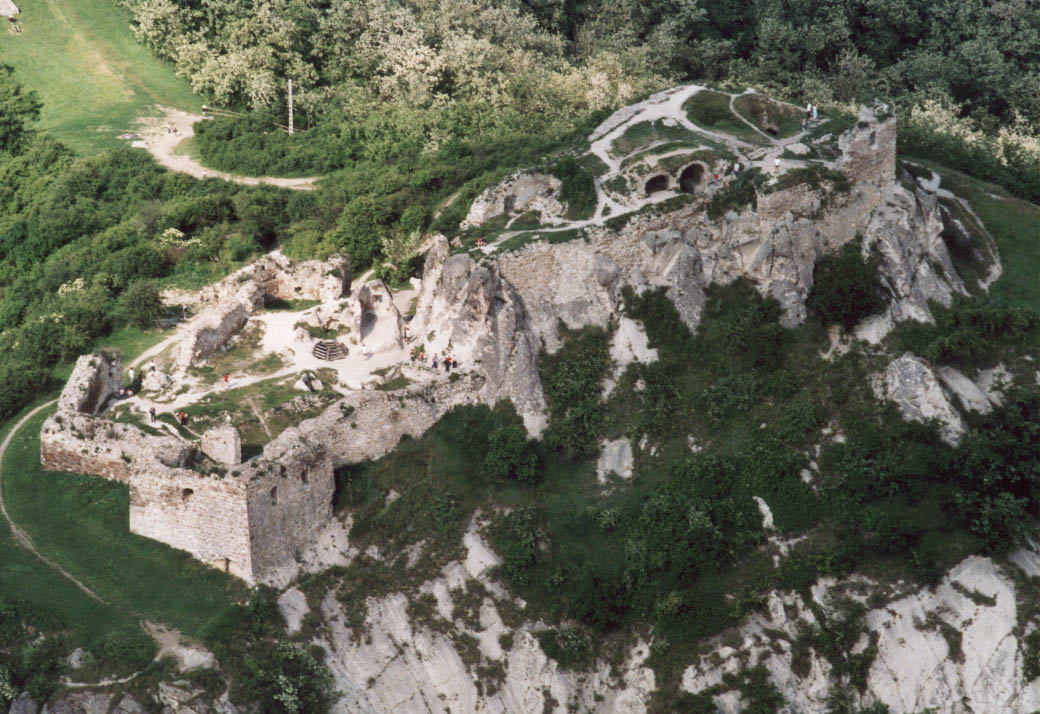
Castle of Sirok

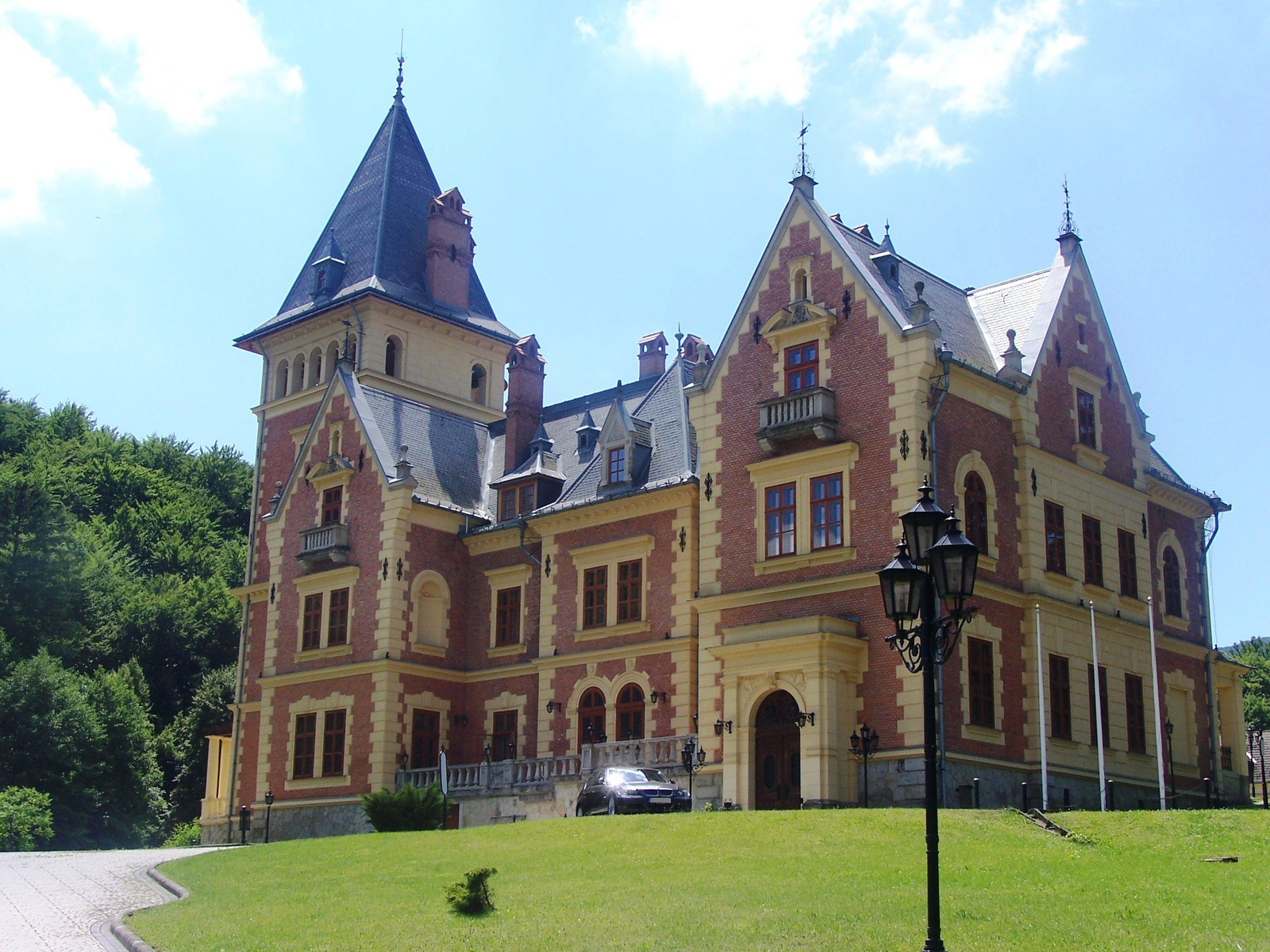
Károlyi Mansion in Parádsasvár

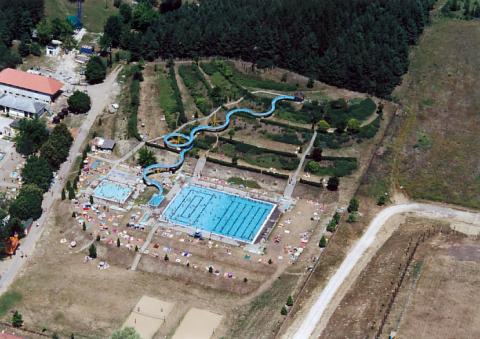
Spa in Bükkszék

== See also ==
- List of cities and towns of Hungary
