= MFS 2000 Inc =

MFS Ammunition
- Native name: Mátravidéki Fémművek
- Type: Ltd.
- Industry: Munitions factory
- Predecessor: MFS 2000 Inc
- Founded: 1952
- Headquarters: Sirok, Hungary
- Owner: RUAG Ammotec Magyarországi Zrt. (RUAG Hungarian Ammotec Inc.)
- Parent: RUAG Ammotec
- Website: https://www.mfs-ammunition.com

MFS Ammunition, formerly known as MFS 2000 Inc, is a Hungarian ammunition manufacturer located in Sirok.

The name MFS is short for Mátravidéki Fémművek – Sirok.

== History ==
It was established in 1952 as Mátravidéki Fémművek (Matra Provincial Metal Works) and began to produce ammunition for the civilian market in the late 1950s. Initial military production declined during the 1960s and 1970s in favour of civilian production. The company produced military ammunition with a plant code of "23". Factory code "21" is also associated with the company.

After the Cold War and the ending of the Warsaw Pact, the company was privatized in 1990 as Magyar Löszergyártó Kft. ("Hungarian Ammunition Manufacturers, Ltd."). They were reincorporated in 1999 as Mátravidéki Fémmüvek – Sirok 2000, Zrt. (Matra Province Metal Works – Sirok 2000 Ltd.), or MFS 2000 Inc.

MFS is one of a relatively small number of producers of commercial 7.62×39mm hunting ammunition. It was subcontracted by Fiocchi America under its Fiocchi Int'l brand to manufacture 7.65×17mm Browning (.32 ACP), 9×18mm Makarov (PM), 9×18mm +P Makarov (PMM), and 9×19mm Luger ammunition.

== Controversies ==
In 2008, the company's ammunition featured indirectly in a controversy over supply of Afghan army and police forces by a contractor to the US Army. Instead of higher-quality MFS ammunition, Miami-based AEY Inc. provided corroded Chinese surplus ammunition sourced from Albania, leading to termination of the Army contract. The Chinese ammunition was bulk packed in clear plastic garbage bags and repackaged in repainted wooden equipment crates that were falsely labeled as being recently made by Czech ammunition maker Sellier & Bellot.

== Up till now ==
In 2009 the firm was acquired by the premium ammunition producer of RUAG Ammotech Group (Norma, RWS, Geco, Rottweil and Swiss P ammunition) and was renamed RUAG Ammotec Magyarországi Zrt. (RUAG Hungarian Ammotec Inc.). They produce: .380 Auto, .38 Special, .44 Magnum,.357 Magnum, .40 S&W, .45 ACP, 9x19, 9x21, 7,65Br, 9x18 Makarov, 7.62x39, 7,62x54R, 5,5645 SS109 ammunition.

Major investment was made into the increase of capacity and quality management processes . web page: https://www.mfs-ammunition.com

== See also ==
- Prvi Partizan
