= Bodony =

- Village
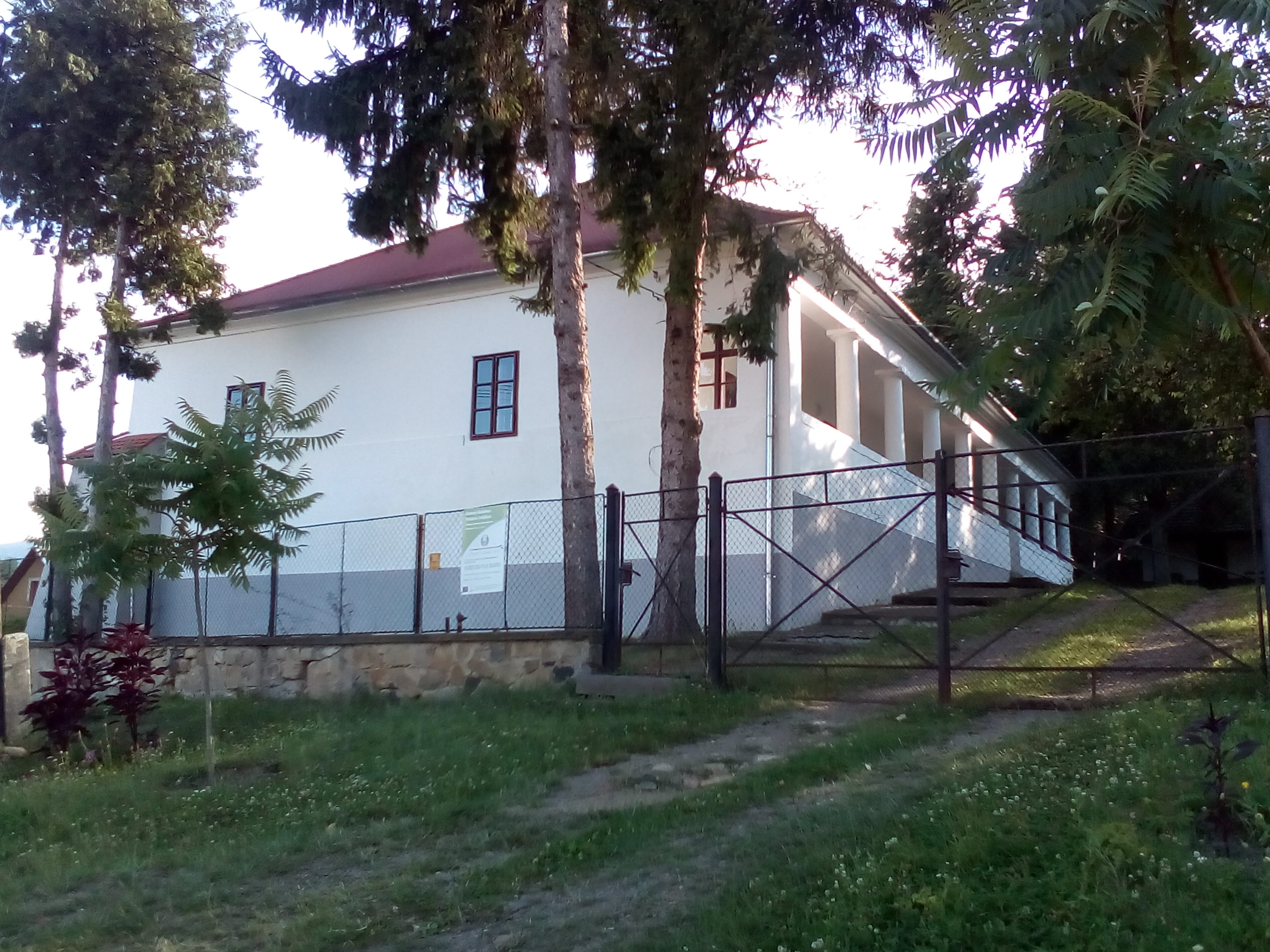
- Parish house of the Saint Michael church

- Coat of arms

- Location in Hungary
- Coordinates: 47°56′28″N 20°01′19″E
- Country: Hungary
- County: Heves
- District: Pétervására
- First mentioned: 1275

Government
  - Mayor: János Vince (Ind.)

Area
  - Total: 28.96 km^{2} (11.18 sq mi)

Population (2022)
  - Total: 684
  - Density: 23.6/km^{2} (61.2/sq mi)
- Time zone: UTC+1 (CET)
  - Summer (DST): UTC+2 (CEST)
- Postal code: 3243
- Area code: 36
- Website: www.bodony.hu

Bodony is a village in Heves County, Hungary, in the Mátra mountain range, beside of the Áldozó and Kata-réti creeks. As of 2022 census, it has a population of 684 (see Demographics). The village located 5.9 km from (Nr. 84) Kisterenye–Kál-Kápolna railway line, 30.7 km from the main road 3 and 37.3 km from the M3 motorway. Although the Mátraderecske railway stop is the closest, but public transport on the railway line ceased on 3 March 2007. The closest train station with public transport in Bátonyterenye 24,6 km far.

== History ==
The first written mention of the settlement dates from 1275, but it was actually inhabited even earlier, as indicated by the names of the Huns' graves in the Áldozó valley. The church was built near the confluence of two streams in the village, and is decorated with 13th-century frescos. The Mátra mountains are clearly visible from the settlement, which is why a lookout tower was built in the settlement. Cheese and honey are made in the Bodony, and the memories of the pottery industry are kept by the Museum of the Past and Present.

== Demographics ==
According the 2022 census, 93.3% of the population were of Hungarian ethnicity, 16.8% were Gypsies, 0.7% were Slovakians and 6.2% were did not wish to answer. The religious distribution was as follows: 50.1% Roman Catholic, 2.4% Calvinist, 10.3% non-denominational, and 33.1% did not wish to answer. The Gypsies have a local nationality government. No population in farms.

Population by years:

Year	1870	1880	1890	1900	1910	1920	1930	1941
Population	1556	1467	1598	1783	1684	1872	1931	1900
Year	1949	1960	1970	1980	1990	2001	2011	2022
Population	1472	1437	1270	1183	1009	873	807	684

== Politics ==
Mayors since 1990:

- 1990–1994: Imre Kovács (independent)
- 1994–2010: László Borsos (independent)
- 2010–2019: István Kovács (independent, but from 2014 supported by the Fidesz–KDNP)
- 2019–: János Vince (independent)
