= Mátralába =

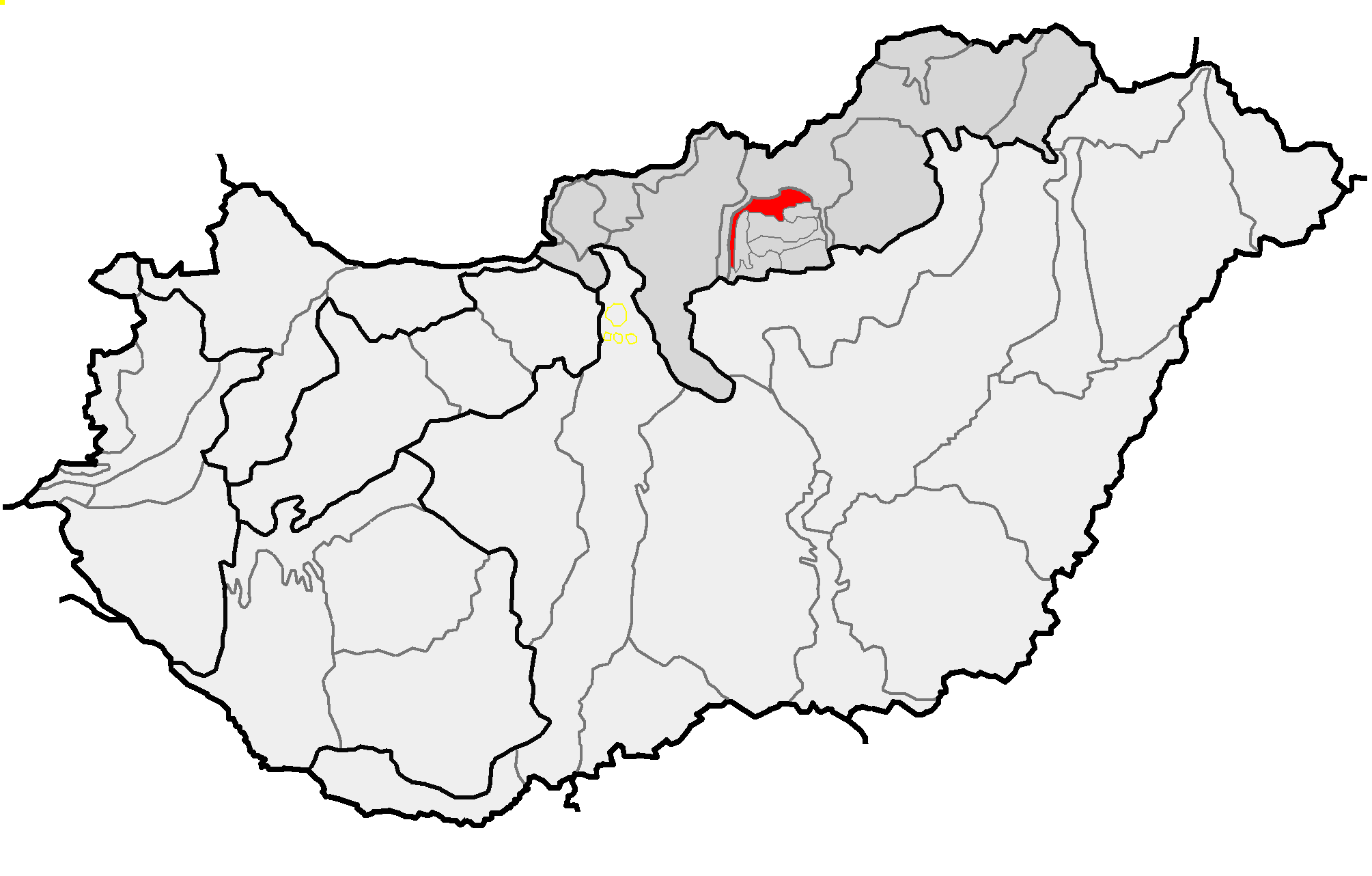
Location of Mátralába (red) within physical subdivisions of Hungary

Mátralába is a hilly region north of Mátra Mountains in Hungary.

== See also ==
- Geography of Hungary
- North Hungarian Mountains
- Mátra
