= Szentdomonkos =

- Village (község)
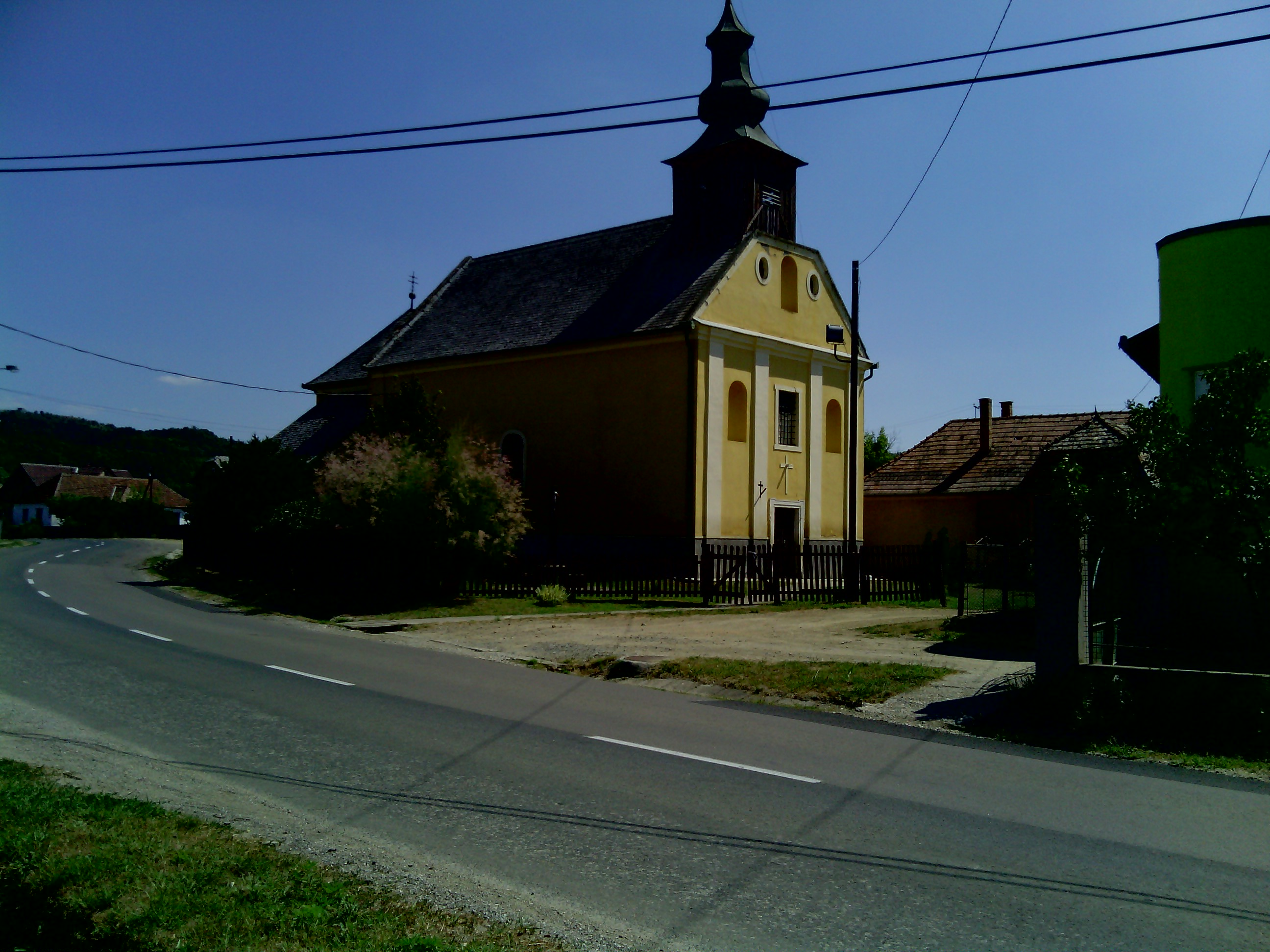
- St. Dominic's Church

- Coat of arms

- Location of Heves County in Hungary

- Location in Hungary
- Coordinates: 48°04′16″N 20°11′53″E
- Country: Hungary
- Region: Northern Hungary
- County: Heves County
- District: Pétervására

Government
  - Mayor: Zoltán Kovács (Ind.)

Area
  - Total: 18.4 km^{2} (7.1 sq mi)

Population (2015)
  - Total: 406
  - Density: 22.1/km^{2} (57.1/sq mi)
- Time zone: UTC+1 (CET)
  - Summer (DST): UTC+2 (CEST)
- Postal code: 3259
- Area code: 36
- Website: http://www.szentdomonkos.hu/

Szentdomonkos is a village in Heves County, Hungary.
