= Ivád =

- Village (község)
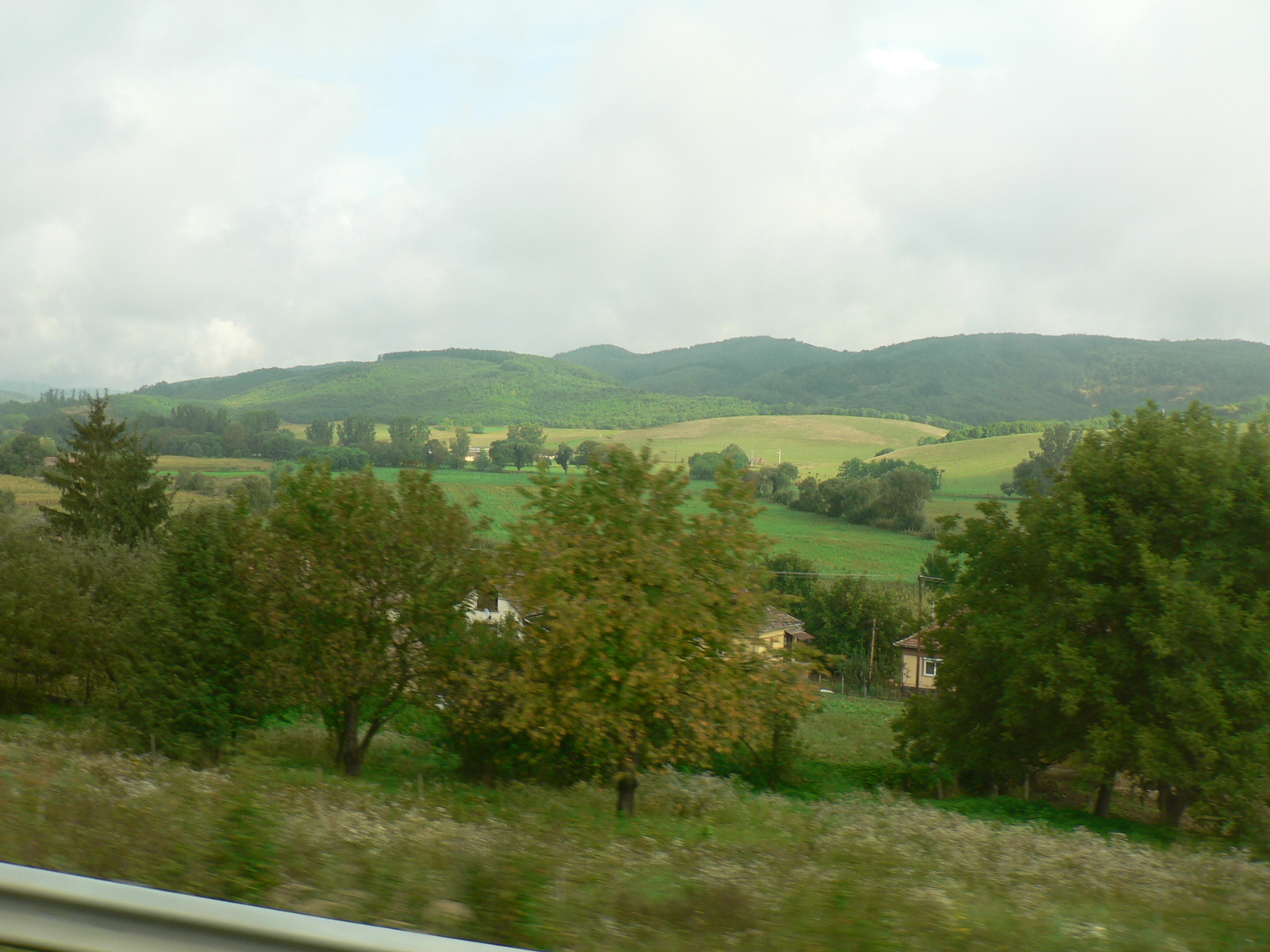

- Coat of arms

- Location of Heves County in Hungary

- Location in Hungary
- Coordinates: 48°01′19″N 20°03′43″E
- Country: Hungary
- Region: Northern Hungary
- County: Heves County
- District: Pétervására

Government
  - Mayor: Valyon László (Fidesz-KDNP)

Area
  - Total: 11.94 km^{2} (4.61 sq mi)

Population (2015)
  - Total: 365
  - Density: 30.6/km^{2} (79.2/sq mi)
- Time zone: UTC+1 (CET)
  - Summer (DST): UTC+2 (CEST)
- Postal code: 3248
- Area code: 36
- Website: http://www.ivad.hu/

Ivád is a village in Heves County, Hungary.
