= Istenmezeje =

- Village (község)
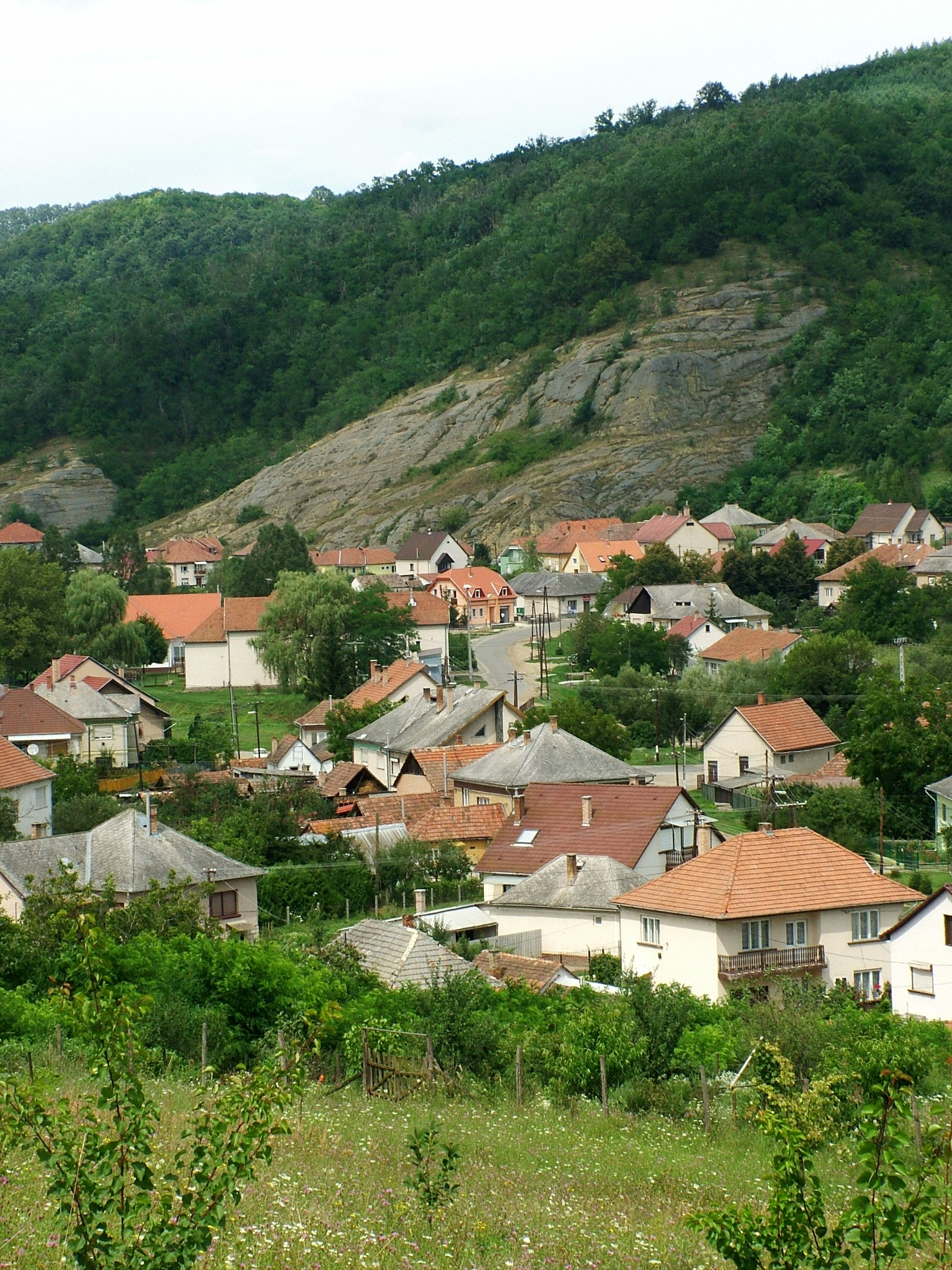

- Coat of arms

- Location of Heves County in Hungary

- Location in Hungary
- Coordinates: 48°05′10″N 20°03′18″E
- Country: Hungary
- Region: Northern Hungary
- County: Heves County
- District: Pétervására

Government
  - Mayor: Nagy Péter (Ind.)

Area
  - Total: 32.79 km^{2} (12.66 sq mi)

Population (2015)
  - Total: 1,600
  - Density: 49/km^{2} (130/sq mi)
- Time zone: UTC+1 (CET)
  - Summer (DST): UTC+2 (CEST)
- Postal code: 3253
- Area code: 36
- Website: http://www.istenmezeje.hu/

Istenmezeje is a village in Heves County, Hungary.
