= Bükkszenterzsébet =

- Village (község)
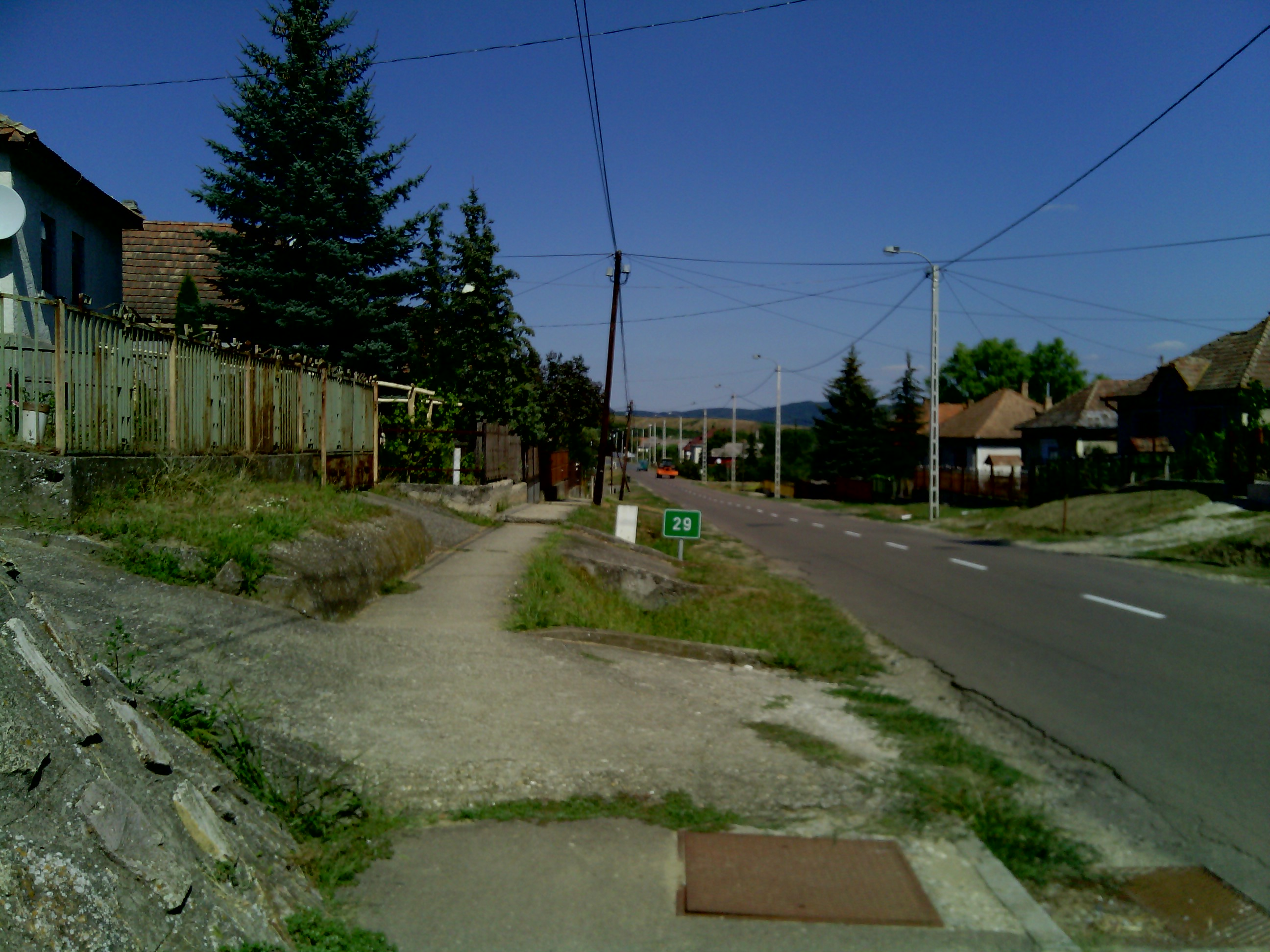

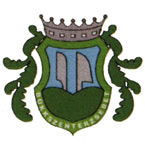
- Coat of arms

- Location of Heves County in Hungary

- Location in Hungary
- Coordinates: 48°03′07″N 20°09′47″E
- Country: Hungary
- Region: Northern Hungary
- County: Heves County
- District: Pétervására

Government
  - Mayor: Ortó Szilárd (Ind.)

Area
  - Total: 24.86 km^{2} (9.60 sq mi)

Population (2015)
  - Total: 1,067
  - Density: 42.92/km^{2} (111.2/sq mi)
- Time zone: UTC+1 (CET)
  - Summer (DST): UTC+2 (CEST)
- Postal code: 3257, 3258
- Area code: 36
- Website: http://www.bukkszenterzsebet.hu/

Bükkszenterzsébet is a village in Heves County, Hungary.
