= Erdőkövesd =

- Village (község)
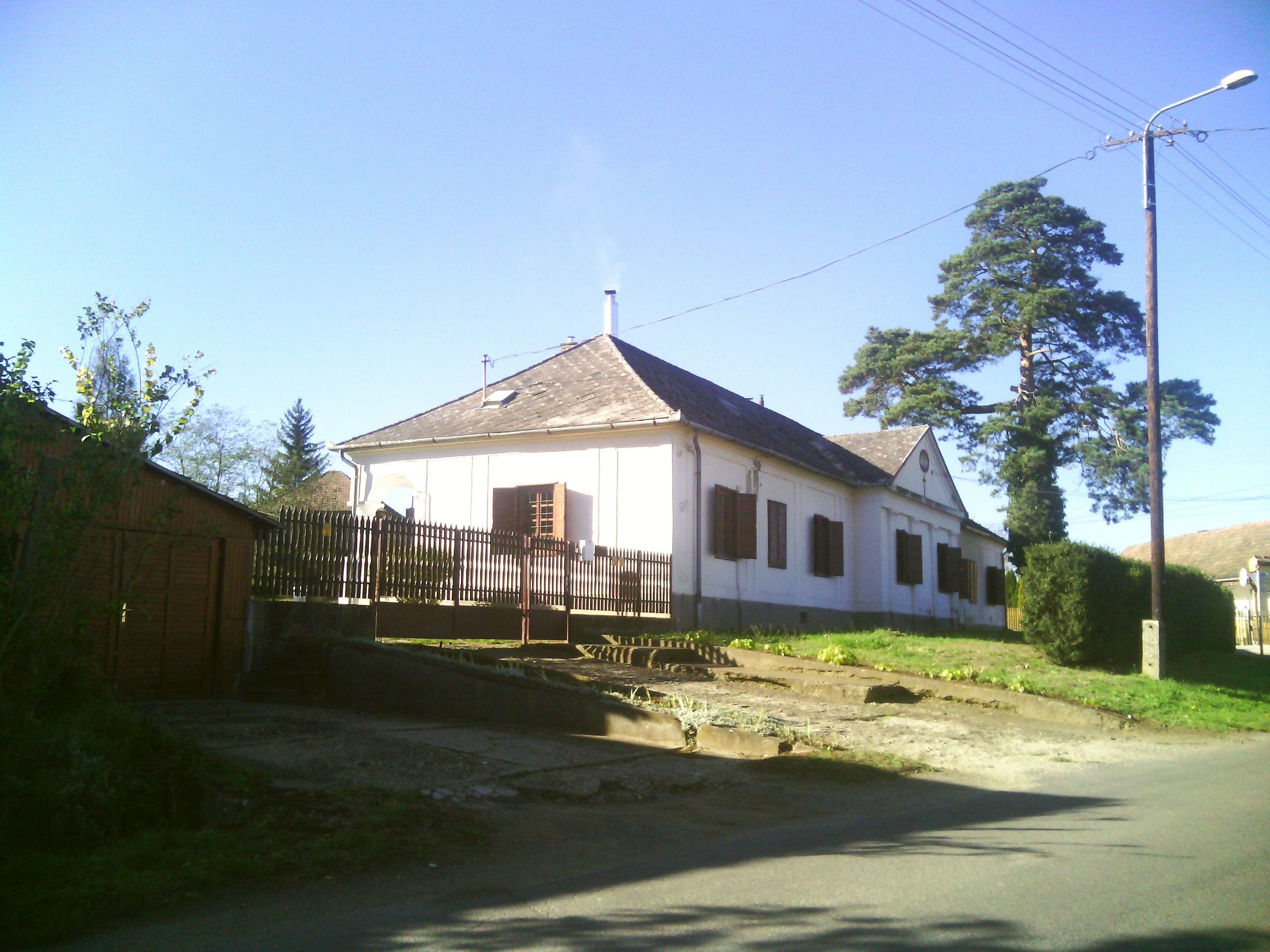

- Coat of arms

- Location of Heves County in Hungary

- Location in Hungary
- Coordinates: 48°02′28″N 20°06′04″E
- Country: Hungary
- Region: Northern Hungary
- County: Heves County
- District: Pétervására

Government
  - Mayor: Gombás Dezsőné (Fidesz-KDNP)

Area
  - Total: 17.18 km^{2} (6.63 sq mi)

Population (2015)
  - Total: 656
  - Density: 38.2/km^{2} (98.9/sq mi)
- Time zone: UTC+1 (CET)
  - Summer (DST): UTC+2 (CEST)
- Postal code: 3252
- Area code: 36

Erdőkövesd is a village in Heves County, Hungary.
