= Róbert Dudás =

Hungarian politician (born 1973)

Róbert Dudás (born Eger, 11 December 1973) Hungarian political scientist, international relations expert, politician, since 2019. Member of Hungarian National Assembly and vice-president of Jobbik.

== Family ==
He is married and has 2 children.

== Early life ==
In 2009 he graduated from College of Esterházy Károly in political science. He got a state qualification in English language.

== Political career ==
In 2009 he joined to Jobbik. He was the mayor of Mátraballa between 2014 and 2019.

Since 2019, he has been a member of Hungarian National Assembly. On 25 January 2020, he was elected for vice-president of Jobbik.
