= Kisfüzes =

- Village (község)
- Coat of arms

- Location of Heves County in Hungary

- Location in Hungary
- Coordinates: 47°59′17″N 20°07′37″E
- Country: Hungary
- Region: Northern Hungary
- County: Heves County
- District: Pétervására

Government
  - Mayor: Menyhárt Balázs (Ind.)

Area
  - Total: 4.81 km^{2} (1.86 sq mi)

Population (2015)
  - Total: 130
  - Density: 27/km^{2} (70/sq mi)
- Time zone: UTC+1 (CET)
  - Summer (DST): UTC+2 (CEST)
- Postal code: 3256
- Area code: 36
- Website: http://www.kisfuzes.hu/

Kisfüzes is a village in Heves County, Hungary.
