= Parád =

- Large Village
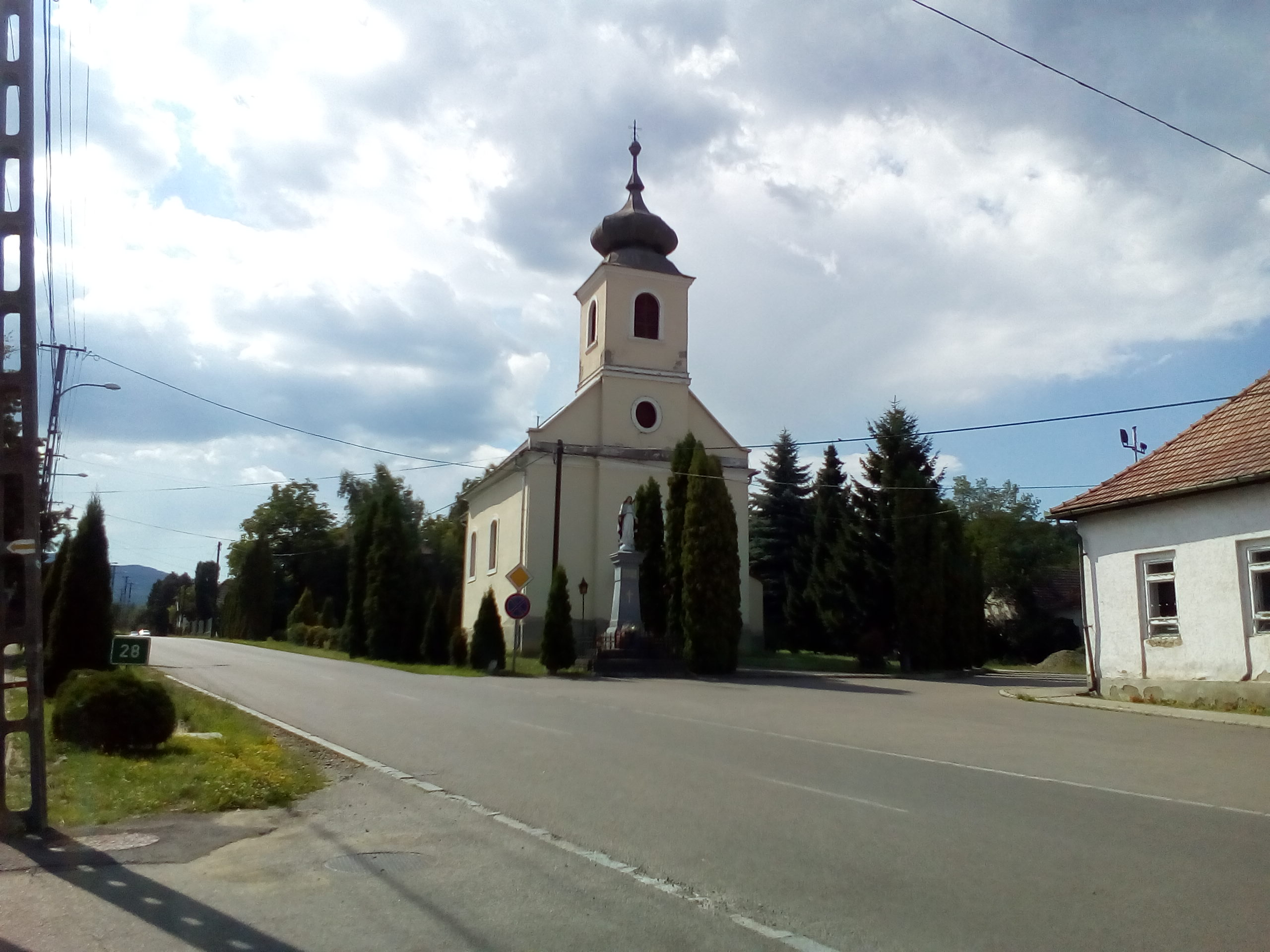
- Saint Ottilia church

- Coat of arms

- Location in Hungary
- Coordinates: 47°55′26″N 20°02′3″E
- Country: Hungary
- County: Heves
- District: Pétervására
- First mentioned: 1506

Government
  - Mayor: József Mudriczki (Ind.)

Area
  - Total: 37.20 km^{2} (14.36 sq mi)

Population (2022)
  - Total: 1,862
  - Density: 50.05/km^{2} (129.6/sq mi)
- Time zone: UTC+1 (CET)
  - Summer (DST): UTC+2 (CEST)
- Postal code: 3240, 3244
- Area code: 36
- Website: www.parad.hu

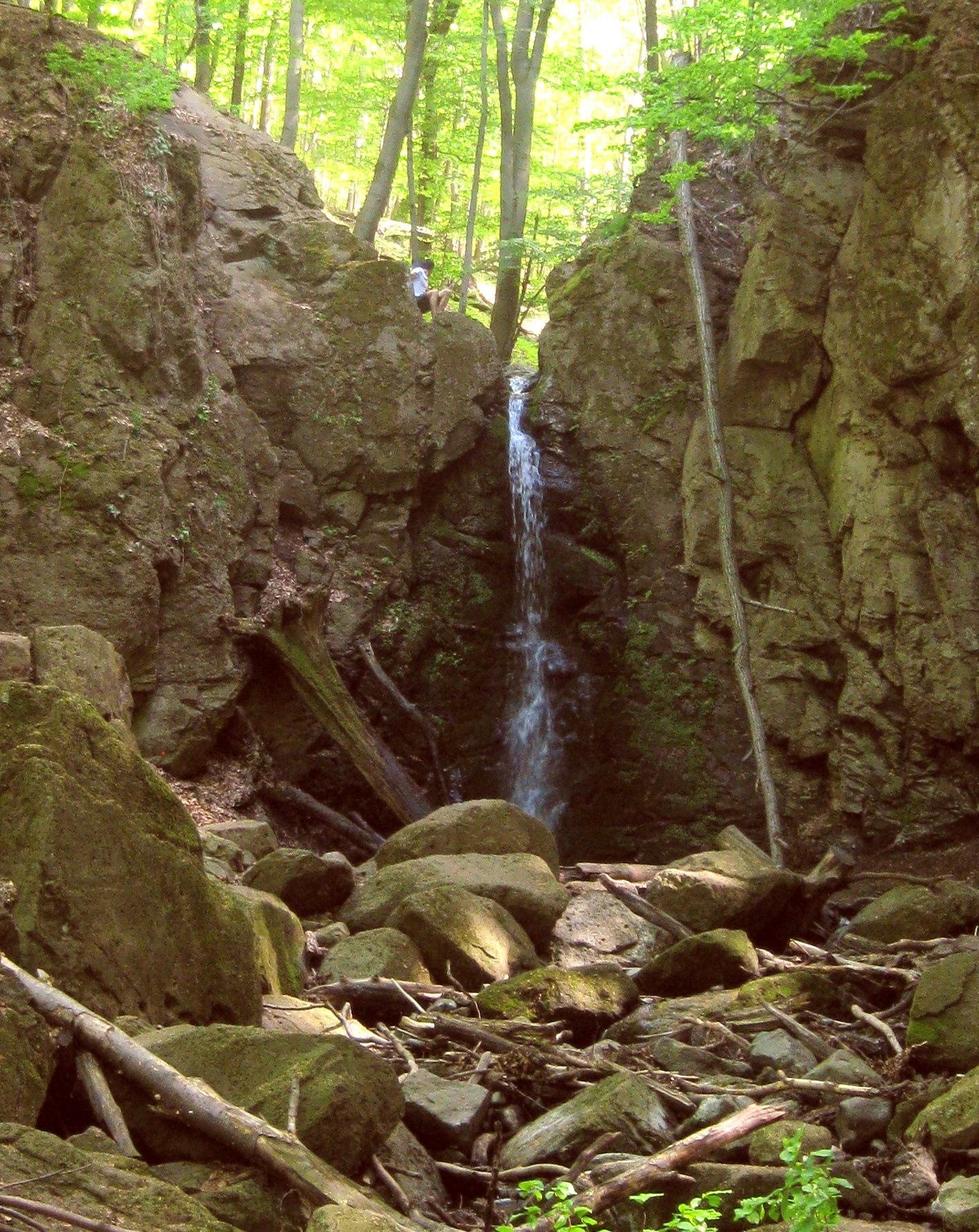
Ilona waterfall

Parád is a large village in Heves County, Hungary, in the Mátra mountain range, the bottom of the northern side of the Kékes peak, beside of the Parádi-Tarna creek. As of 2022 census, it has a population of 1862 (see Demographics). The village located 6.4 km from (Nr. 84) Kisterenye–Kál-Kápolna railway line, 27.9 km from the main road 3 and 34.5 km from the M3 motorway. Although the Recsk-Parádfürdő railway station is the closest, but public transport on the railway line ceased on 3 March 2007. The closest train station with public transport in Gyöngyös 26,9 km far. The eastern end of the village (Parádfürdő) have an own postal code (3244).

== History ==
The settlement was first mentioned in a document in 1506, when it was mentioned as Parad. In the 17th century, the settlement came into the possession of the Rákóczi family. Prince Francis II Rákóczi established a glass huta called Parádóhuta, which he later moved to Parádsasvár. The later owners developed the glass huta into a factory. Queen Maria II ordered an inventory of the country's mineral waters in 1763. Ferenc Markhot, the medical officer of the county, discovered mineral water containing alum, which was already used to treat leg pain, leg tumors and ulcers. The alum factory began operating in 1778. The alum water was mainly used for skin diseases and malignant rashes. As a result of using the water, a new part of the settlement is born: Parádfürdő. The first bath house was built in 1795 by Baron József Orczy, the owner of the estate. András Fáy was the first well-to-do spa guest of the spa, but Lajos Kossuth also tried to restore his shaken health in the baths here. Construction and development continued around the baths, and they became more and more well-known. Noble and aristocratic families traveled to the Parade in the hope of healing, physical and spiritual strengthening. Following the glass factory in Parádsasvár, glassmaking, the production of bath glasses and the bottling of sulfur-hydrocarbonate sour water appeared. Glass art making is still practiced today in Parád, although the glass factory has ceased to exist. A grinding workshop was set up to make crystal glasses in 1803. The church of the village built in 1768 and its frecos made in 1966.
The village was owned by the Károlyi family for almost a hundred years from 1847, who enriched the settlement with numerous architectural values. Count György Károlyi built the Cifra stable in 1869, the Károlyi castle in 1872 and the hospital building in Parádfürdő, based on the designs of Miklós Ybl. A carriage museum was opened in the Cifra stable in 1971. Count Gyula Károlyi created a park in 1883 beside of the castle and rebuilt the castle in 1889. Later the family built the Erzsébet Park Hotel, opposite the hospital, based on the designs of Miklós Ybl in 1893. Beside the hospital was built the Fresco restaurant, decorated by Jenő Haranghy in 1937. The World Association of Girl Guides and Girl Scouts was formed at the fifth International Guide Conference, held in Parád in 1928. The settlement as one of the centres of the Palóc ethnographic group. The last surviving memory of the wooden constructions in the Mátra was the Palóc House, what was built in 1770 and burned down in 2020. The palóc people's household objects and other memories still visible in the folk museum, close to it the exhibition of wood carver Joachim Asztalos. Parádóhuta's own church was built in the 20th century and named after the Our Lady of the Rosary.

== Health resort ==
At Parádfürdő and in its immediate vicinity, there are three different types of water with excellent healing effects. The alum mine is located about 100 meters from the hospital in Parádfürdő, where the mineral is mined and prepared for treatment. The hospital uses the curative alum-iron water for various treatments. Sour water with sulfur bicarbonate is effective in the case of stomach and intestinal diseases, diabetes, pancreatic and bile diseases, chronic constipation, and catarrhal symptoms (respiratory-urinary catarrh). It is used exclusively in the form of a drinking regimen, and can also be partially purchased commercially. At the southeastern end of Parádóhuta, on the edge of the forest, there is the source of iron-lithium-containing sour water (Clarissa, named after Countess Clarisse Kornis), which increases the temperature of the body with its carbonic acid content, accelerates blood circulation, and is important in blood formation due to its iron content. It is used as an oral cure. The Erzsébet Park Hotel built its own mofetta 100 m from the hospital building in 2010. For the treatments, almost pure carbon dioxide, formed during the volcanic after-action and bursting to the surface from a depth of 1000 m, is used. Mofetta can only be used on medical advice. Gas treatment has been shown to have a beneficial effect in six disease groups: hypertension, heart and peripheral vascular diseases, vascular complications in diabetics, conditions after vascular surgery, bone disorders, neuralgia and chronic skin diseases. The walks in the Ilona valley are also recommended, which is famous for its row of chestnut trees, the waterfall and the sulfur bicarbonate spring named after King Saint Stephen.

== Demographics ==
According the 2022 census, 92.1% of the population were of Hungarian ethnicity, 7.8% were Gypsies, 0.8% were German and 7.6% were did not wish to answer. The religious distribution was as follows: 45.7% Roman Catholic, 4.0% Calvinist, 0.5% Greek Catholic, 14.8% non-denominational, and 32.3% did not wish to answer. The Gypsies have a local nationality government. 1783 inhabitants live in inner areas and 13 people in 3 farms. The other inner area of the village is the outskirt Parádóhuta what is 2.7 km far from the village with 170 people.
The number of the Gypsies grown with 2.8% in the last 20 years.

Population by years:

Year	1870	1880	1890	1900	1910	1920	1930	1941
Population	1459	1396	1733	1897	1931	2040	2122	2327
Year	1949	1960	1970	1980	1990	2001	2011	2022
Population	2138	3004	2618	2553	2434	2310	2155	1862

== Politics ==
Mayors since 1990:

- 1990–2010: Oszkár Nagy (independent, except between 1994 and 1998 when supported by the SZDSZ and the MSZP)
- 2010–: József Mudriczki (independent)

It is an interesting fact that in the settlement election held on 18 October 1998, the village had 8 mayoral candidates, which is much more than the national average.
