= Váraszó =

- Village (község)
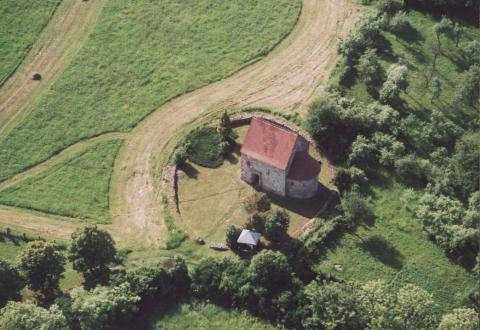

- Coat of arms

- Location of Heves County in Hungary

- Location in Hungary
- Coordinates: 47°3′36″N 20°06′43″E
- Country: Hungary
- Region: Northern Hungary
- County: Heves County
- District: Pétervására

Government
  - Mayor: Pál István László

Area
  - Total: 27.05 km^{2} (10.44 sq mi)

Population (2015)
  - Total: 469
  - Density: 17.3/km^{2} (44.9/sq mi)
- Time zone: UTC+1 (CET)
  - Summer (DST): UTC+2 (CEST)
- Postal code: 3254
- Area code: 36
- Website: http://www.varaszo.hu/

Váraszó is a village in Heves County, Hungary.
