= Fedémes =

- Village (község)
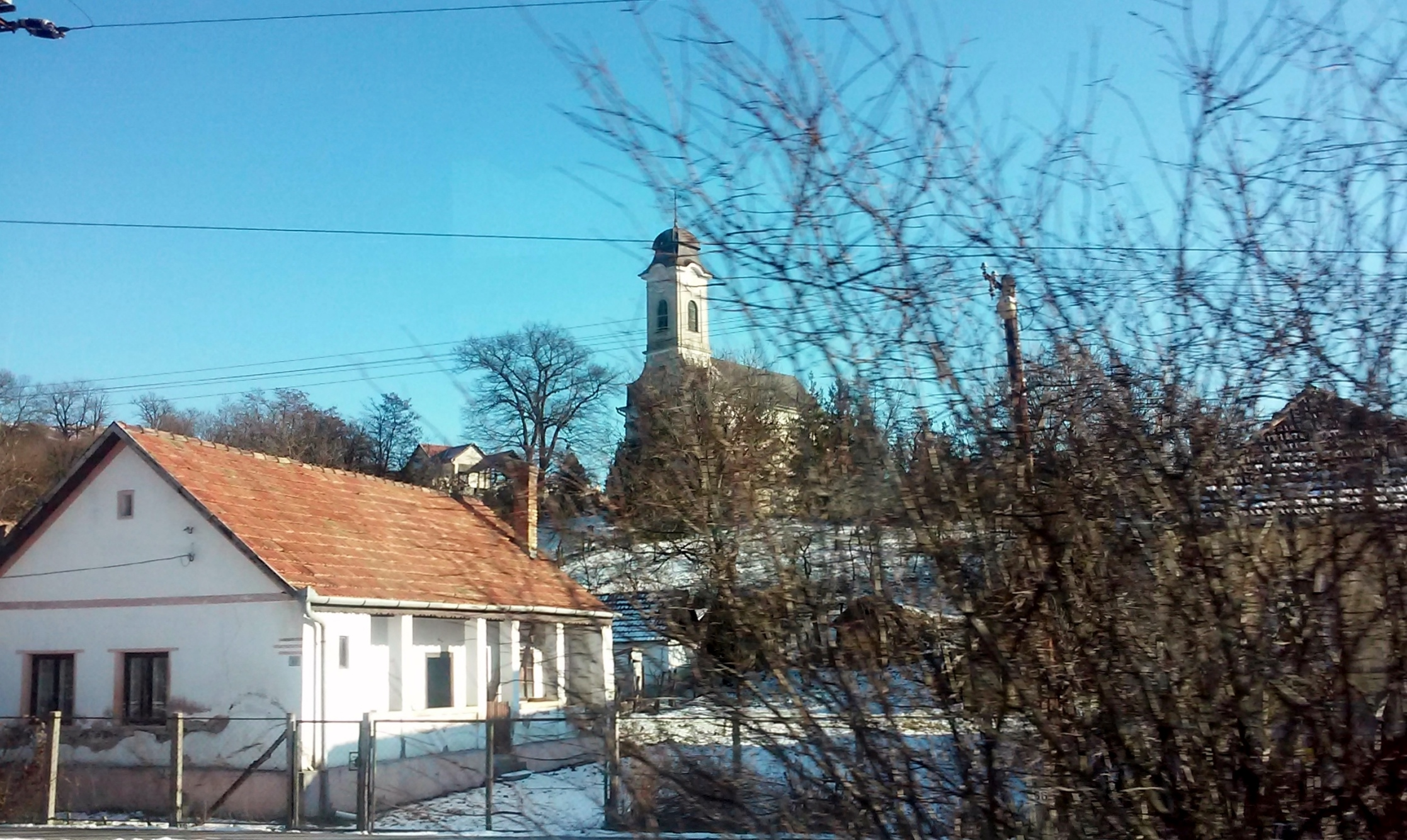

- Coat of arms

- Location of Heves County in Hungary

- Location in Hungary
- Coordinates: 48°01′55″N 20°11′20″E
- Country: Hungary
- Region: Northern Hungary
- County: Heves County
- District: Pétervására

Government
  - Mayor: Válóci István (Ind.)

Area
  - Total: 8.62 km^{2} (3.33 sq mi)

Population (2015)
  - Total: 317
  - Density: 36.8/km^{2} (95.2/sq mi)
- Time zone: UTC+1 (CET)
  - Summer (DST): UTC+2 (CEST)
- Postal code: 3255
- Area code: 36
- Website: http://www.fedemes.hu/

Fedémes is a village in Heves County, Hungary.
