= Tamás Sós =

Hungarian politician

Member of the National Assembly
- In office 15 May 2002 – 5 May 2014

Personal details
- Born: 5 April 1954 (age 72) Eger, Hungary
- Party: MSZMP (?–1989); MSZP (since 1989)
- Other political affiliations: KISZ
- Profession: politician

Tamás Sós (born 5 April 1954) is a Hungarian politician, member of the National Assembly (MP) for Pétervására from 2002 to 2010 (Heves County Constituency II). He was also a Member of Parliament from the Heves County regional list of the Hungarian Socialist Party (MSZP) from 2010 to 2014.

During the campaign period of the 2014 parliamentary election, Sós was the subject of controversy due to allegations of plagiarism in his pedagogy PhD thesis. The Eötvös Loránd University (ELTE) withdrew his doctoral title in April 2014.
