= Bükkszék =

Coordinates: 47°59′N 20°11′E

- Seal
- Interactive map of Bükkszék
- Country: Hungary
- County: Heves

Area
  - Total: 15.3 km^{2} (5.9 sq mi)

Population (2015)
  - Total: 692
  - Density: 57.06/km^{2} (147.8/sq mi)
- Time zone: UTC+1 (CET)
  - Summer (DST): UTC+2 (CEST)
- Postal code: 3335
- Area code: 36

Bükkszék is a village in Pétervására District of Heves County in the north of Hungary, near the town of Eger. The village became famous for its Salvus spa water in the middle of the 20th century.

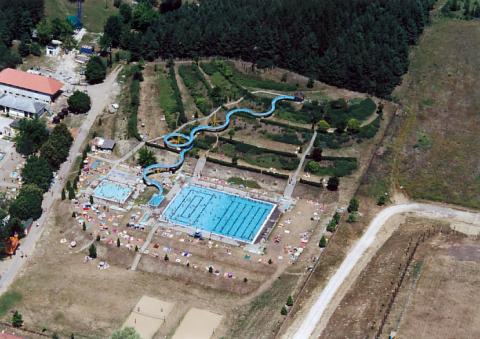
Bükkszék spa - aerial view
