= Terpes =

- Village (község)
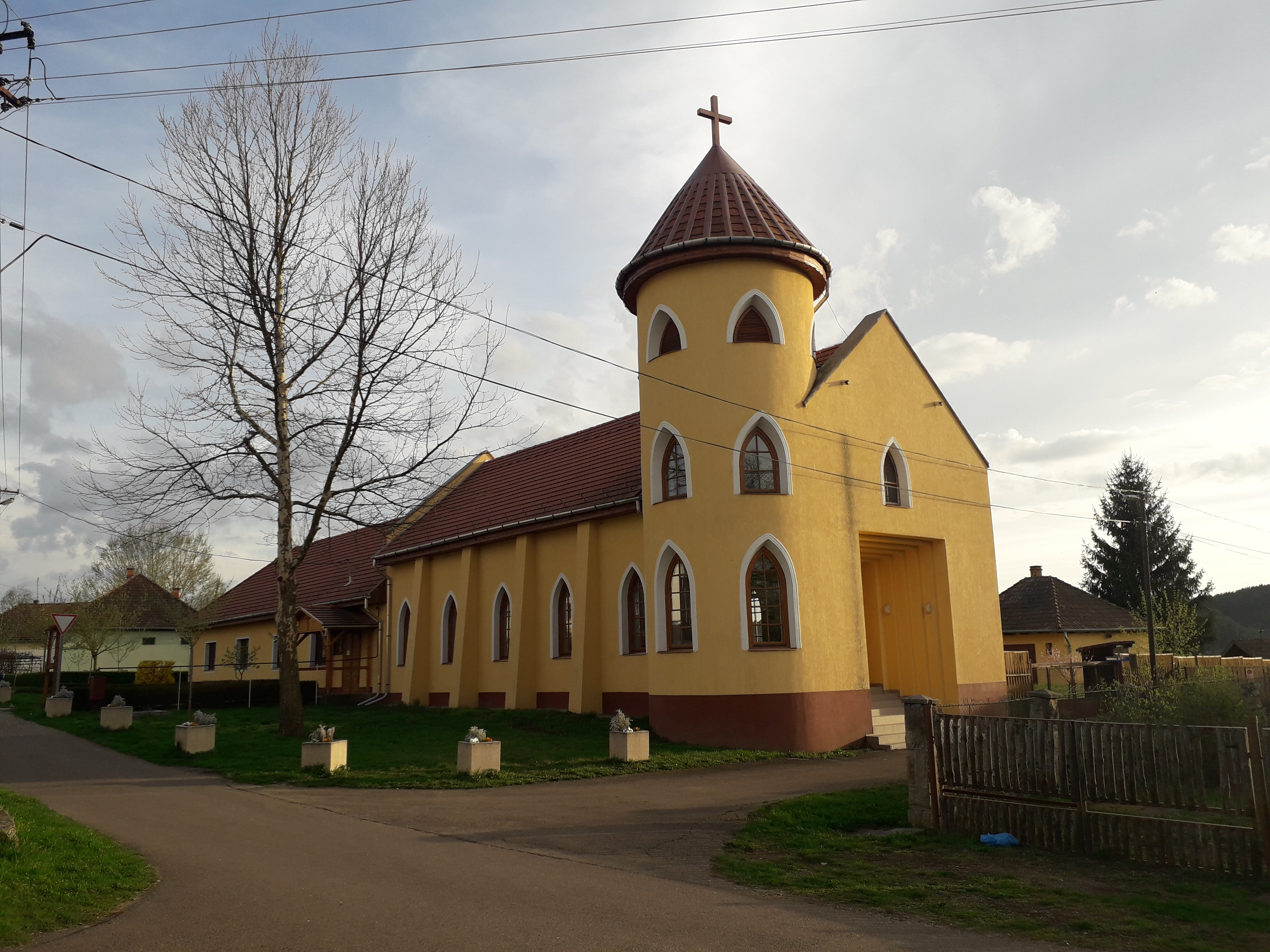

- Coat of arms

- Location of Heves County in Hungary

- Location in Hungary
- Coordinates: 47°58′01″N 20°09′00″E
- Country: Hungary
- Region: Northern Hungary
- County: Heves County
- District: Pétervására

Government
  - Mayor: Zvaráné Béres Mária (Ind.)

Area
  - Total: 2.2 km^{2} (0.85 sq mi)

Population (2015)
  - Total: 212
  - Density: 96/km^{2} (250/sq mi)
- Time zone: UTC+1 (CET)
  - Summer (DST): UTC+2 (CEST)
- Postal code: 3334
- Area code: 36
- Website: http://www.terpes.hu/

Terpes is a village in Heves County, Hungary.
