= Mátra =

Mountain range in Hungary

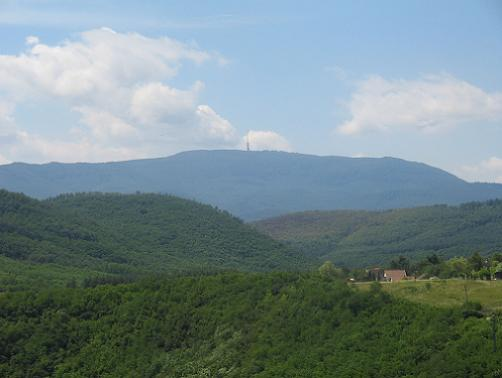
- View of the mountain from Mátraderecske

Highest point
- Peak: Kékes
- Elevation: 1,014 m (3,327 ft)

Geography
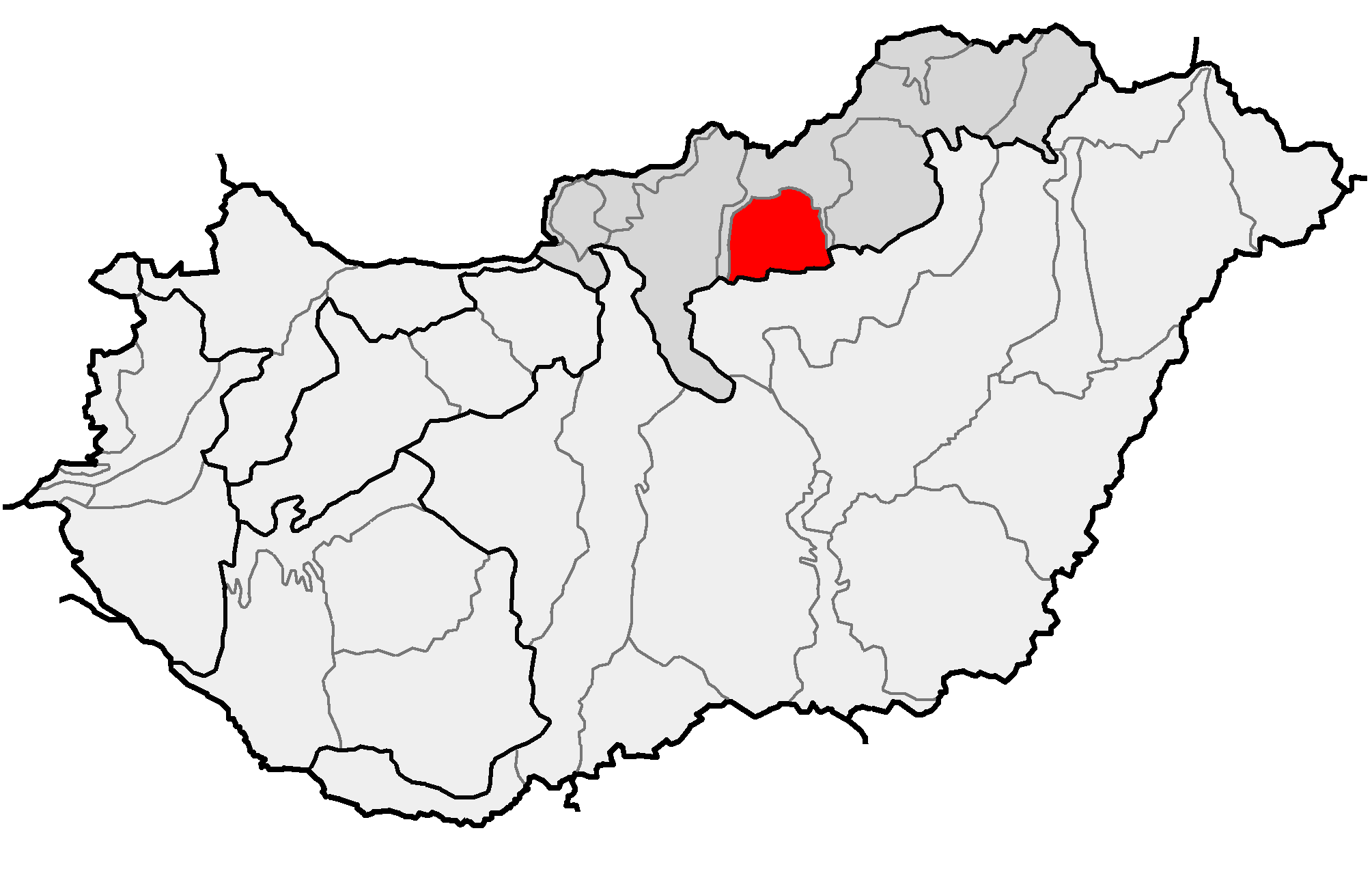
- Location of Mátra (red) within physical subdivisions of Hungary
- Country: Hungary
- Range coordinates: 47°52′N 20°00′E
- Parent range: North Hungarian Mountains, Western Carpathians

Geology
- Rock type: Volcanic

Location in Europe

The Mátra [ˈmaːtrɒ] (Slovak: Matra) is a mountain range in northern Hungary, between the towns Gyöngyös and Eger. The country's highest peak, Kékestető (1014 m), belongs to this mountain range.

== Formation ==
=== Pre-volcanic formations ===
The formation of the Mátra is closely related to the formation of the North Hungarian Mountains and the Carpathians. Formations formed before the volcanism in the Miocene, are located primarily on the steep northern side of the Mátra. The reason for this is, that after the volcanism, the entire mountain range tilted southward due to the subsidence of the trench extending south of the Mátra and Bükk. The southern, more gentle part was buried by young sediments, while on the northern side steep slopes were formed by landslides during the Pleistocene.

The crystalline basement of the mountain range occurs as inclusions in volcanic rocks. Excluding these, the oldest formations are located along the fault system called the Darnó line, which runs northeast-southwest through the Eastern Mátra. The name of the throw is given by the Darnó Hill rising between Recsk and Sirok, where Triassic limestone, radiolarite and shale, as well as Middle Pedimentary basalt pillow lavas, and in some places Oedic (Permian) limestone blocks are found.

In many places at the northern foot of the Mátra, Eocene volcanic and carbonate layers are deposited on the Mesozoic formations; most of them are known from drilling, but they also surface north of the Eastern Mátra. These rocks can be linked to the Periadriatic volcanism, which took place in the southern foreland of the Alps. They were brought to their present location by horizontal tectonic movements, so they have nothing to do with the real Mátra volcanism. This period is also represented by the igneous intrusion (intrusion rock body), to which the Recsk skarn ore formation is also related.

The characteristic sediments of the Oligocene age (Buda marl, Tard clay, Kiscell clay) cover the foot of the Mátra in places several hundred meters thick. Their layers are the source rocks of spring waters rich in carbon dioxide and hydrogen sulfide – the csevices. In some places, tuff and tuffite layers are deposited in the Kiscell clay, but these could not be the products of the Mátra volcano, but of a more distant volcano. Above the Kiscell clay, glauconitic sandstone, Parád schlieren and conglomerate layers dating from the beginning of the Miocene can be found; the latter is the bed of Miocene volcanic rocks in most places.

=== Miocene volcanism ===
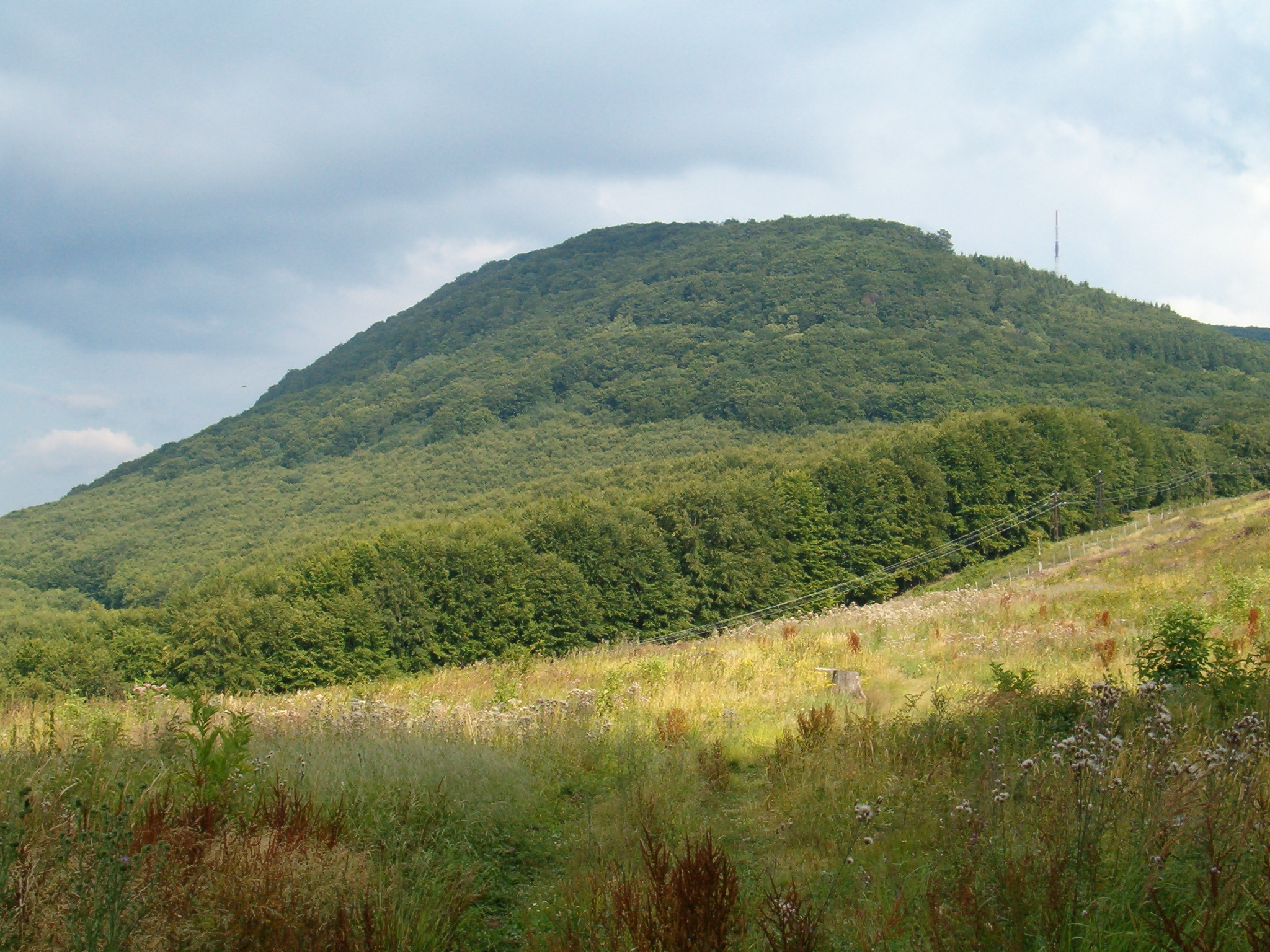
The steep-sided massif of Sombokor northwest of Kékes

The main mass of the Mátra is formed by a several hundred-meter-thick layered volcanic rock mass consisting of an alternation of Middle Miocene (Badenian) pyroxeneandesite, andesitetuff and volcanic agglomerate. The driving force of the volcanic activity was the juxtaposition of the two rock plates that make up the Carpathian Basin region, the Alcapa and the Tisza-Dacia. The migration of the cohesive, rotating tectonic plates was not accompanied by subduction (subduction) but by expansion processes: during these periods, the calcium-rich magma could reach the surface. The inner-Carpathian calc-alkaline volcanism, which began about 21 million years ago, in the first part of the Miocene, lasted until the Pleistocene. The Mátra formed 13-18 million years ago as part of a series of events that are also significant in the geological history of our European continent.

The explosive, "acidic" volcanism rocks known as the introductory stage of Miocene volcanism are also found here. Of the pyroclastics classified under the collective name of lower, middle and upper rhyolite tuff, the middle one was identified in the Mátra. Its local variant was called Tar dacitetuff due to its relatively lower silicon content, the exact age of which is unknown; its formation time may be between 15-18 million years. It occurs as ignimbrite deposited partly on land and partly under water up to an altitude of 500-600 meters in both the western and eastern parts. Since it is also found in relatively higher areas, it is certain that it played a fundamental role in the formation of the structure of the mountain range. The most likely scenario is that it was a series of violent and prolonged eruptions that ended with a caldera rupture. Another possibility is that the tilting of the Mátra towards the south caused the prominent geographical position of the tuff rock massif.

The andesite lava blanket, which also determines the present-day landforms of the Mátra, was formed at about the same time as the formation of the Tar dacitetuff or 1-2 million years later, during the Miocene intermediate volcanism. The formation of andesite, i.e. magma with a medium SiO_{2}-content, can be linked to plate subduction; the high volatile content of the plate subducting from the surface flows upwards and saturates the mantle part above it. The melting point of the mantle material decreases with the process also called mantle metasomatosis, so magma can form more easily. The melt formed at this time is still basaltic in composition, but by the time it reaches the surface through complicated magma mixing and differentiation (separation) processes, it becomes increasingly andesitic in nature. Andesitic lava – compared to rhyolite-dacite – is less violent, and instead of explosive, it comes to light during effusive eruptions, which do not involve caldera formation. In such cases – as in the case of Mátra – large-area lava sheets are more typical.

With the end of andesite volcanism, diatomaceous earth (diatomite) and then limestone were deposited in the basin between Gyöngyöspata and Szurdokpüspöki, and at the end of the Miocene volcanism, some smaller rhyolite volcanoes were still active on the southern edge of the mountain range (one of the remains is the swelling cone of Kis-hegy at Gyöngyössolymos).

== Geography ==
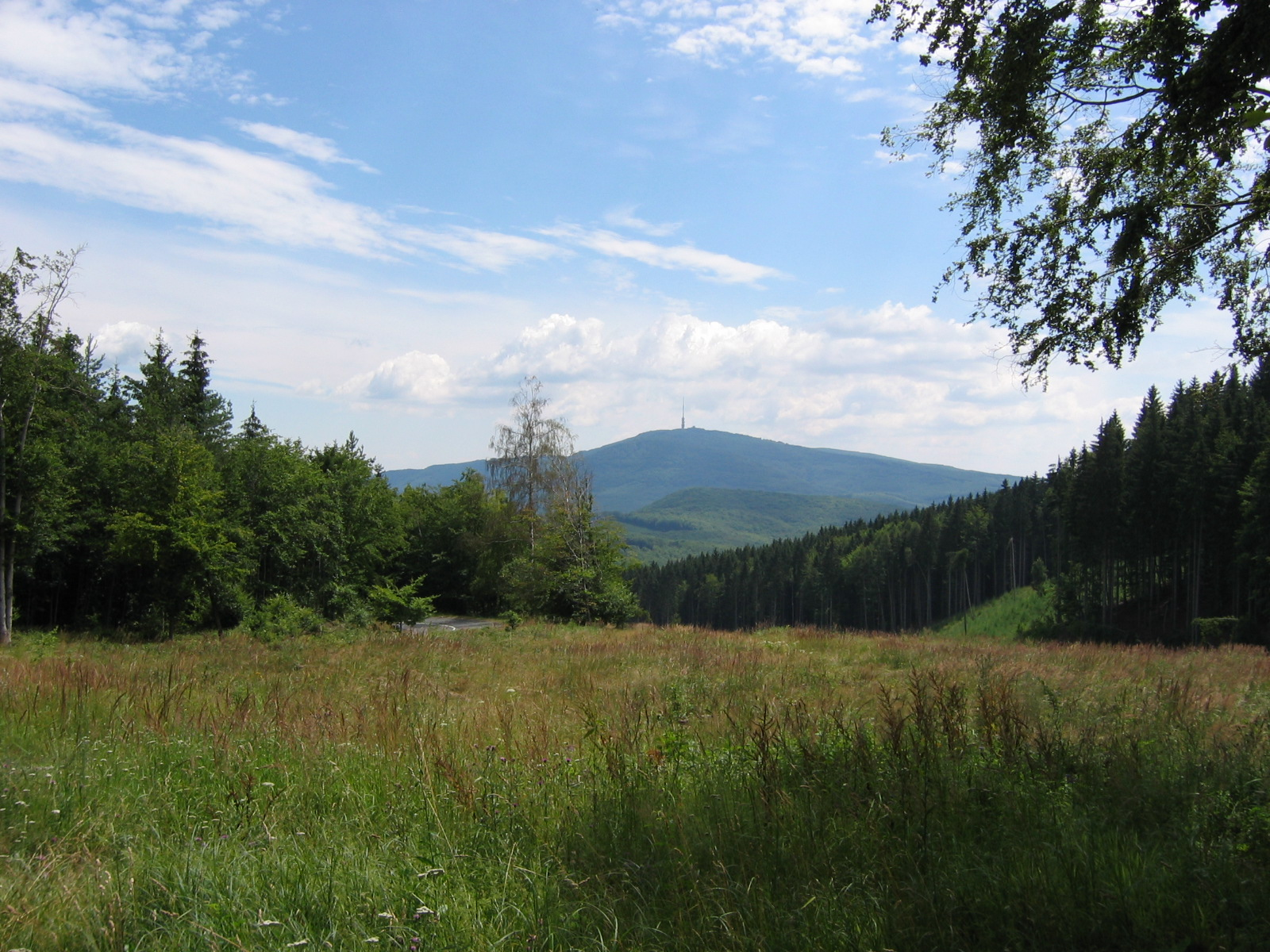
Kékestető (1014 m)

The Mátra is part of the North Hungarian Mountains and belongs by origin to the largest young volcanic zone of Europe. It is situated between the valleys of the River Tarna and River Zagyva. The Mátra divided into the Western Mátra, Central Mátra and the Eastern Mátra. The highest point of the Western Mátra is Muzsla (805 m). The Central Mátra consists of the plateau of Mátrabérc (Mátra Ridge) and the groups of the volcanic cones of Galya-tető (964 m) and Kékes (1014 m). Steep, rugged slopes, screes, talus slopes and slides alternate with one another, covered with closed beech forests. Gentler slopes and parallel valleys flow down to the south, the largest of which is the so-called Nagy-völgy ("Great valley"). The 'main entrance' to the Mátra was formed in parallel with the valley of Nagy-patak ("Great stream"), ranging from Mátrafüred to Mátraháza. From the vineyard-covered landscape of the foot of the Mátra travellers can arrive at the wooded mountains in a flash. To the east, after the steep escarpment of the 898-meter-high Sas-kő ("Eagle stone"), the 650–750-meter-high peaks of the Eastern Mátra follow one another. The northern part of the mountain range is called Mátralába ("the Mátra's feet"). This is a hilly area covered with 250–400-meter-high small volcanic cones, with mostly cultivated arable lands.

== Regional structure ==
=== Cities/towns ===
- Gyöngyös (including Mátrafüred, Mátraháza and Kékestető)
- Pásztó (including Hasznos and Mátrakeresztes)
- Pétervására
- Bátonyterenye (including Nagybátony, Kisterenye, Maconka, Szúpatak and Szorospatak)

== Gallery ==
Kékes Forest Reserve – one of the remaining primary forests of Europe

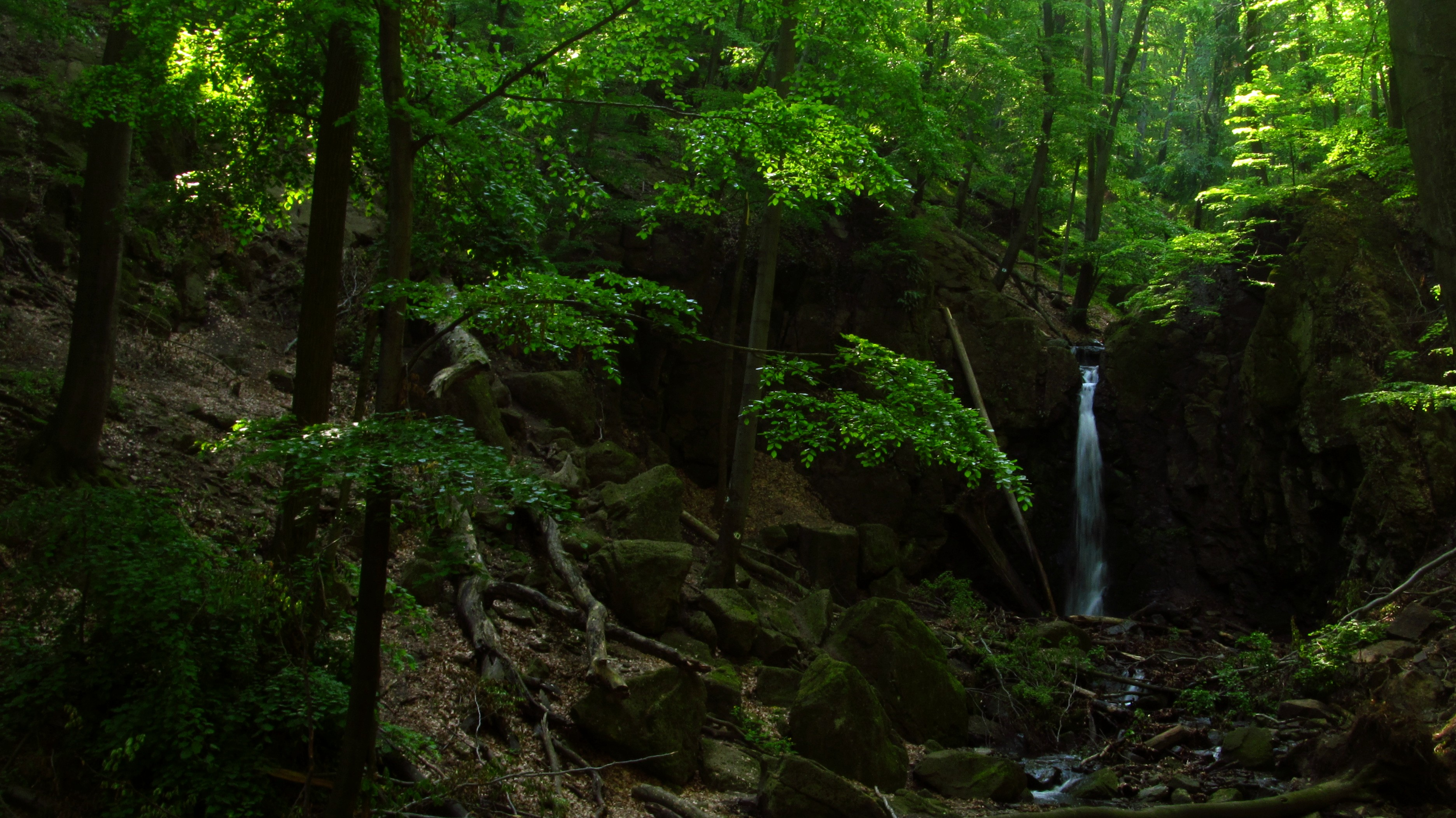
Ilona Valley Waterfall near to Parád – the highest waterfall of Hungary dropping approximately 10 meters

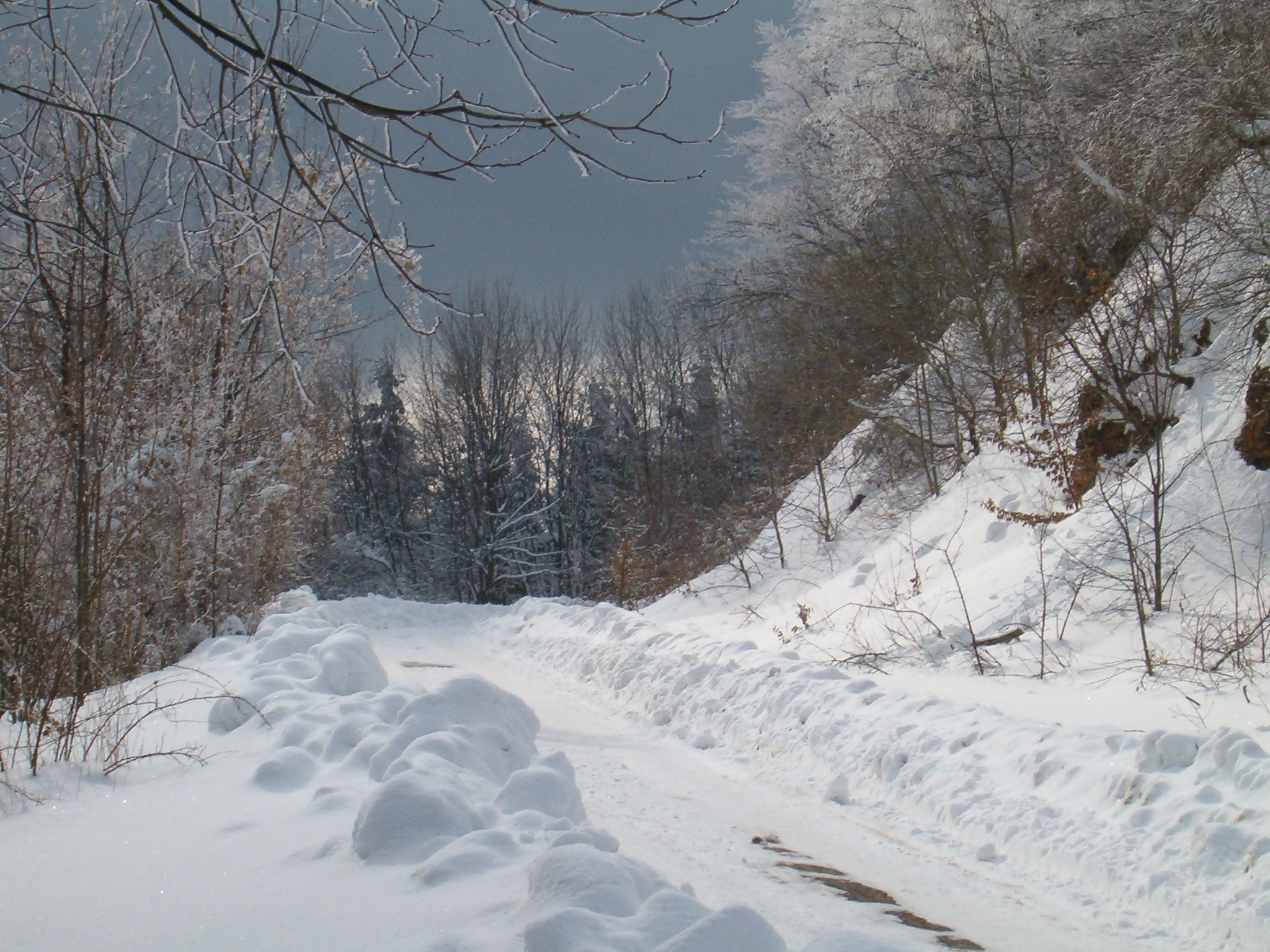
Winter landscape in Mátra

== See also ==
- Geography of Hungary
- 1513 Mátra
