= Szajla =

- Village (község)
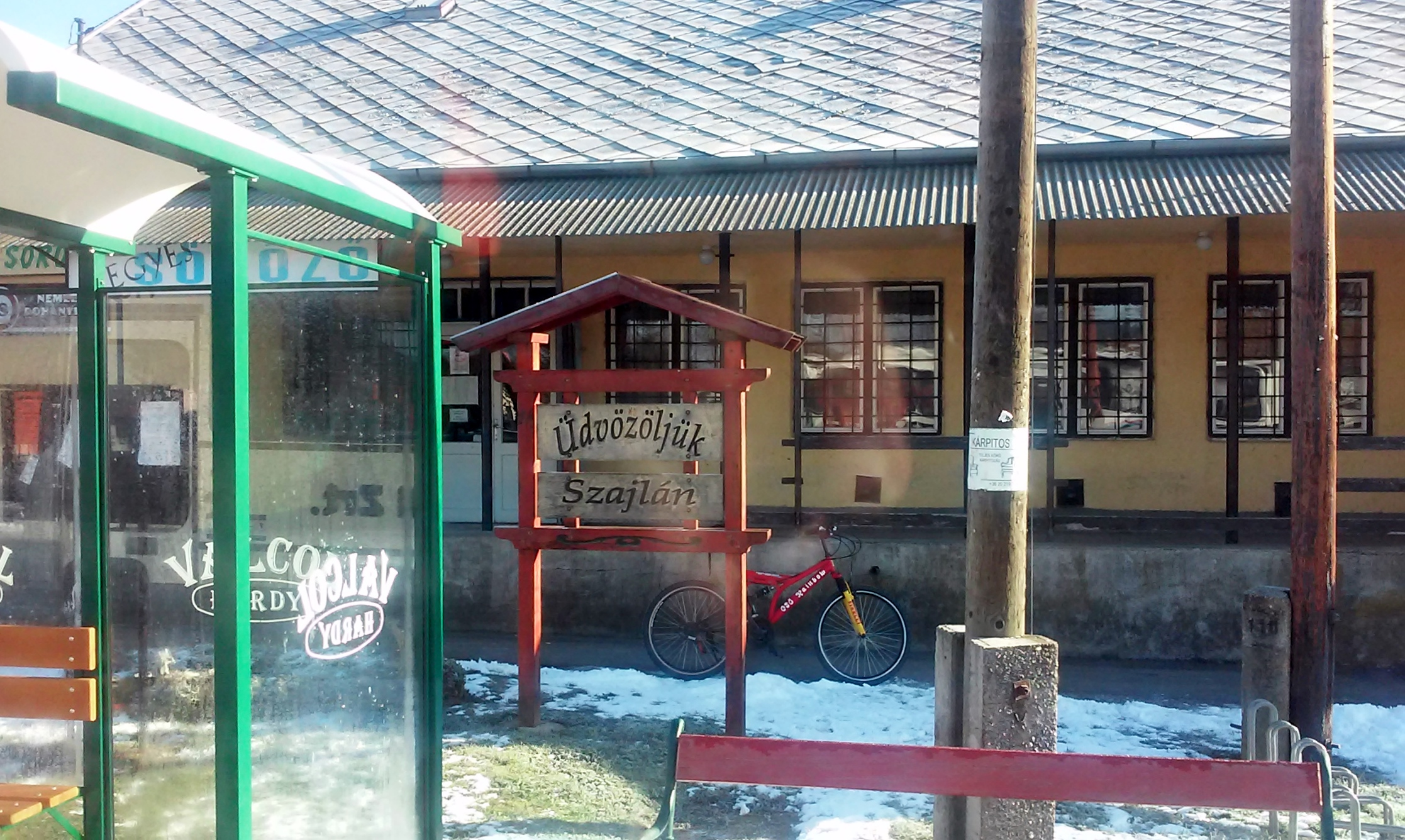

- Coat of arms

- Location of Heves County in Hungary

- Location in Hungary
- Coordinates: 47°57′43″N 20°08′31″E
- Country: Hungary
- Region: Northern Hungary
- County: Heves County
- District: Pétervására

Government
  - Mayor: Vincze Imre Istvánné (Ind.)

Area
  - Total: 8.7 km^{2} (3.4 sq mi)

Population (2015)
  - Total: 548
  - Density: 63/km^{2} (160/sq mi)
- Time zone: UTC+1 (CET)
  - Summer (DST): UTC+2 (CEST)
- Postal code: 3334
- Area code: 36
- Website: https://www.szajla.hu/

Szajla is a village in Heves County, Hungary.
