= László Horváth (Hungarian politician) =

Hungarian politician

Member of the National Assembly
- Incumbent
- Assumed office 14 May 2010
- In office 18 June 1998 – 15 May 2006
- In office 27 November 1990 – 27 June 1994

Personal details
- Born: 24 April 1962 (age 64) Esztergom, Hungary
- Party: Fidesz (since 1992)
- Other political affiliations: SZDSZ (1989–1992)
- Spouse: Ágnes Horváthné Lőrincz
- Children: Dávid
- Profession: politician

László Horváth (born April 24, 1962) is a Hungarian politician, member of the National Assembly (MP) for Pétervására then Gyöngyös (Heves County Constituency II). Formerly he also served as Member of Parliament (1990–1994; 1998–2006).

== Personal life ==
He is married. His wife is Ágnes Horváthné Lőrincz. They have a son together, Dávid.
