= Mátraderecske =

- Village
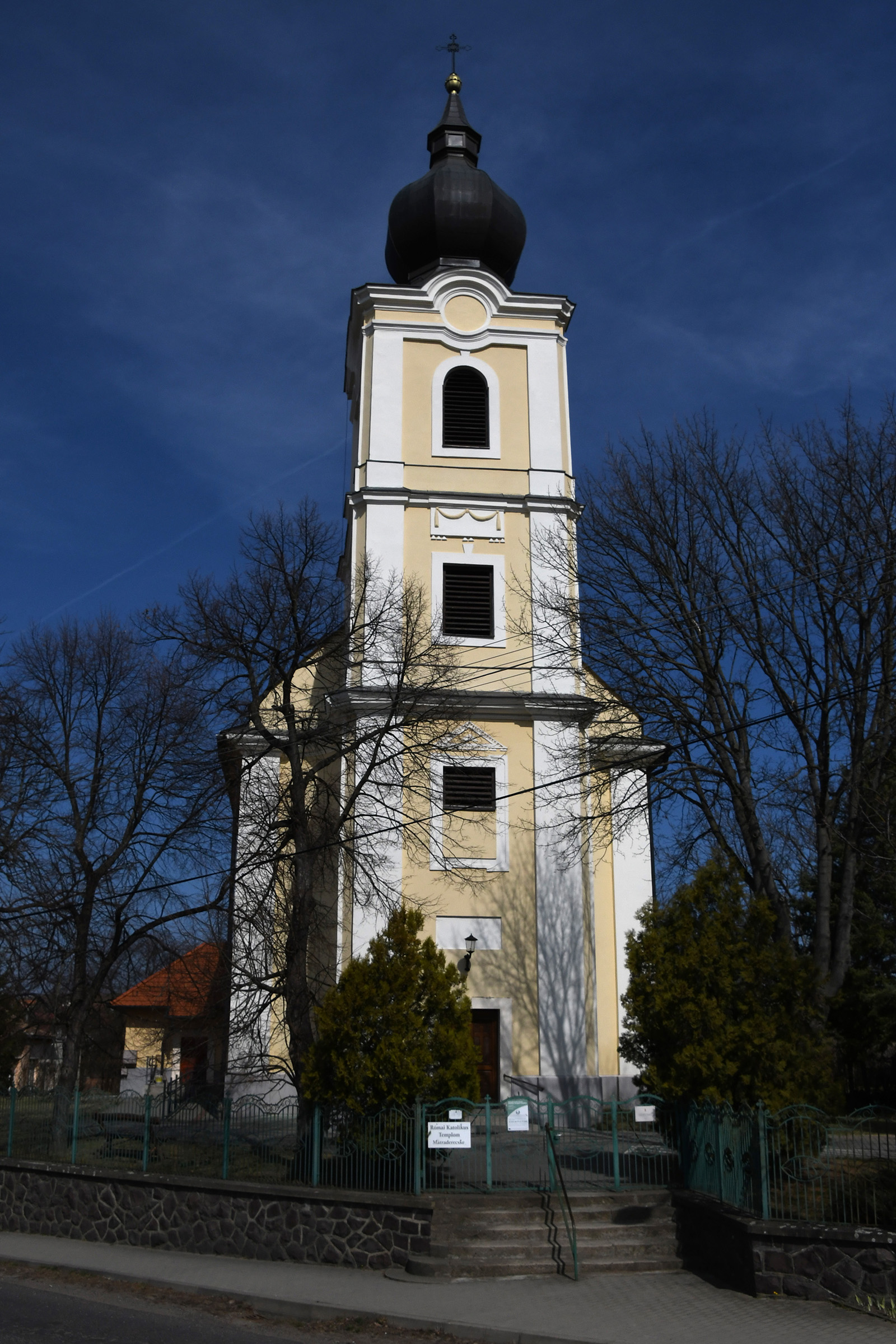
- Our Lady of Sorrows church

- Coat of arms

- Location in Hungary
- Coordinates: 47°56′59″N 20°05′01″E
- Country: Hungary
- County: Heves
- District: Pétervására
- First mentioned: 1337

Government
  - Mayor: Gábor Forgó (Fidesz–KDNP)

Area
  - Total: 13.99 km^{2} (5.40 sq mi)

Population (2022)
  - Total: 1,750
  - Density: 125/km^{2} (324/sq mi)
- Time zone: UTC+1 (CET)
  - Summer (DST): UTC+2 (CEST)
- Postal code: 3246
- Area code: 36
- Website: www.matraderecske.hu

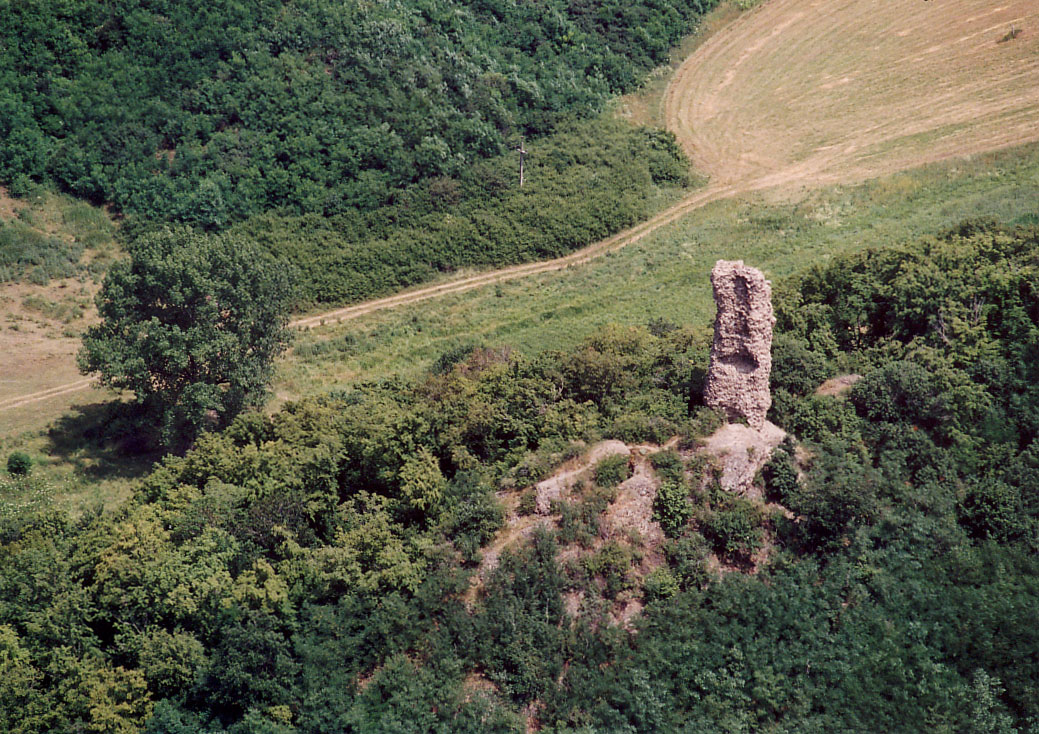
Kanázsvár

Mátraderecske is a village in Heves County, Hungary, under the Mátra mountain range, beside of the Balla creek. As of 2022 census, it has a population of 1750 (see Demographics). The village located beside of the (Nr. 84) Kisterenye–Kál-Kápolna railway line, 25.2 km from the main road 21 and 34.4 km from the M25 expressway. Although the settlement has its own railway stop, public transport on the railway line ceased on 3 March 2007. The closest train station with public transport is in Bátonyterenye 25.3 km away.

== History ==
The name of the settlement appears in the 1332-37 papal tithe list as De Recske and then in a 1479 document. The settlement's castle, Kanázsvár, was built in the 14th century and named after its first castle captain, István Kanázs. In the 16th century, it was owned by Péter Perényi, then by Kristóf Országh. Due to the Ottoman campaigns, the village was depopulated in 1552 and 1683, and was populated again after 1576 and 1689. The castle was surrendered without a fight in 1552, even though it had previously been fortified and connected to the Recsk castle with a 500 m tunnel so that the population could escape to the castle. The castle consisted of a watchtower and a stone fence surrounding it. Its military importance was given by the steep mountainside. Today, only the wall remains of the watchtower can be seen. The first church in the village was destroyed by a fire, the second by the Turks. The village possessed by Count Michael Friedrich von Althann and the Aspremont counts from 1701, Count Antal Grassalkovich from 1740, Count György Károlyi buys half of the village in 1847, the other half remains in the possession of commoners. A population study took place in Mátraderecske, as it is one of the most typical ethnic settlements in Palócland. The inhabitants of the village are peasants, who can only be recognized by their dialect.
The today church was built in 1804 and consecrated in honor of the Our Lady of Sorrows. Clay mining and brick burning started at the end of the 19th century. The village's brick factory still operates by the Leier-Hungária Ltd.. Miklós Bell, the founder of the brick factory, also built the settlement's first school. During the research wells conducted in 1965, hot water of 38°C broke out from a depth of 800 meters to a height of 15 meters. The thermal medicinal water is mainly suitable for the treatment of rheumatic diseases. Nearly 300 resorts were built around the spa. In the northern part of the settlement, the high concentration of carbon dioxide that flows naturally began to be subjected to scientific tests in 1992. The gas source was classified in 1999 as a "medicinal gas" by the National General Directorate of Health Resorts and Spas. A mofetta spa was created in 2006, what is unique in Hungary, which is suitable for the treatment of vascular diseases and rheumatic complaints. In the course of archaeological research in 1970, mammoth finds were found, which can be seen today in the Mátra Museum in Gyöngyös. In this village birth in 1924 Lajos Faluvégi, who were the financial minister between 1971 and 1980. Despite Mátraderecske is only a village, it made sister city type agreements with other settlements: Nagyharsány, Derecske, Gyergyószárhegy in Romania and Nyékvárkony in Slovakia.

== Demographics ==
According the 2022 census, 91.7% of the population were of Hungarian ethnicity, 9.7% were Gypsies, 0.9% were Ukrainians and 7.9% were did not wish to answer. The religious distribution was as follows: 59.2% Roman Catholic, 3.3% Calvinist, 0.7% Greek Catholic, 10.3% non-denominational, and 23.9% did not wish to answer. The Gypsies have a local nationality government. No population in farms. Two other inhabited outskirts are connect to the village the Háromhányás and the Recreation area to 1.0 and 1.5 km with 5 and 12 inhabitants.

Population by years:

Year	1870	1880	1890	1900	1910	1920	1930	1941
Population	1159	1091	1413	1555	1588	1775	2119	2300
Year	1949	1960	1970	1980	1990	2001	2011	2022
Population	2270	2587	2663	2638	2545	2321	2035	1750

== Politics ==
Mayors since 1990:

- 1990–2010: Ferenc Zám (independent)
- 2010–: Gábor Forgó (Fidesz–KDNP)
