= List of populated places in Hungary (Gy) =

This is a list of cities, towns and villages of Hungary

KEY: T = Town ; V = Village

| Name | Rank | County | District | Population | Post code |
|---|---|---|---|---|---|
| Gyál | T | Pest | Gyáli | 21,397 | 2360 |
| Gyalóka | V | Győr-Moson-Sopron | Sopron–Fertődi | 72 | 9474 |
| Gyanógeregye | V | Vas | Szombathelyi | 148 | 9774 |
| Gyarmat | V | Győr-Moson-Sopron | Téti | 1,290 | 9126 |
| Gyékényes | V | Somogy | Csurgói | 1,085 | 8851 |
| Gyenesdiás | V | Zala | Keszthely–Hévízi | 2,934 | 8315 |
| Gyepükaján | V | Veszprém | Sümegi | 359 | 8473 |
| Gyermely | V | Komárom-Esztergom | Tatabányai | 1,273 | 2821 |
| Gyód | V | Baranya | Pécsi | 618 | 7668 |
| Gyomaendrőd | T | Békés | Békési | 15,344 | 5500 |
| Gyóró | V | Győr-Moson-Sopron | Kapuvári | 442 | 9363 |
| Gyömöre | V | Győr-Moson-Sopron | Téti | 1,370 | 9124 |
| Gyömrő | T | Pest | Monori | 13,904 | 2230 |
| Gyöngyfa | V | Baranya | Szentlőrinci | 153 | 7954 |
| Gyöngyös | T | Heves | Gyöngyösi | 5,531 | 3200 |
| Gyöngyösfalu | V | Vas | Koszegi | 1,095 | 9723 |
| Gyöngyöshalász | V | Heves | Gyöngyösi | 2,714 | 3212 |
| Gyöngyösmellék | V | Baranya | Szigetvári | 331 | 7972 |
| Gyöngyösoroszi | V | Heves | Gyöngyösi | 2,139 | 3211 |
| Gyöngyöspata | V | Heves | Gyöngyösi | 6,075 | 3035 |
| Gyöngyössolymos | V | Heves | Gyöngyösi | 6,485 | 3231 |
| Gyöngyöstarján | V | Heves | Gyöngyösi | 4,639 | 3036 |
| Gyönk | V | Tolna | Tamási | 2,179 | 7064 |
| Győr | county seat | Győr-Moson-Sopron | Győri | 128,913 | 9000^{*} |
| Győrasszonyfa | V | Győr-Moson-Sopron | Pannonhalmi | 504 | 9093 |
| Györe | V | Tolna | Bonyhádi | 769 | 7352 |
| Györgytarló | V | Borsod-Abaúj-Zemplén | Sárospataki | 604 | 3954 |
| Györköny | V | Tolna | Paksi | 944 | 7045 |
| Győrladamér | V | Győr-Moson-Sopron | Győri | 1,282 | 9173 |
| Győröcske | V | Szabolcs-Szatmár-Bereg | Kisvárdai | 124 | 4625 |
| Győrság | V | Győr-Moson-Sopron | Pannonhalmi | 1,489 | 9084 |
| Győrsövényház | V | Győr-Moson-Sopron | Csornai | 802 | 9161 |
| Győrszemere | V | Győr-Moson-Sopron | Téti | 3,014 | 9121 |
| Győrtelek | V | Szabolcs-Szatmár-Bereg | Mátészalkai | 1,739 | 4752 |
| Győrújbarát | V | Győr-Moson-Sopron | Győri | 4,832 | 9081 |
| Győrújfalu | V | Győr-Moson-Sopron | Győri | 1,160 | 9171 |
| Győrvár | V | Vas | Vasvári | 714 | 9821 |
| Győrzámoly | V | Győr-Moson-Sopron | Győri | 1,658 | 9172 |
| Gyugy | V | Somogy | Lengyeltóti | 260 | 8692 |
| Gyula | T | Békés | Gyulai | 32,640 | 5700 |
| Gyulaháza | V | Szabolcs-Szatmár-Bereg | Kisvárdai | 2,082 | 4545 |
| Gyulaj | V | Tolna | Dombóvári | 1,110 | 7227 |
| Gyulakeszi | V | Veszprém | Tapolcai | 727 | 8286 |
| Gyúró | V | Fejér | Ercsi | 1,240 | 2464 |
| Gyügye | V | Szabolcs-Szatmár-Bereg | Fehérgyarmati | 271 | 4733 |
| Gyüre | V | Szabolcs-Szatmár-Bereg | Vásárosnaményi | 1,268 | 4813 |
| Gyurus | V | Zala | Zalaegerszegi | 102 | 8932 |

== Notes ==
- Cities marked with * have several different post codes, the one here is only the most general one.
