= Vécs =

- Village
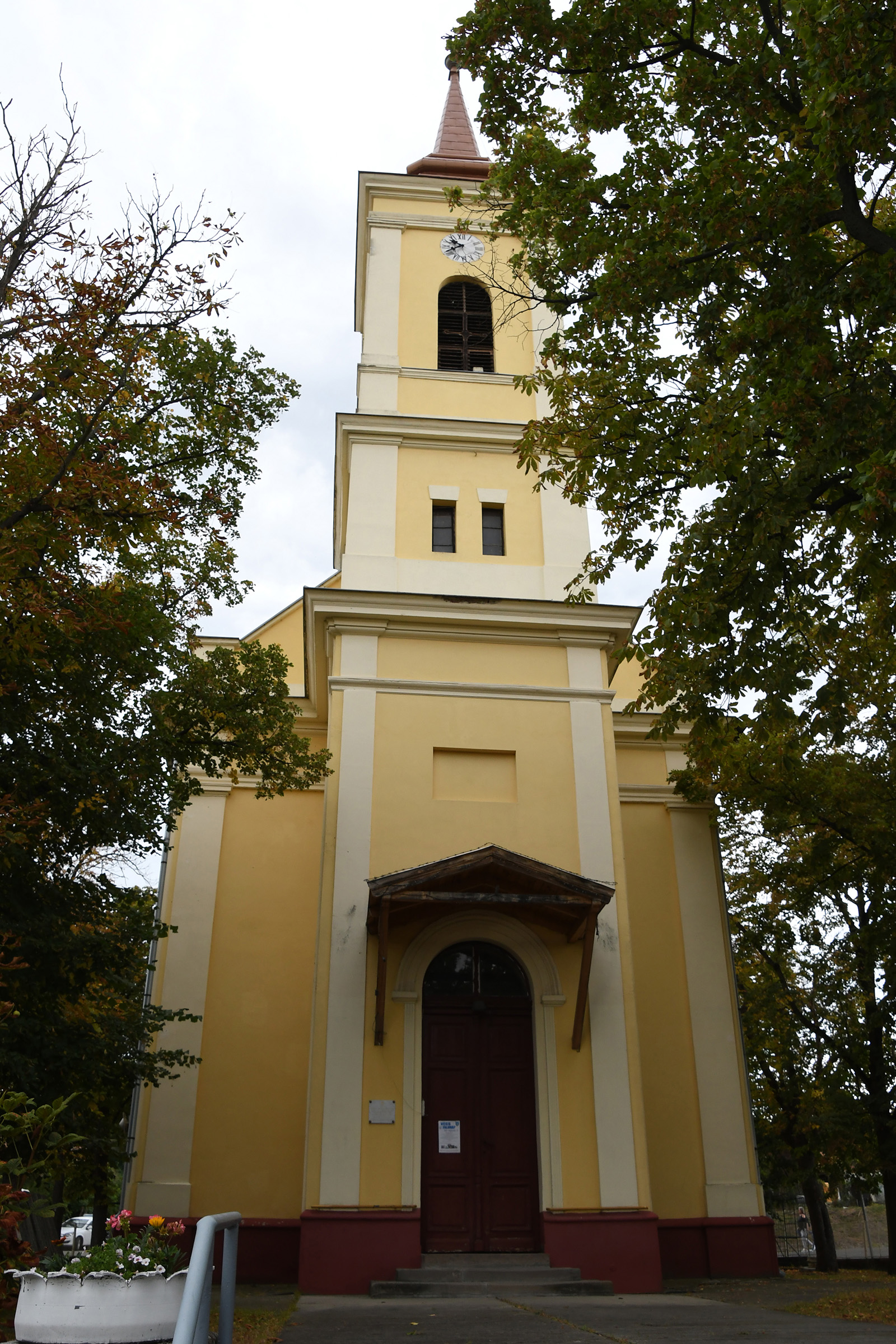
- Saint Anna church

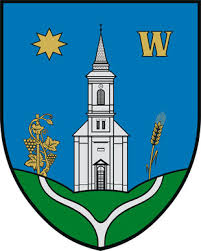
- Coat of arms

- Location in Hungary
- Coordinates: 47°48′29″N 20°10′08″E
- Country: Hungary
- County: Heves
- District: Gyöngyös
- First mentioned: 1337

Government
  - Mayor: István Gellén (Ind.)

Area
  - Total: 25.66 km^{2} (9.91 sq mi)

Population (2022)
  - Total: 608
  - Density: 23.7/km^{2} (61.4/sq mi)
- Time zone: UTC+1 (CET)
  - Summer (DST): UTC+2 (CEST)
- Postal code: 3265
- Area code: 37
- Website: www.vecs.hu

Vécs is a village in Heves County, Hungary, beside of the Tarnóca creek. As of 2022 census, it has a population of 608 (see Demographics). The village located 5,2 km far from the (Nr. 84) Kisterenye–Kál-Kápolna railway line and 11,7 km far from the main road 3 and 16,3 km far from the M3 motorway. Although the Feldebrő railway stop is the closest, but public transport on the railway line ceased on March 3, 2007. The closest train station with public transport in Ludas 14,5 km far.

== History ==
Memories from the Neolithic and the Bronze Age confirm the early appearance of humans. The name of the village first appeared in the papal tithe list of 1332-37 in the form Weck, later documents mention it in the form Wech(e). It was the property of the Vécsi family, and in 1438 it was owned by László Vécsi, the viscount of the county. At the end of the 15th century, due to the infidelity of Gábor Vécsi, King Matthias I confiscated the village and donated it to Urban Nagylucsei the bishop of Eger. It was depopulated during the Ottoman rule. At the end of the 17th century, it belonged to the Kisnána estate, in 1715 it was a curial village, before 1848 it was a lordly village, and after 1871 it was a large village. The main source of livelihood for its inhabitants is wheat, corn, grapes, green fodder and lentils were cultivated. In the 20th century built the Saint Anna church. According to the documents of the National Wine Certification Institute between 1920 and 1960, Hungary's best Welschriesling grapes grown on the Sáfrányosi vineyard in Vécs, which had a temperature of 30-33 M°. István Csordás, an engineer born in Vécs, who was the builder and owner of the Vécs Castle, played a role in the development of the Vécsey grenade designed by Captain Zoltán Vécsey. Before 1950, the village belonged administratively to Gyöngyös, and since then it is an independent village.

== Demographics ==
According the 2022 census, 93.5% of the population were of Hungarian ethnicity, 14.7% were Gypsies, 0,7% were Romanians and 6.2% were did not wish to answer. The religious distribution was as follows: 37.6% Roman Catholic, 5.7% Calvinist, 0.8% Greek Catholic, 6.9% non-denominational, and 45.3% did not wish to answer. The Gypsies have a local nationality government. No population in farms.

Population by years:

Year	1870	1880	1890	1900	1910	1920	1930	1941
Population	1283	1429	1184	1230	1374	1564	1600	1576
Year	1949	1960	1970	1980	1990	2001	2011	2022
Population	1522	1502	1368	1170	883	737	649	608

== Politics ==
Mayors since 1990:

- 1990–1998: István Búzás (independent)
- 1998–2001: Endre Simon (independent)
- 2001–2002: Béla Galgóczy (independent)
- 2002–2006: István Buzás (independent)
- 2006–2019: Mrs. Attila Szlovencsák (independent)
- 2019–: István Gellén (independent)
