= Michinoku Folklore Village =

- みちのく民俗村
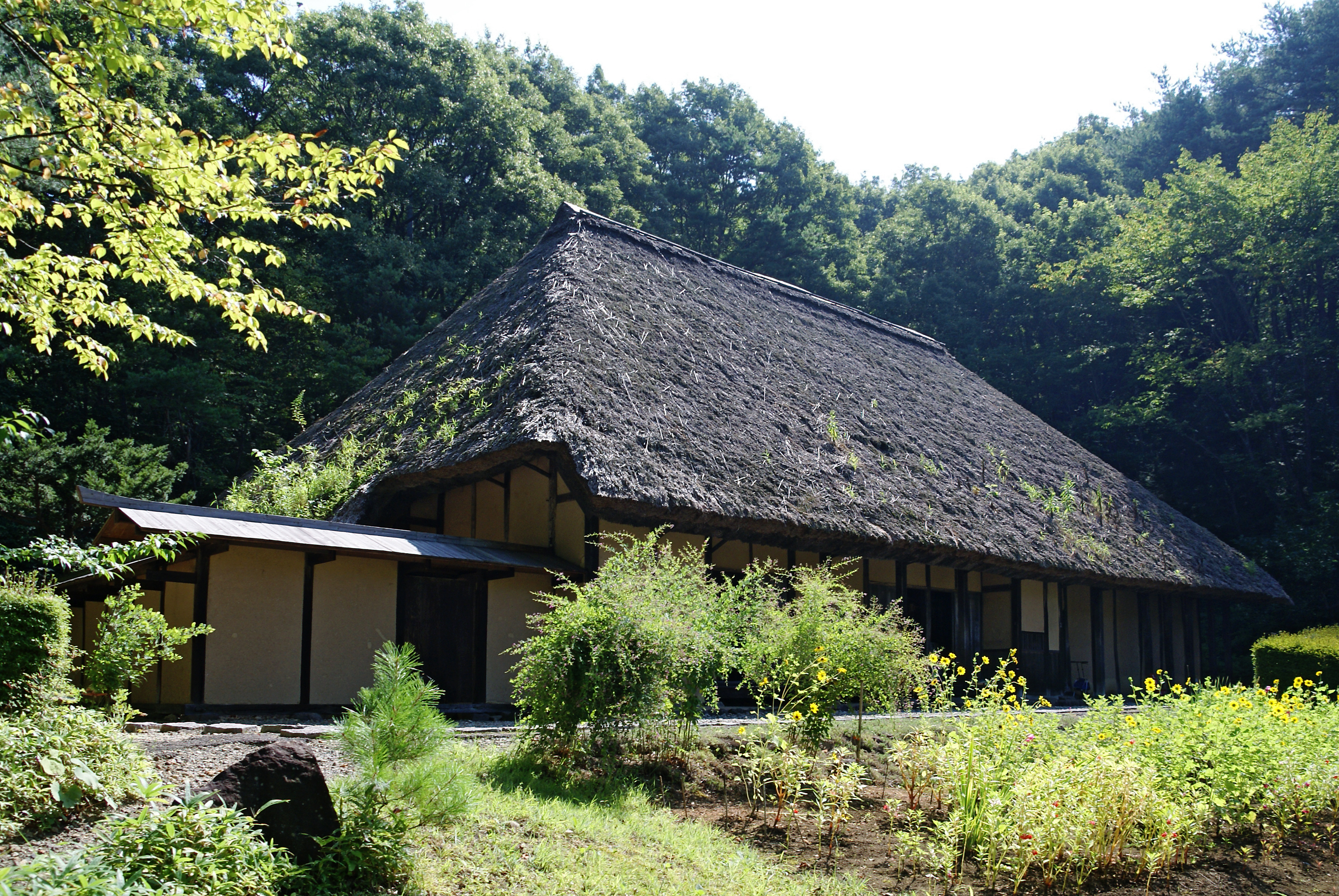
- Former Kanno Family Residence (ICP)

- Location within Japan
- Established: 9 October 1992
- Location: Kitakami, Iwate Prefecture, Japan
- Coordinates: 39°16′13″N 141°07′47″E
- Type: Open-air folk museum
- Website: Official website (ja)

Michinoku Folklore Village (みちのく民俗村, Michinoku Minzoku Mura) is an open-air museum folk museum that opened in Kitakami, Iwate Prefecture, Japan in 1992. The twenty-eight buildings include ten thatched minka, among them the Former Kanno Family Residence, an Important Cultural Property.

== See also ==
- Michinoku
