= Markaz, Hungary =

Markaz
- Village
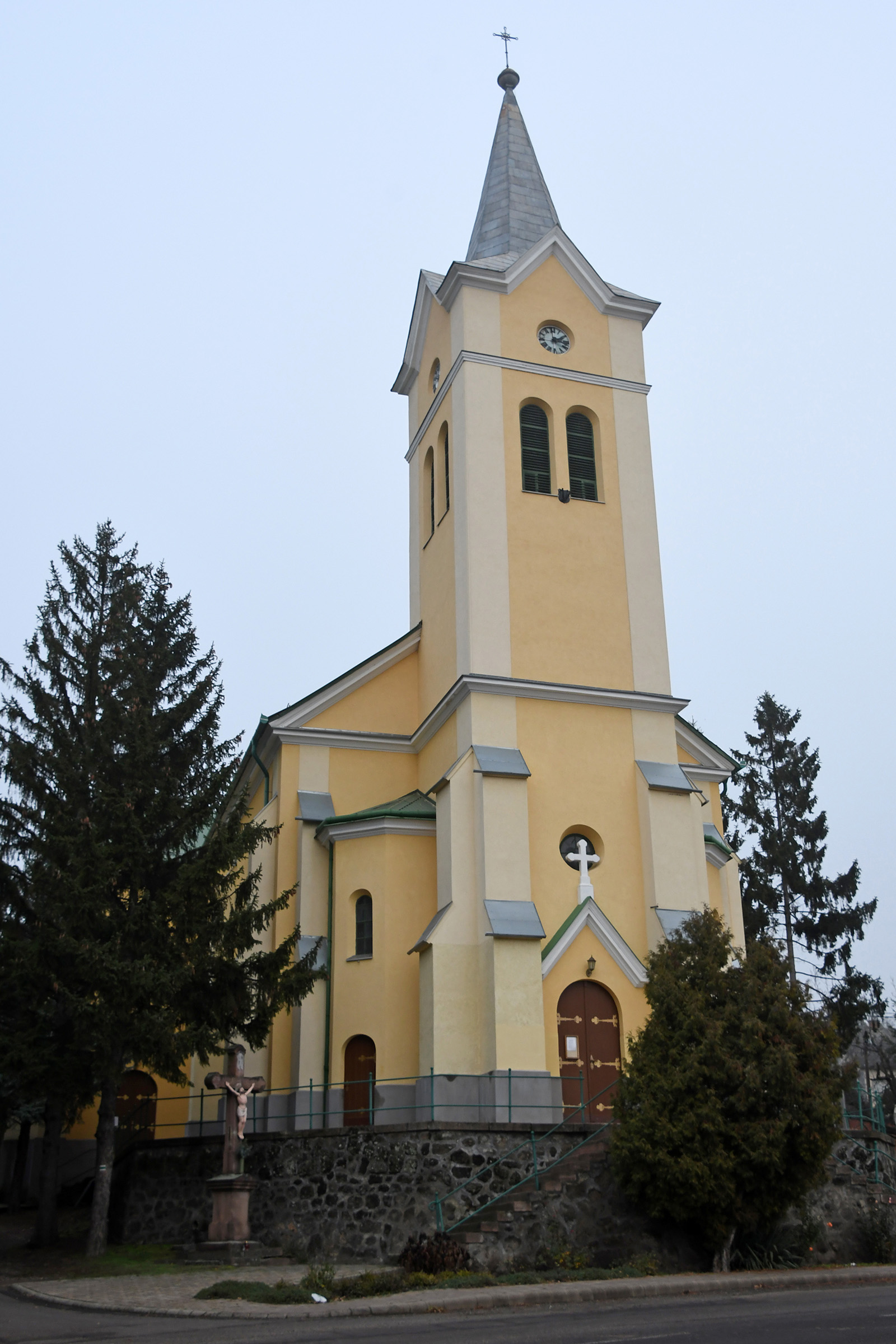
- Immaculate Conception Church

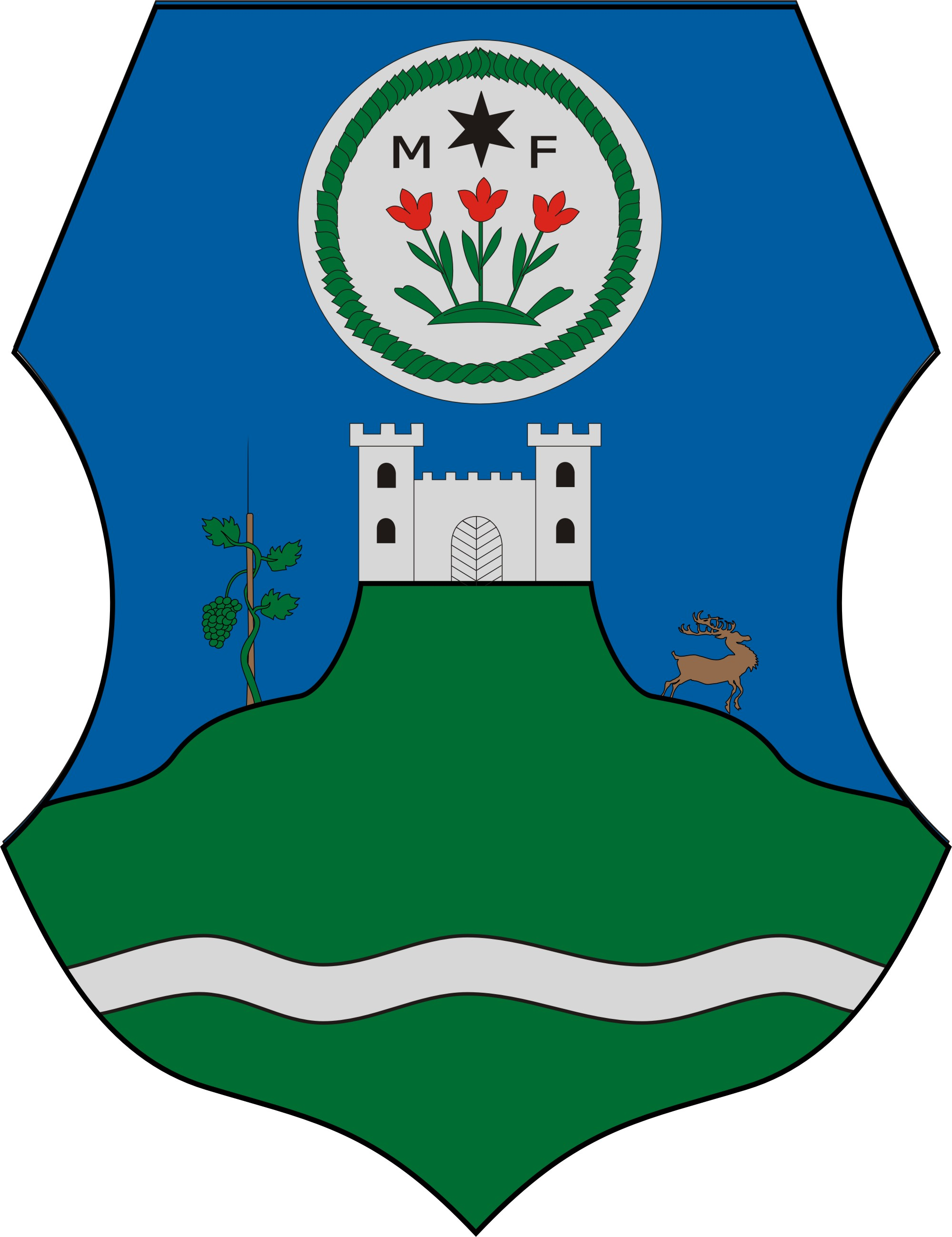
- Coat of arms

- Location in Hungary
- Coordinates: 47°49′26″N 20°03′22″E
- Country: Hungary
- County: Heves
- District: Gyöngyös
- Establishment: 1742
- Founder: Gáspár Bossányi

Government
  - Mayor: László Holló (Ind.)

Area
  - Total: 25.61 km^{2} (9.89 sq mi)

Population (2022)
  - Total: 1,698
  - Density: 66.30/km^{2} (171.7/sq mi)
- Time zone: UTC+1 (CET)
  - Summer (DST): UTC+2 (CEST)
- Postal code: 3262
- Area code: 37
- Website: www.markaz.hu

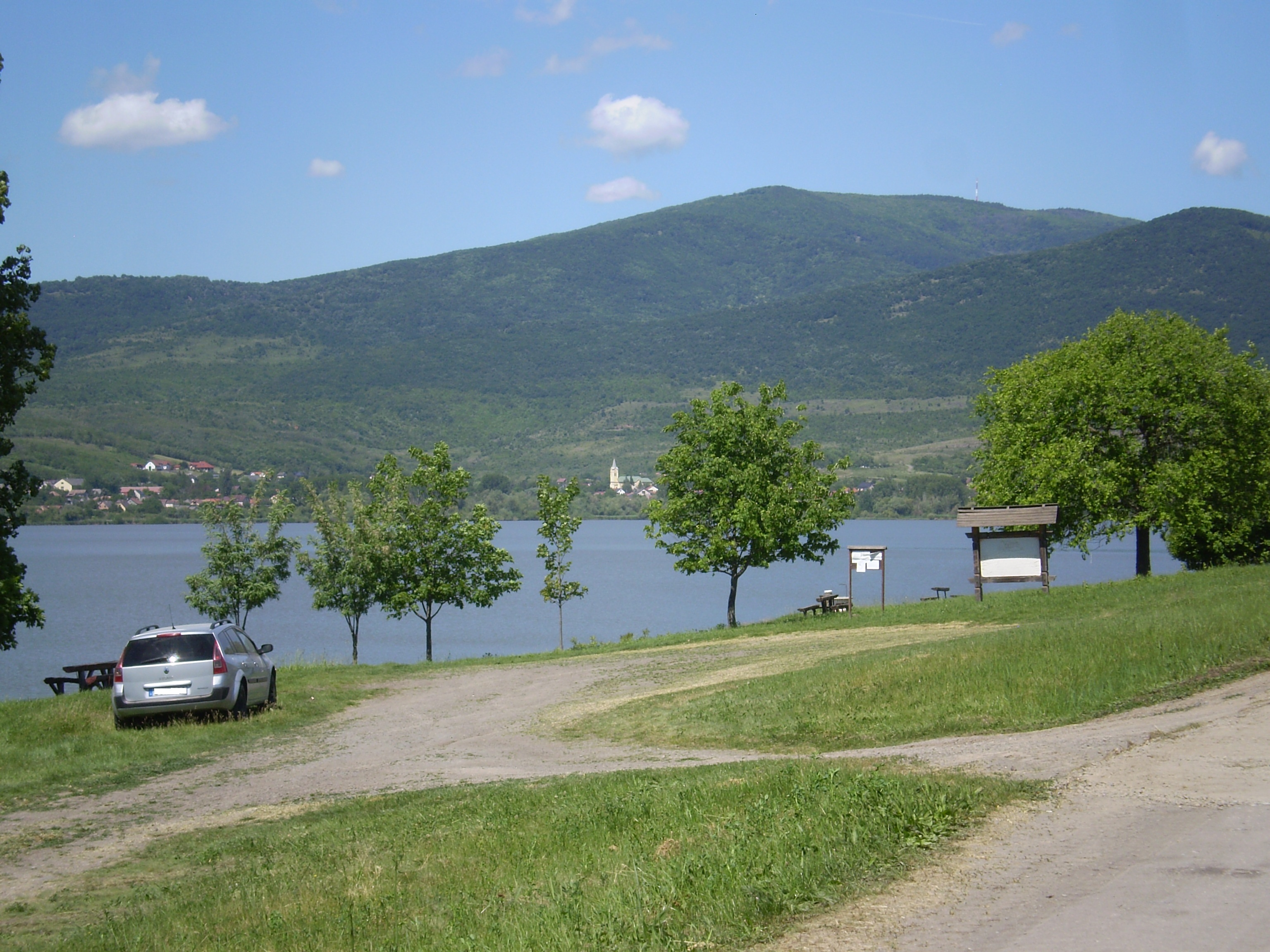
The Markaz Lake

Markaz is a village in Heves County, Hungary, near the Markaz Lake in the Mátra mountain ranges. As of 2022 census, it has a population of 1698 (see Demographics). The village located 13.8 km from (Nr. 85) Vámosgyörk–Gyöngyös railway line, 10.3 km from the main road 3 and 18.1 km from the M3 motorway. The closest train station with public transport in Gyöngyös.

== History ==
The name of the village is first mentioned in the 1332-37 papal tithe list. The Pre-Ottoman name of the settlement was probably named after St. Marks old church of the Village, which predates the later Ottoman administrative (markaz ). However the first well-known owners of the village were the Kompolti family, who built a castle on the hill above the village. In 1522 the Országh family became the landlord, but in 1544 the Ottomans destroyed the castle and the population fled. The remains of the castle are still visible to this day. In the 17th century, the area was owned by the Haller, Nyáry, Petrovay, Huszár, Szunyogh and Bossányi families. In 1742 Gáspár Bossányi reinstated the village with 40 most of the Slovak families. In 1770 were 560, in 1803 730 and in 1851 900 people lived in Markaz. Already in the 15th century, the population lived from viticulture. In the second half of the 18th century and the end of the 19th century, the grapes were reinstalled, after the destruction of the phylloxera epidemic in 1885. The 19th century village's life at that time is presented by the folk museum. The winemaking was carried out after 1949 in cooperative form, but nowadays only a few families working in wineries. Today's church was built in 1911 after the former church collapsed. The Markaz Lake was created in 1968, which is used for sailing, surfing and fishing.

== Demographics ==
According the 2022 census, 90.5% of the population were of Hungarian ethnicity, 1.9% were Gypsies, 0.5% were Germans and 9.4% were did not wish to answer. The religious distribution was as follows: 43.8% Roman Catholic, 2.9% Calvinist, 0.6% Greek Catholic, 9.0% non-denominational, and 39.7% did not wish to answer. The Gypsies have a local nationality government. 48 people live beside of the lake and 17 in other outskirts.

Population by years:

Year	1870	1880	1890	1900	1910	1920	1930	1941
Population	1157	1103	1239	1439	1665	1756	1881	1902
Year	1949	1960	1970	1980	1990	2001	2011	2022
Population	2003	1929	1922	1811	1890	1950	1850	1698

== Politics ==
Mayors since 1990:

- 1990–2002: József Szekrényes (independent)
- 2002–2019: László Potoczki (independent)
- 2019–: László Holló (independent)
