= Kisnána =

- Village
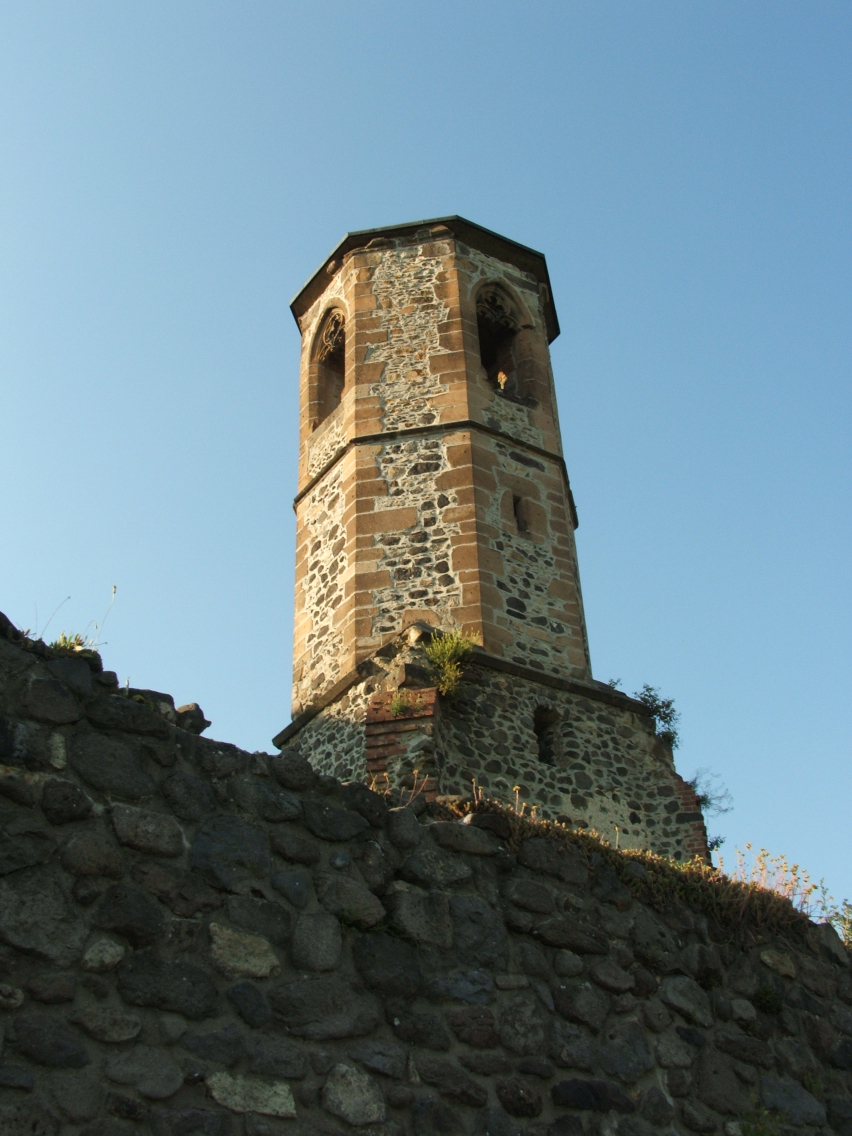
- The ruins of the castle

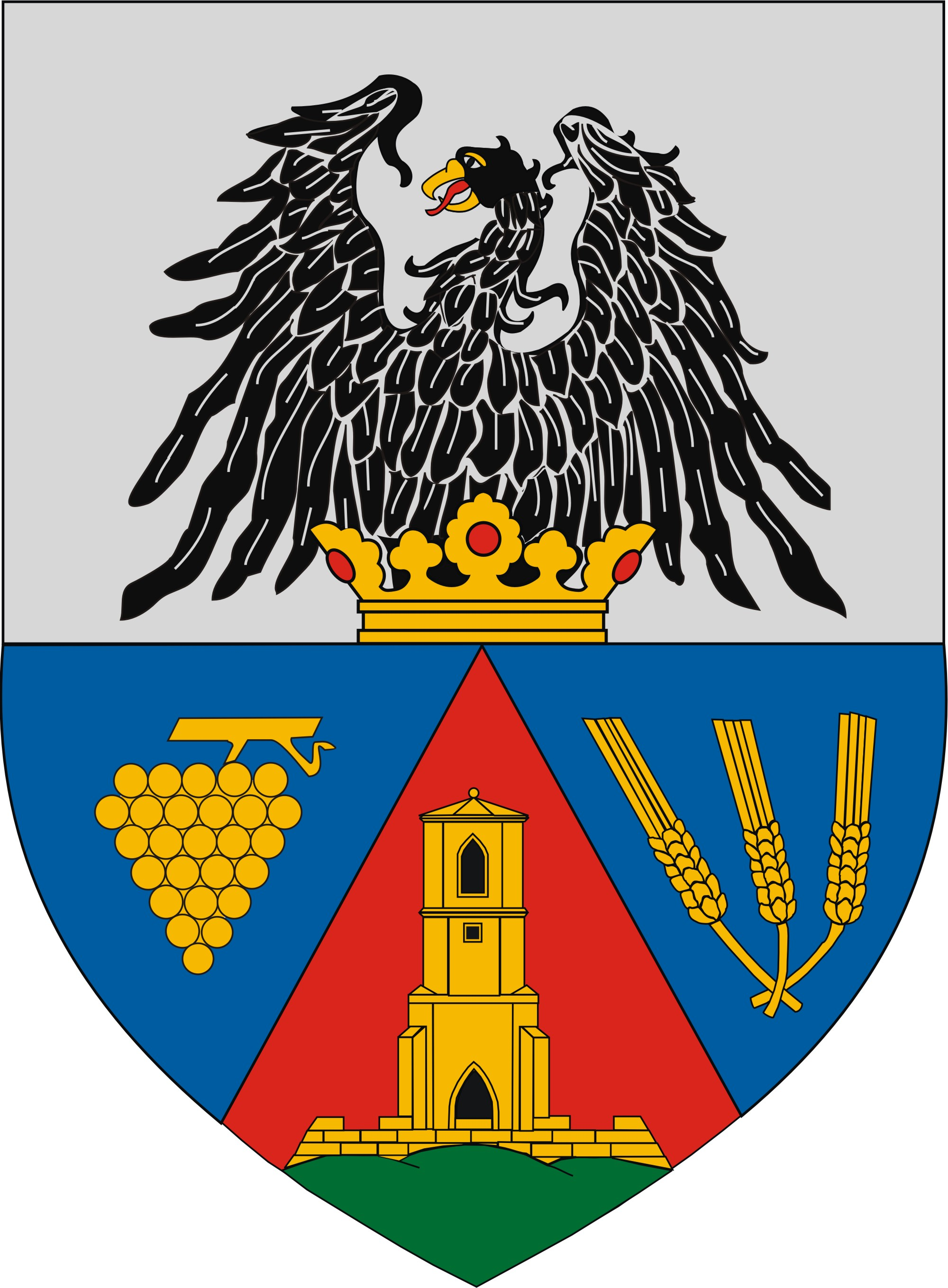
- Coat of arms

- Location in Hungary
- Coordinates: 47°51′07″N 20°08′46″E
- Country: Hungary
- County: Heves
- District: Gyöngyös
- First mentioned: 1325

Government
  - Mayor: Zoltán Varga (Ind.)

Area
  - Total: 22.60 km^{2} (8.73 sq mi)

Population (2022)
  - Total: 937
  - Density: 41.5/km^{2} (107/sq mi)
- Time zone: UTC+1 (CET)
  - Summer (DST): UTC+2 (CEST)
- Postal code: 3264
- Area code: 37
- Website: www.kisnana.hu

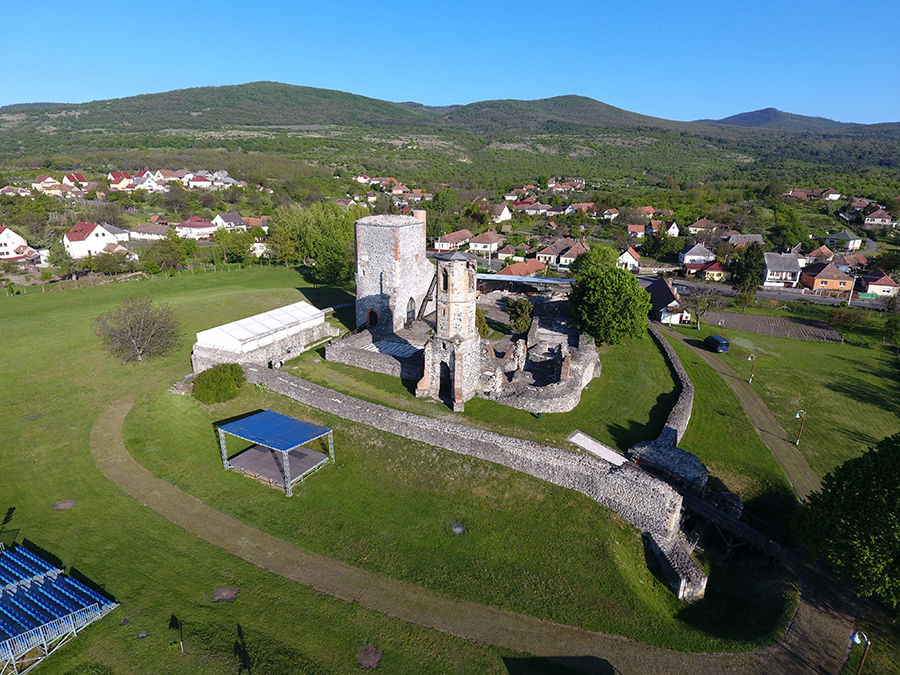
The ruins of the castle from the air

Kisnána is a village in Heves County, Hungary, beside of the Forrás creek in the Mátra mountain ranges. As of 2022 census, it has a population of 937 (see Demographics). The village located 5.9 km from (Nr. 84) Kisterenye–Kál-Kápolna railway line, 16.7 km from the main road 3 and 21.6 km from the M3 motorway. Although the Verpelét railway station is the closest, but public transport on the railway line ceased on March 3, 2007. The closest train station with public transport in Ludas 19,6 km far.

== History ==
The area was the property of the Aba from the 10th century and later the Kompolti family. The chapel of the later castle was built in the Romanesque style in the 12th century, and the village of Egyházasnána, was established around it. Kisnána was first mentioned in 1325, when the sons of Peter Kompolti shared the inheritance. István Kompolti received the village and built his own manor house. Following a fire in 1428, the church was rebuilt in Gothic style as rotunda church. John Kompolti developed the manor house into a castle, which he fortified with paling walls, later replaced by a stone wall. In 1445 it is referred to as the castle of John Kompolti. The Országh family of Guti acquired Kisnána by inheritance in 1522. A wine cellar was built under the castle and the whole castle was fortified. The castle was conquered by the Ottomans in 1543, and the defender of the castle, László Móré, was imprisoned. The castle and its chapel were destroyed in the siege and the inhabitants fled. The settlement was repopulated after 1716, mostly by Slovaks. In addition to agriculture, viticulture was important. The present church of St. Stephen the King was built in the 18th century in Baroque style. During 1962-1966 the castle was excavated and turned into a museum, the most recent renovation being in 2010–2011, when several event halls were created. The village's folk museum was opened in 1971 to showcase the traditions of the local Slovaks. It built in the 1880s next to the castle. In addition, a blacksmith's workshop presents the former industrial life of the village.

== Demographics ==
According the 2022 census, 94.5% of the population were of Hungarian ethnicity, 17.7% were Gypsies, 6.7% were Slovaks, 0.6% Germans and 5.4% were did not wish to answer. The religious distribution was as follows: 46.0% Roman Catholic, 1.9% Calvinist, 10.5% non-denominational, and 38.9% did not wish to answer. The Gypsies and the Slovaks have a local nationality government. No population in farms.

Population by years:

Year	1870	1880	1890	1900	1910	1920	1930	1941
Population	1386	1011	1149	1306	1412	1362	1530	1623
Year	1949	1960	1970	1980	1990	2001	2011	2022
Population	1379	1474	1504	1429	1293	1133	1074	937

== Politics ==
Mayors since 1990:

- 1990–2014: Sándor Koncsos (independent)
- 2014–2024: László Paulenka (independent)
- 2024–: Zoltán Varga (independent)

== Bibliography ==
- Gerő, L.: Magyar műemléki ABC (List of Hungarian Monuments) Műszaki Könyvkiadó, Budapest, 1984
- Henszlmann, I.: Magyarország ó-keresztyén, román és átmeneti stylü mű-emlékeinek rövid ismertetése, (Old-Christian, Romanesque and Transitional Style Architecture in Hungary). Királyi Magyar Egyetemi Nyomda, Budapest, 1876
