= Gyöngyös District =

Coordinates: 47.7833°N 19.9667°E

Gyöngyös District Gyöngyösi járás
- District
- Coat of arms

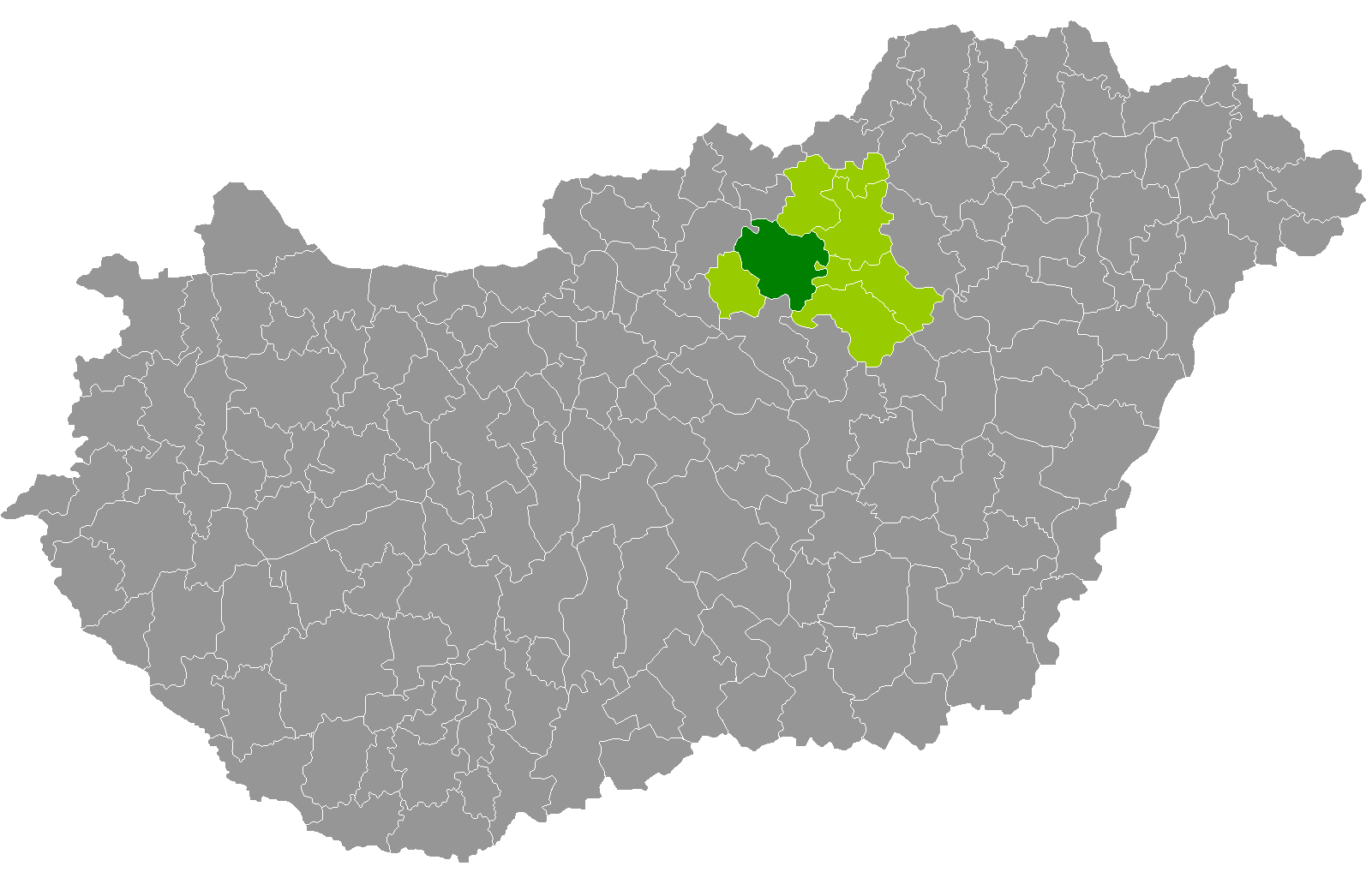
- Gyöngyös District within Hungary and Heves County.
- Country: Hungary
- County: Heves
- District seat: Gyöngyös

Area
  - Total: 750.78 km^{2} (289.88 sq mi)
  - Rank: 1st in Heves

Population (2011 census)
  - Total: 73,834
  - Rank: 2nd in Heves
  - Density: 98/km^{2} (250/sq mi)

Gyöngyös (Hungarian: Gyöngyösi járás) is a district in central-western part of Heves County. Gyöngyös is also the name of the town where the district seat is found. The district is located in the Northern Hungary Statistical Region. This district is a part of Mátra Mountains geographical region.

== Geography ==
Gyöngyös District borders with Bátonyterenye District (Nógrád County) and Pétervására District to the north, Eger District, Füzesabony District and Heves District to the east, Jászberény District (Jász-Nagykun-Szolnok County) to the south, Hatvan District and Pásztó District (Nógrád County) to the west. The number of the inhabited places in Gyöngyös District is 24.

== Municipalities ==
The district has 2 towns and 22 villages. (ordered by population, as of 1 January 2012)

- Abasár (2,498)
- Adács (2,690)
- Atkár (1,695)
- Detk (1,158)
- Domoszló (1,988)
- **Gyöngyös** (32,385) – district seat
- Gyöngyöshalász (2,531)
- Gyöngyösoroszi (1,518)
- **Gyöngyöspata** (2,472)
- Gyöngyössolymos (2,972)
- Gyöngyöstarján (2,460)
- Halmajugra (1,196)
- Karácsond (3,045)
- Kisnána (993)
- Ludas (809)
- Markaz (1,748)
- Mátraszentimre (465)
- Nagyfüged (1,877)
- Nagyréde (3,091)
- Pálosvörösmart (675)
- Vámosgyörk (1,991)
- Vécs (578)
- Visonta (1,127)
- Visznek (1,082)

The bolded municipalities are cities.

== Demographics ==
Religion in Gyöngyös District (2011 census)
1. Catholic Church (53.5%)
2. Greek Catholicism (0.30%)
3. Calvinism (3.60%)
4. Lutheranism (0.30%)
5. Other religions (1.50%)
6. Non-religious (14.5%)
7. Atheists (1.20%)
8. Undeclared (25.1%)

In 2011, it had a population of 73,834 and the population density was 98/km².

Year	County population	Change
2011	73,834	n/a

=== Ethnicity ===
Besides the Hungarian majority, the main minorities are the Roma (approx. 4,000), Slovak (400), German (300) and Romanian (150).

Total population (2011 census): 73,834
Ethnic groups (2011 census): Identified themselves: 70,115 persons:

- Hungarians: 65,039 (92.76%)
- Gypsies: 3,564 (5.08%)
- Others and indefinable: 1,512 (2.16%)

Approx. 3,500 persons in Gyöngyös District did not declare their ethnic group at the 2011 census.

=== Religion ===
Religious adherence in the county according to 2011 census:

- Catholic – 39,722 (Roman Catholic – 39,490; Greek Catholic – 225);
- Reformed – 2,675;
- Evangelical – 214;
- other religions – 1,082;
- Non-religious – 10,725;
- Atheism – 891;
- Undeclared – 18,525.

== Gallery ==
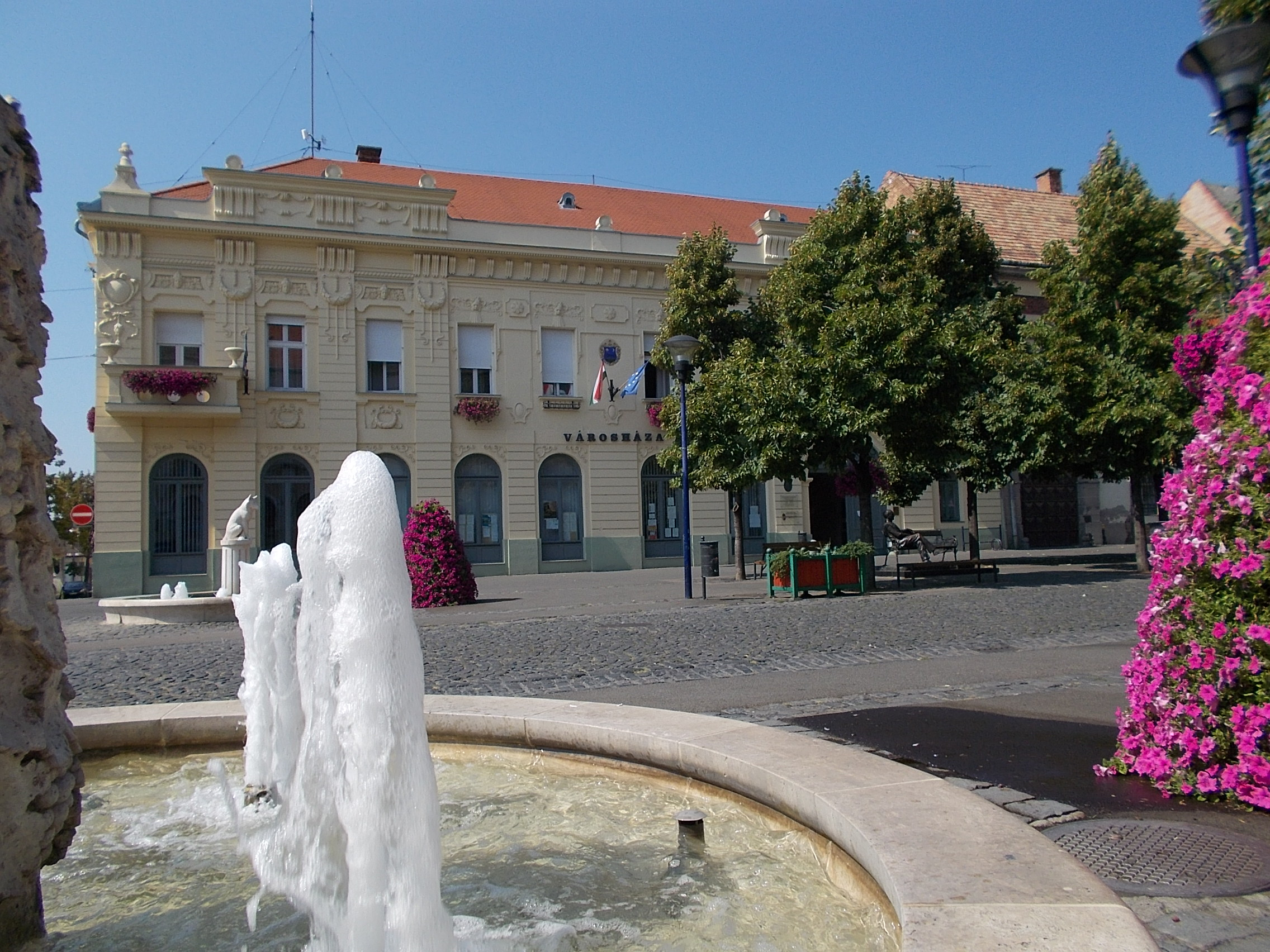
Gyöngyös, Town Hall

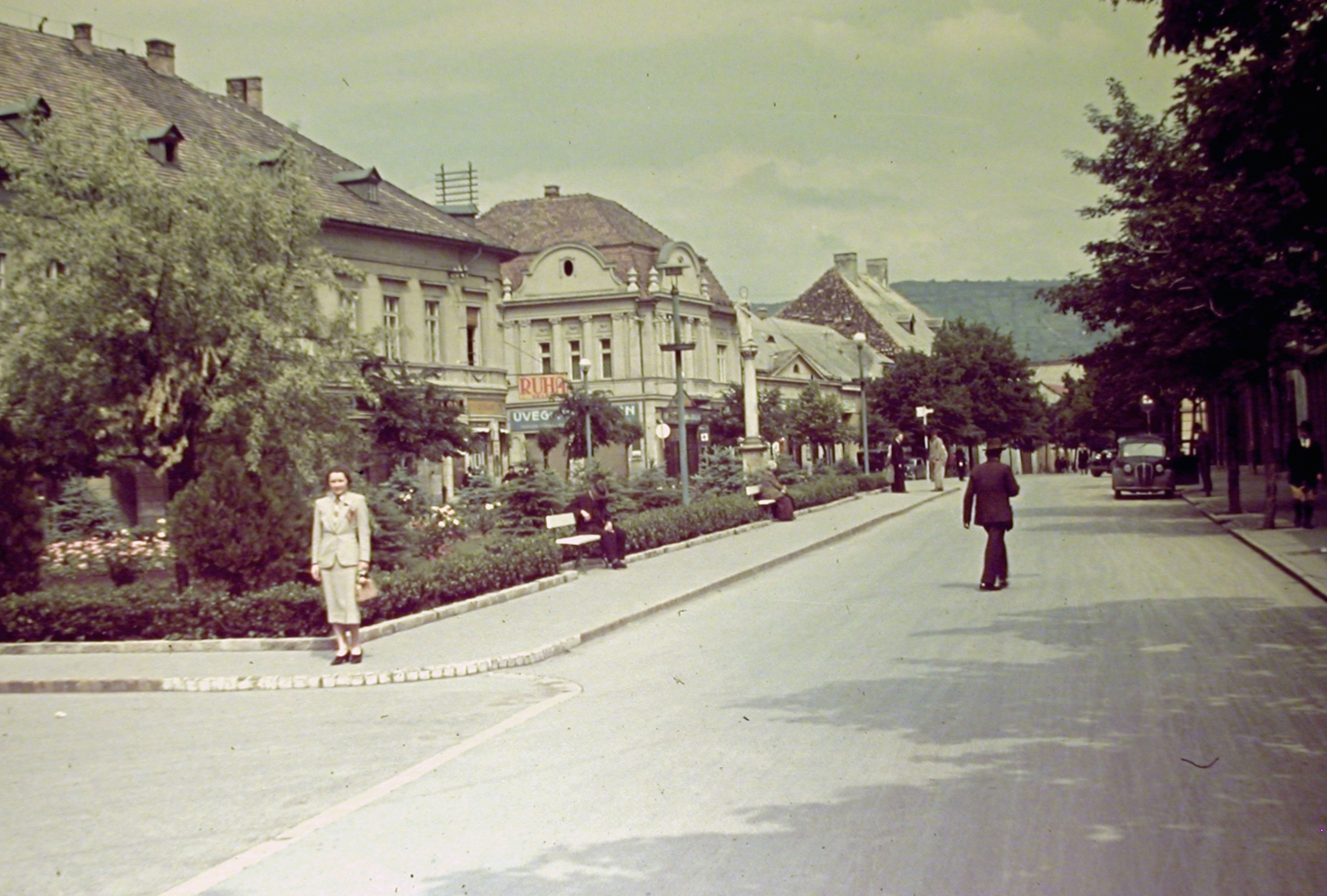
Gyöngyös 1938

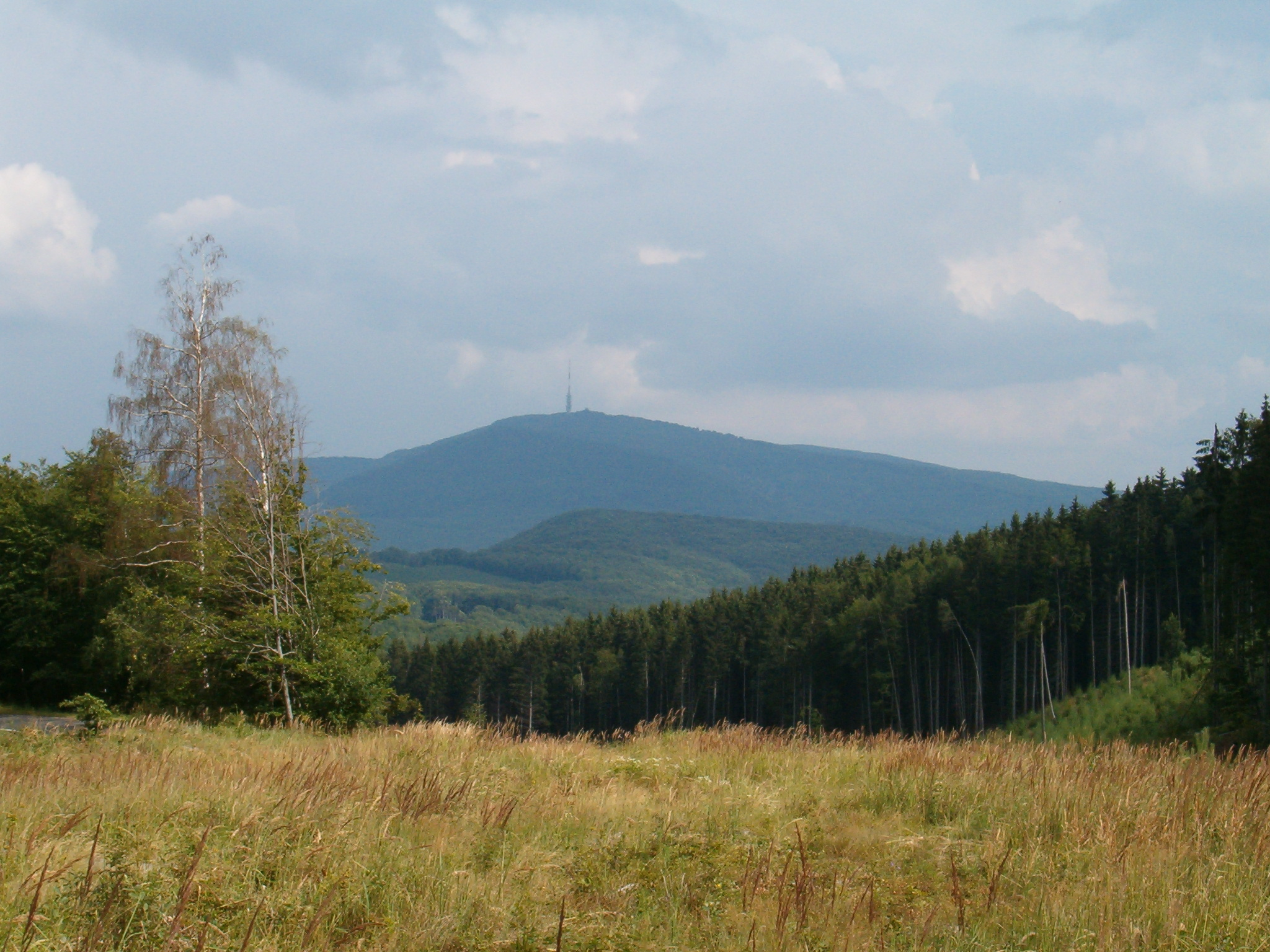
View of Kékes

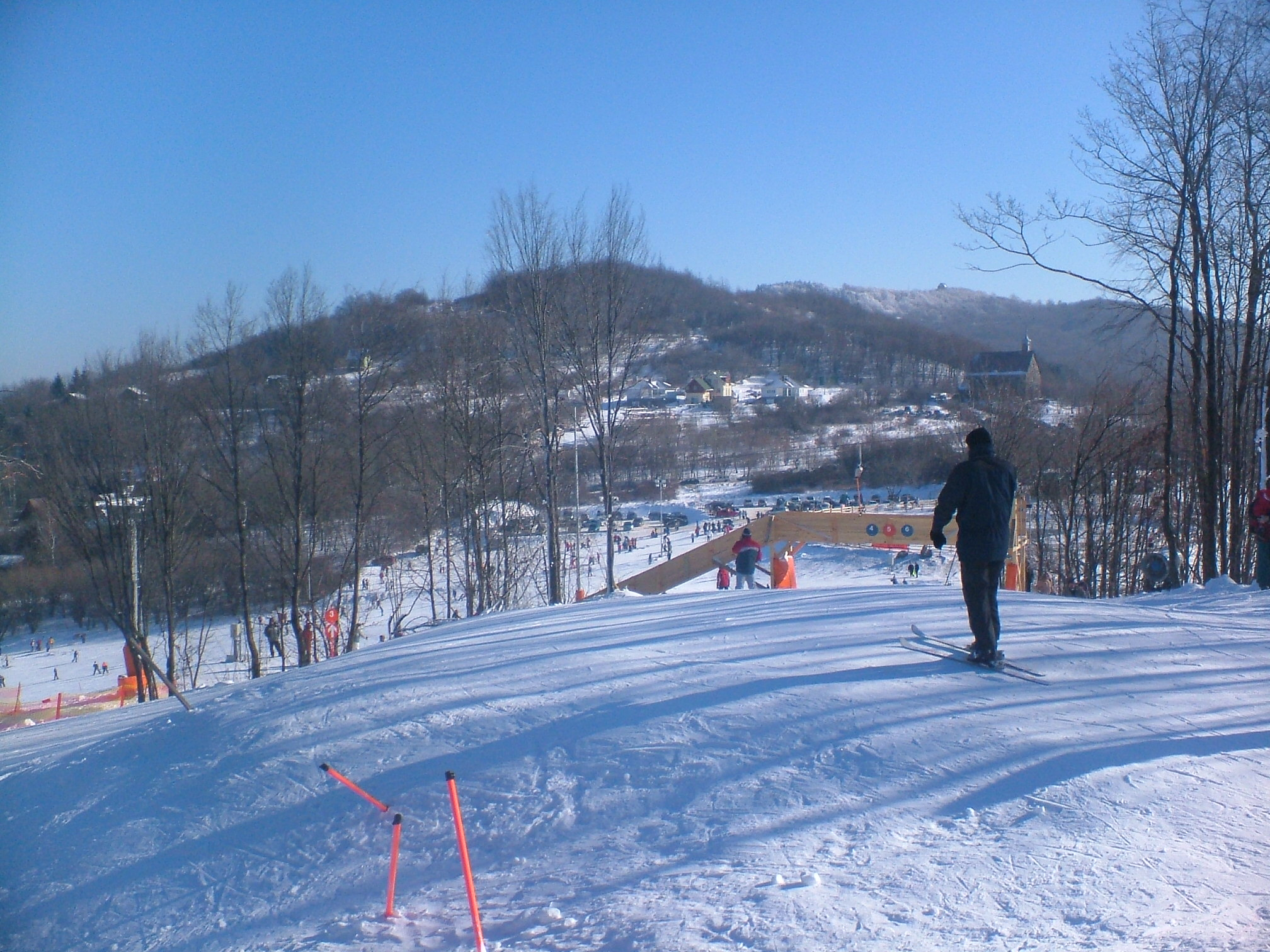
Ski resort in Mátraszentistván

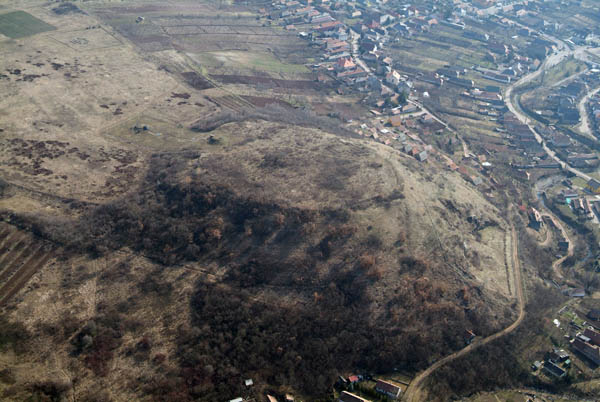
Castle Ruins of Gyöngyöspata

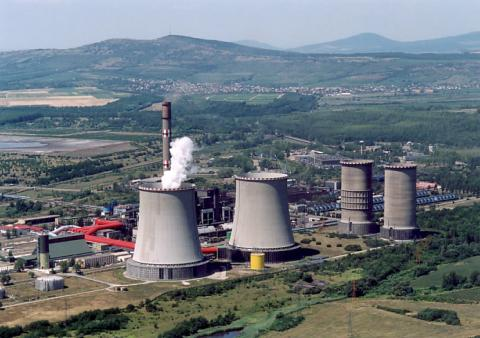
Mátra Power Plant near Visonta

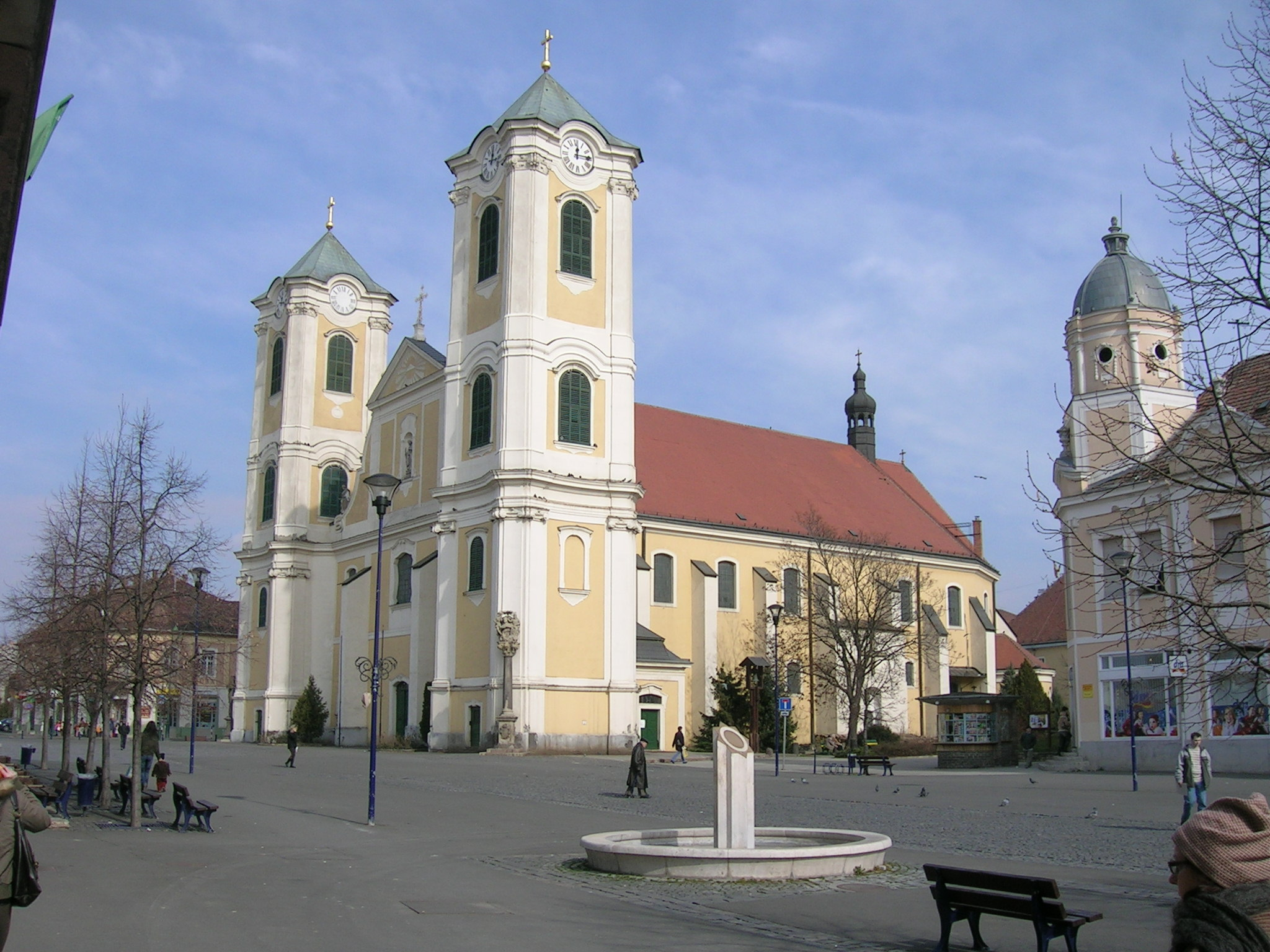
Saint Bartholomew Church in Gyöngyös

== See also ==
- List of cities and towns of Hungary
