= Pálosvörösmart =

- Village
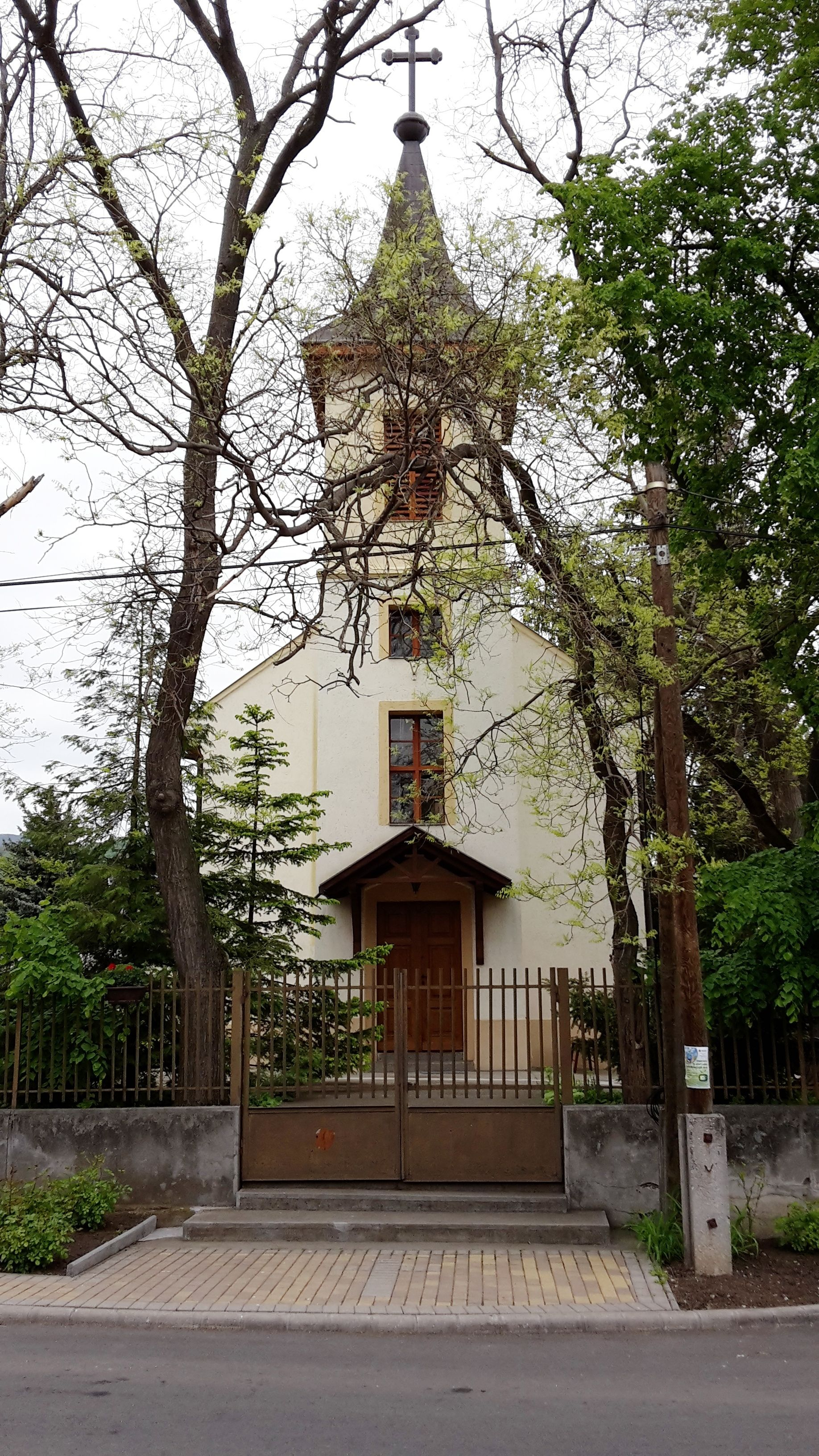
- Nativity of John the Baptist Church

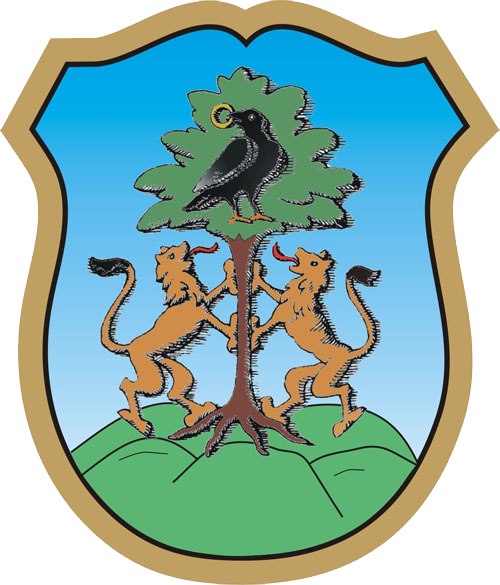
- Coat of arms

- Location in Hungary
- Coordinates: 47°48′53″N 19°59′53″E
- Country: Hungary
- County: Heves
- District: Gyöngyös
- First mentioned: 1304

Government
  - Mayor: Attila Bodócs (Ind.)

Area
  - Total: 5.84 km^{2} (2.25 sq mi)

Population (2022)
  - Total: 585
  - Density: 100/km^{2} (259/sq mi)
- Time zone: UTC+1 (CET)
  - Summer (DST): UTC+2 (CEST)
- Postal code: 3261
- Area code: 37
- Website: www.palosvorosmart.hu

Pálosvörösmart is a village in Heves County, Hungary, beside of the Bene creek, in the Mátra mountain ranges. As of 2022 census, it has a population of 585 (see Demographics). The village located 8.6 km from (Nr. 85) Vámosgyörk–Gyöngyös railway line, 7.6 km from the main road 3 and 14.9 km from the M3 motorway. The closest train station with public transport in Gyöngyös.

== History ==
The first mention of the village is from 1304, when the Csobánka family donated the area to the Order of Saint Paul. The area donated was larger than the current area of the village. The Pauline Fathers built a church and a monastery in 1334. In the 15th century, the number of monks was over one hundred. In the middle of the 16th century, the monks fled the territory, because of the Ottomans. The treasures of the monastery and the church were fled to Gyöngyös. Bricklayers settled around the monastery in the 18th century, they were the first inhabitants of the village. King Joseph II disbanded the order in 1782 and the area was treated by the state. In the 19th century, the population was employed in agriculture and in the construction industry and the present church built up. In the 20th century, after multiple reduction of the territory, the village was annexed to Abasár in 1951 by the Presidential Council. Pálosvörösmart's self-resistance efforts began in 1992, which reached its goal in 2006 and the self-governance of the village was formed.

== Demographics ==
According the 2022 census, 92.0% of the population were of Hungarian ethnicity, 0.5% were Germans, and 7.8% were did not wish to answer. The religious distribution was as follows: 42.9% Roman Catholic, 6.6% Calvinist, 11.4% non-denominational, and 38.5% did not wish to answer. No population in farms.

Population by years:

Year	1870	1880	1890	1900	1910	1920	1930	1941
Population	381	348	389	433	429	408	435	506
Year	1949	1960	1970	1980	1990	2001	2011	2022
Population	454	976	963	834	729	671	650	585

== Politics ==
Mayors since 2006:

- 2006–2014: László Dobróka (independent)
- 2014–2016: Mrs. Gábor Bakos (independent)
- 2016–2019: Beáta Bene-Sinkó (independent)
- 2019–: Attila Bodócs (independent)
