= Road (Hungarian band) =

- Origin: Domoszló, Hungary
- Genres: Rock, hard rock, heavy metal, modern rock
- Years active: 2004–present
- Label: Hammer Music
- Website: http://www.road.hu

Road is a Hungarian rock band from Domoszló, Heves County, Hungary. Formed in 2004, Road consists of bassist-singer Máté Molnár, guitarist Zsolt B. Golyán "Goya", guitarist Imre Kádár and drummer Erik Szabó. The band's lineup has changed in 2021 when drummer Erik Szabó left the band due to privacy reasons and was replaced by Tamás Tóth.

Road's style of music – "Rock n' Road" – is a kind of characterful Hungarian countryside rock/heavy metal music. The guitar sound is distorted, the tempo is mainly energetic. Road also uses folkish motives in some of its songs, and the band has an acoustic repertoire, as well. They have already had special production together with a brass orchestra. Road is one of the most active rock bands in Hungary with high record sales and concert attendance.

Road has released nine studio albums, a best of album, a live album, two DVD-s, one acoustic live album and eighteen music videos (one of them - "M.A.T.E." - is in English) so far and has also published a book of the band's story. Three of their albums has reached gold and two of them platinum status. The band still works in its members' childhood region called Mátraalja and they are on tour the whole of the year throughout Hungary as well as in trans-border areas inhabited by Hungarians.

== Members ==
- Zsolt B. Golyán "Goya" – guitar
- Imre Kádár – guitar
- Máté Molnár – bass guitar and vocals
- Tamás Tóth – drums and percussion

== Albums ==
Year	Album title	translation
2004	Nem kell más	No need for anyone else
2006	Második harapás	Second bite
2008	Aranylemez	Gold record
2010	Emberteremtő	Man creator
2013	Tegyük fel...	Suppose...
2015	M.A.T.T.	M.A.T.E.
2017	Tizenhét	Seventeen
2018	A tökéletesség hibája	The mistake of perfection
2021	Senki Kedvéért nem Fékezünk	We don't slow down for anyone's sake
2024	Az utolsó rapszódia	The last rhapsody

== Videos ==
Year	DVD title	translation
2009	Heves megye Lordjai	The Dukes of Heves
2014	Road Movie X Jubileumi DVD	Road Movie X Jubilee DVD
