= Abasár =

- Village
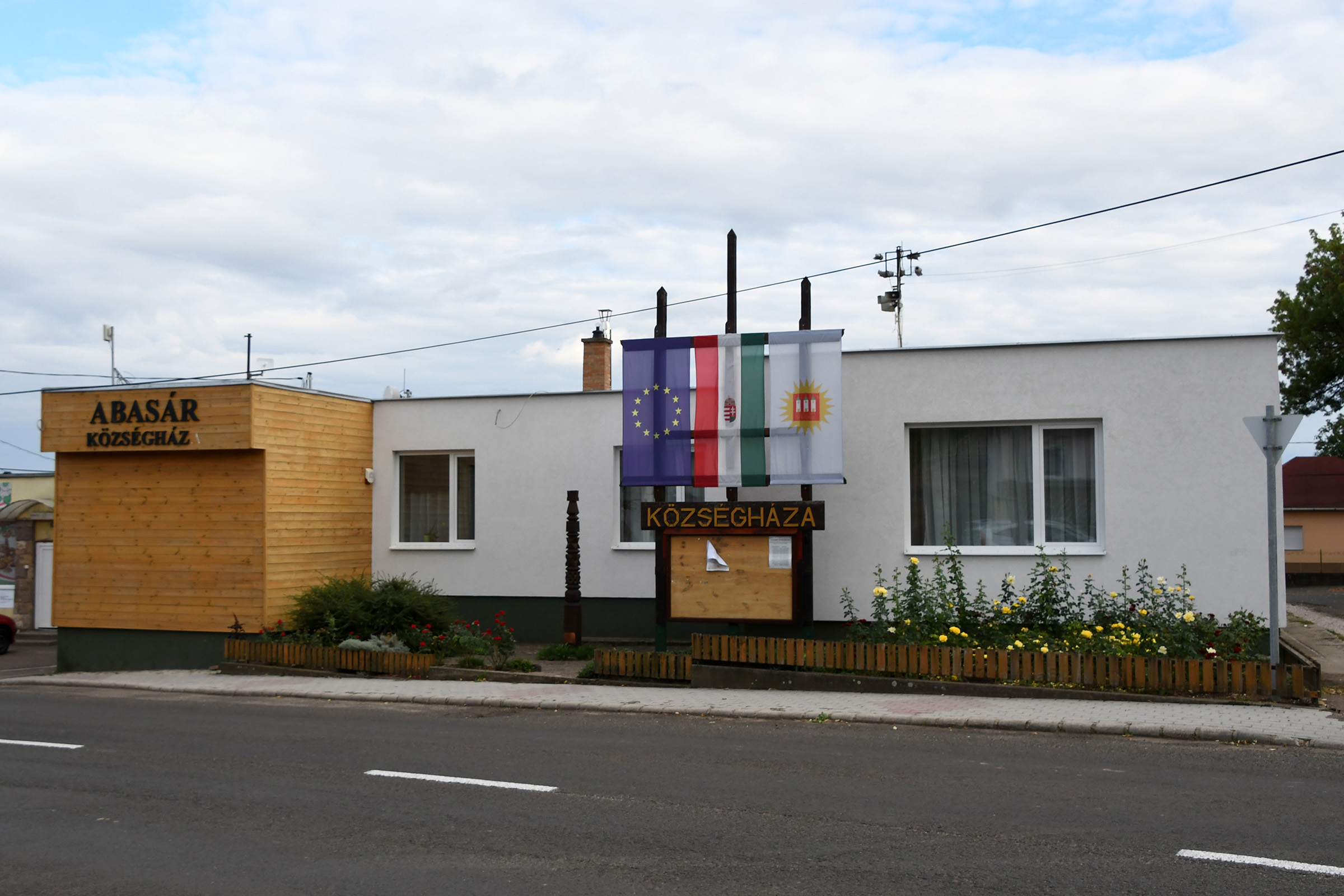
- Village hall

- Coat of arms

- Location in Hungary
- Coordinates: 47°48′09″N 20°00′27″E
- Country: Hungary
- County: Heves
- District: Gyöngyös
- First mentioned: 1261

Government
  - Mayor: Attila Kazsu (Ind.)

Area
  - Total: 20.82 km^{2} (8.04 sq mi)

Population (2022)
  - Total: 2,501
  - Density: 120.1/km^{2} (311.1/sq mi)
- Time zone: UTC+1 (CET)
  - Summer (DST): UTC+2 (CEST)
- Postal code: 3261
- Area code: 37
- Website: www.abasar.hu

Abasár is a village in Heves County, Hungary, under the Sár mountain (500 m), in the Mátra mountain ranges. As of the 2022 census, it has a population of 2501 (see Demographics). The village ia located 7.4 km from (Nr. 85) Vámosgyörk–Gyöngyös railway line, 4.3 km from the main road 3 and 11.7 km from the M3 motorway. The closest train station with public transport in Gyöngyös.

== History ==
The tools found on the outskirts of the village prove that the settlement was inhabited in the Bronze Age. The area was settled by the Kabars in the 9th century and the Aba genus owned the land. King Samuel built a Benedictine monastery in the settlement. According to tradition the king was buried in Feldebrő, but later reburied here. The village firstly mentioned in 1261 as Saár. Since the Middle Ages the population has lived from viticulture. The riesling, leányka and muscat blanc wines produced here are outstanding. The present church of the village was built in the Baroque style around 1730. The Kapás house folk museum built of mudbrick and preserving the traditional 18th century furnishings. The castle of Baldácsy Antal - built in the 19th century - is now a library. A monument was erected to the Five million unborn Hungarians in 1991 to raise awareness for the protection of foetal life.

== Demographics ==
According the 2022 census, 87.2% of the population were of Hungarian ethnicity, 0.5% were Gypsies, and 12.5% were did not wish to answer. The religious distribution was as follows: 39.2% Roman Catholic, 2.8% Calvinist, 0.5% Greek Catholic, 13.1% non-denominational, and 42.0% did not wish to answer. No population in farms.

Population by years:

Year	1870	1880	1890	1900	1910	1920	1930	1941
Population	2125	1941	2168	2411	2690	2729	2966	3002
Year	1949	1960	1970	1980	1990	2001	2011	2022
Population	3199	2913	2897	2790	2568	2586	2552	2501

== Politics ==
Mayors since 1990:

- 1990–1998: Béla Juhász (independent, but from 1994 KDNP)
- 1998–2002: Ferenc Dér (independent)
- 2002–2019: Anikó Benei, Mrs. Lénárt (MSZP-SZDSZ, but from 2010 independent)
- 2019–: Attila Kazsu (independent)
