= Gyöngyöspata =

- Town
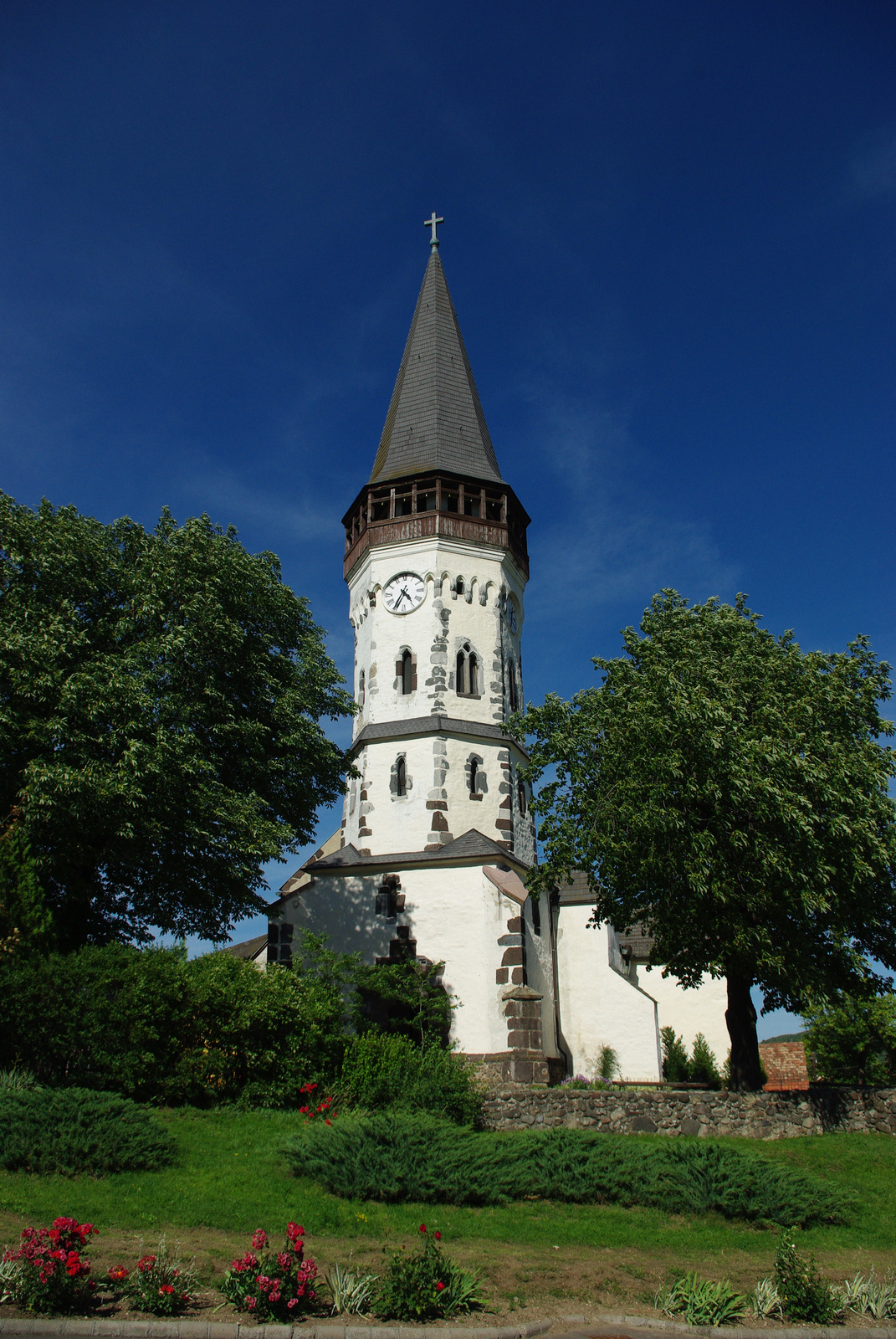
- Nativity of Mary Church

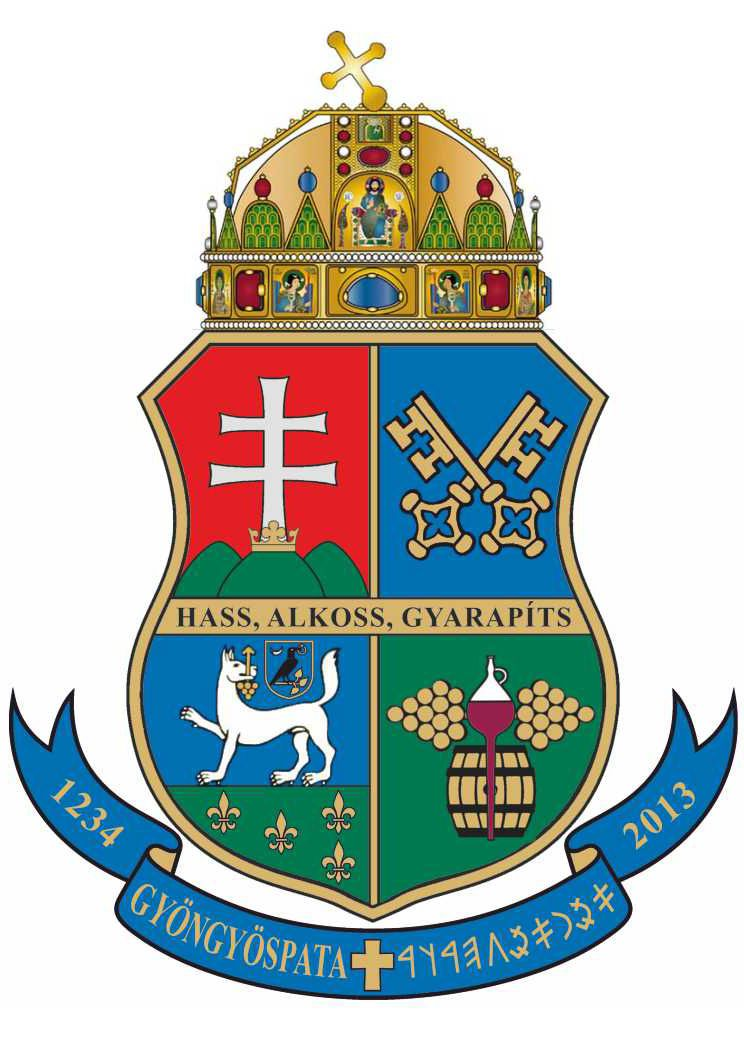
- Coat of arms

- Location in Hungary
- Coordinates: 47°48′50″N 19°47′22″E
- Country: Hungary
- County: Heves
- District: Gyöngyös
- First mentioned: 1010

Government
  - Mayor: Mrs. László Hevér (Fidesz–KDNP)

Area
  - Total: 60.75 km^{2} (23.46 sq mi)

Population (2022)
  - Total: 2,338
  - Density: 38.49/km^{2} (99.68/sq mi)
- Time zone: UTC+1 (CET)
  - Summer (DST): UTC+2 (CEST)
- Postal code: 3035
- Area code: 37
- Website: www.gyongyospata.hu

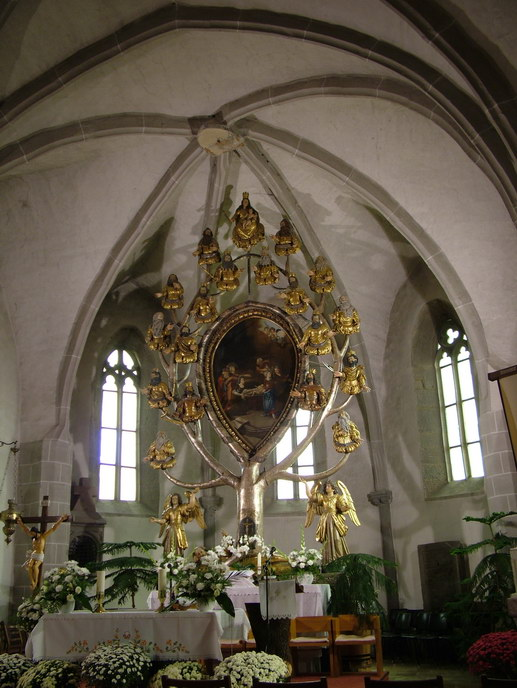
Altar of the church

Gyöngyöspata is a town in Heves County, Hungary, beside of the Danka creek, under the Mátra mountain ranges. As of 2022 census, it has a population of 2338 (see Demographics). The village located 9.1 km from (Nr. 81) Hatvan–Fiľakovo railway line, 10.5 km from the main road 21 and 19.7 km from the M3 motorway. The closest train station with public transport in Szurdokpüspöki.

== History ==
The settlement is located in an area inhabited since the 7th century. According to Anonymus, it gets its name from Chief Pata, who is the ancestor of the later King Sámuel and the Aba clan. Pata had a castle built from burned clay on the hill above the settlement. Next to the castle, St. Peter's church was built in 1010, which became the seat of the archdeacon. The settlement is mentioned for the first time in 1234 in a deed that has survived to this day. In 1241, the Tatars destroyed the church. The church of Nativity of Mary built in the present-day center of the settlement around 1305. Until the 14th century, Gyöngyöspata was the second most populous settlement in Heves county, which was given the status of a market town. In the 1440s, the area came under the rule of Jan Jiskra, who entrusted the defense of the castle to Hussites mercenaries. King Matthias I occupied and destroyed the castle on June 8, 1460. The king granted Gyöngyöspata a tax exemption, a copy of the donation letter is kept in the church, together with the chalice made to commemorate the king's victory. The church was rebuilt in the Gothic style in the 15th century. After the Ottoman rule between 1554 and 1685, the church was decorated with an 8 m high carved baroque altar, on which the descendants of Jesse can be seen in gilded painted statues on the gilded branches of a silver tree. In the center of the tree is an altar picture of Mary's birth. Patai Graduale, which contains the notes of the cantor of Pata, is also exhibited in the church. In 1871, the settlement lost its status as a market town. However, the winemaking still determines the economy of the settlement. The memory of traditional dress is preserved in the Palóc folk museum. The notable native of the town is the writer József Patai (1882–1953). Gyöngyöspata was granted town status on July 15, 2013.

== Demographics ==
According the 2022 census, 92.0% of the population were of Hungarian ethnicity, 4.9% were Gypsies, 0.6% were Germans, 0.5% were Romanians and 8.0% were did not wish to answer. The religious distribution was as follows: 47.1% Roman Catholic, 2.5% Calvinist, 12.1% non-denominational, and 36.0% did not wish to answer. The Gypsies have a local nationality government. 9 people live in 3 farms.

Population by years:

Year	1870	1880	1890	1900	1910	1920	1930	1941
Population	2448	2260	2556	2663	2726	2875	3077	3359
Year	1949	1960	1970	1980	1990	2001	2011	2022
Population	3452	3575	3401	3170	2814	2781	2674	2338

== Politics ==
Mayors since 1990:

- 1990–2006: Károly Molnár (independent)
- 2006–2010: József Molnár † (independent)
- 2010–2011: László Tábi (independent)
- 2011–2014: János Oszkár Juhász (Jobbik)
- 2014–: Mrs. László Hevér (Fidesz–KDNP)

In 2011, far-right paramilitary groups invaded the settlement and kept the Gypsies living there in fear for months. According to their claim, due to the increase in the number of crimes, they have to perform voluntary police duties. The incident led to the resignation of the mayor. Later the police eventually arrested several extremists. In the following years, 63 Gypsy students received compensation due to school segregation revealed.
