= Vámosgyörk =

- Location of Vámosgyörk
- Coordinates: 47°41′6″N 19°55′30″E
- Country: Hungary
- Region: Northern Hungary
- County: Heves County

Area
  - Total: 21.81 km^{2} (8.42 sq mi)

Population (2025)
  - Total: 2,032
- Postal Code: 3291
- Area Code: 37

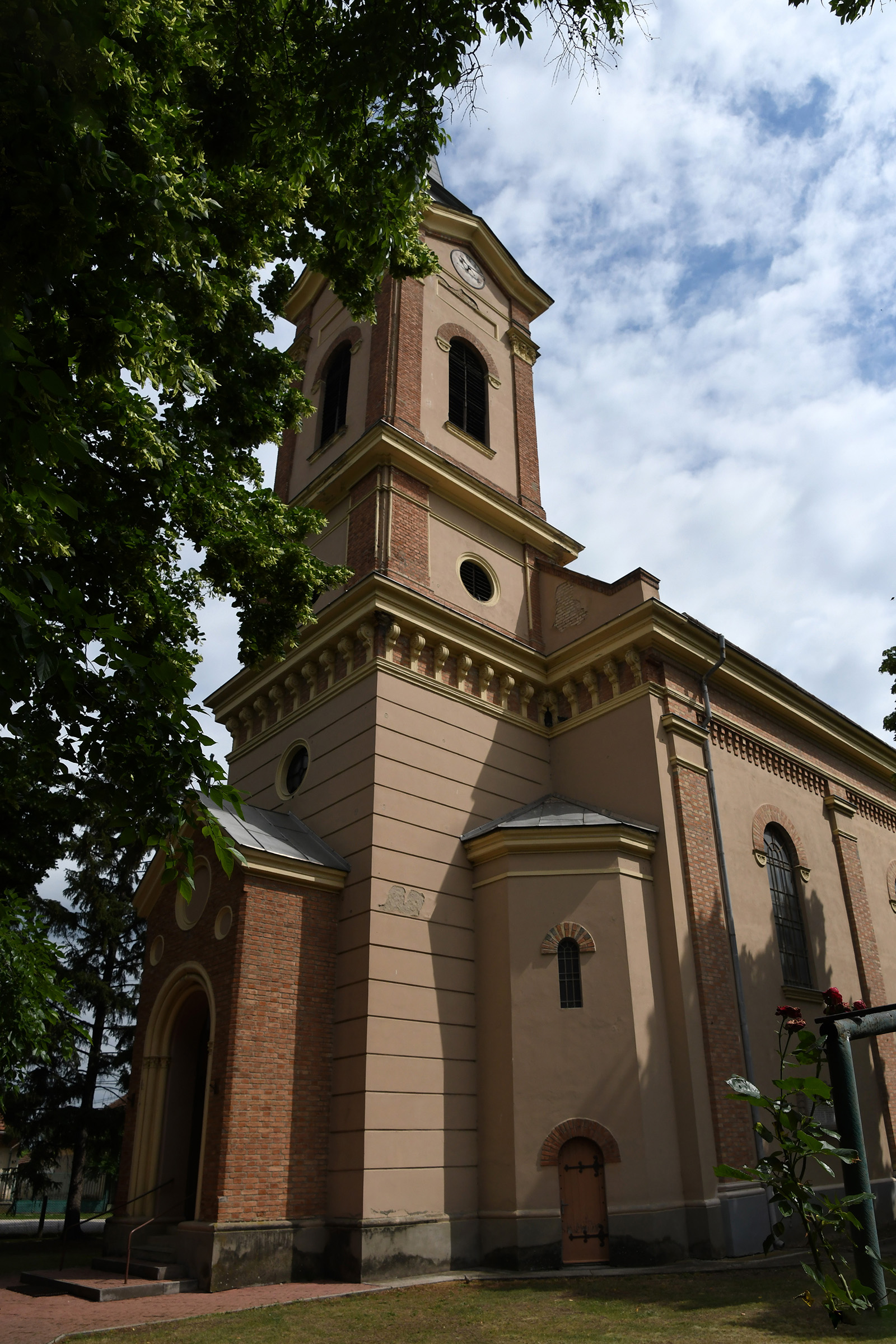

Vámosgyörk is a village in Heves County, Hungary. The population in 2025 was 2032.

== Location ==
Vámosgyörk lies within Heves County, just north of neighboring Jász-Nagykun-Szolnok County. The village is on the Great Hungarian Plain about 12 kilometres (7.5 mi) south of Gyöngyös, between the Rédei-Nagy Brook and Gyöngyös Brook (Hungarian: Rédei-Nagy-patak, Gyöngyös-patak). Vámosgyörk is about 90 kilometres (56 mi) from Budapest; other neighboring villages include Jászárokszállás (about 7 kilometres (4.3 mi)), Adács (about 5 kilometres (3.1 mi)), and Atkár (about 5 kilometres (3.1 mi))
