= Domoszló =

- Village
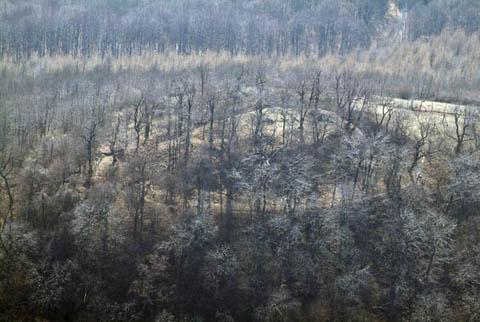
- The ruins of the Oroszlánkő castle

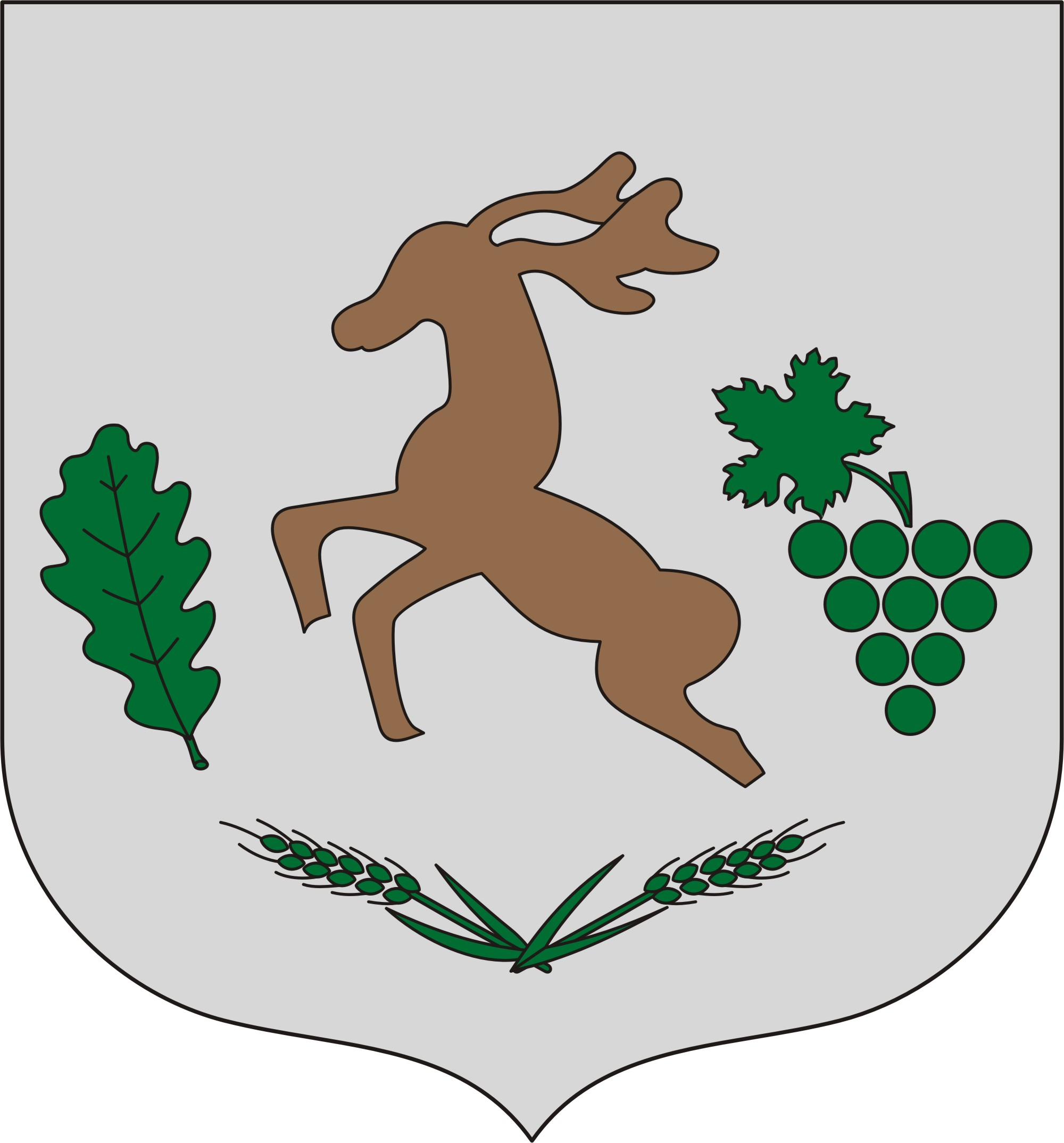
- Coat of arms

- Location in Hungary
- Coordinates: 47°49′52″N 20°07′08″E
- Country: Hungary
- County: Heves
- District: Gyöngyös
- First mentioned: 1263

Government
  - Mayor: Richárd Paulenka (Fidesz–KDNP)

Area
  - Total: 40.02 km^{2} (15.45 sq mi)

Population (2022)
  - Total: 1,861
  - Density: 46.50/km^{2} (120.4/sq mi)
- Time zone: UTC+1 (CET)
  - Summer (DST): UTC+2 (CEST)
- Postal code: 3263
- Area code: 37
- Website: www.domoszlo.hu

Domoszló is a village in Heves County, Hungary, beside of the Domoszlói creek in the Mátra mountain ranges. As of the 2022 census, it had a population of 1861 people.

The settlement is located 10.1 km from the Nr. 84 Kisterenye–Kál-Kápolna railway line, 12.1 kilometers from Main road 3 and 16.6 kilometers from the M3 motorway. The Verpelét railway station was the nearest form of public transportation, however, it was closed on March 3, 2007. Today, the closest means of public transport is in Ludas, 14.6 kilometers away.

== History ==
According to local folklore and culture, the settlement was named after Prince Domoszló, son of King Samuel, from whom the Kompolti family descended. His name, in turn, came from a Slavic personal name: Domoslav.

King Stephen V confirmed the charter of privilege of Aba Kompolt In 1263. In 1522, the village became the property of the Országh family via a succession treaty between the Kompolt and Országh families. After the death of Kristóf Országh in 1567, King Maximilian II agreed to the succession of the female branch and the estate passed to Borbala Országh and her husband Ferenc Török. The population of the settlement fled from the Ottoman conquerors around the 16th century. King Leopold I donated Domoszló to John Einczinger in 1698 and finally, István Tarródy came into possession of the area through a purchase in 1722.

The ethnicity of the population which resettled in the 18th century were mostly Slovaks; the village had 598 inhabitants in 1746 and 804 in 1767. The church of St. Demeter was built in the Baroque style in 1739, allowing one of the rose windows of the monastery that once stood in it, to be incorporated into the church. The castle of Oroszlánkő, which ruins are barely visible today, was built north of the village in the 13th century.

== Demographics ==
According the 2022 census, 91.5% of the population were of Hungarian ethnicity, 1.1% were Gypsies and 8.5% were did not wish to answer.

The religious distributions were: 42.3% Roman Catholic, 2.8% Calvinist, 8.7% non-denominational, and 43.1% did not wish to answer. The Gypsies have a local nationality government. No population in farms.

Population by decades:

Year	1870	1880	1890	1900	1910	1920	1930	1941
Population	1951	1742	1985	2150	2391	2586	2620	2655
Year	1949	1960	1970	1980	1990	2001	2011	2022
Population	2827	2789	2678	2445	2264	2179	2053	1861

== Politics ==
Mayors since 1990:

- 1990–2002: Sándor Krizsó (Independent)
- 2002–2010: Béla Gyurkó (Independent)
- 2010–2017: István Havelant † (Fidesz–KDNP)
- 2017–: Richárd Paulenka (Fidesz–KDNP)
