= Gyöngyöshalász =

- Village (község)
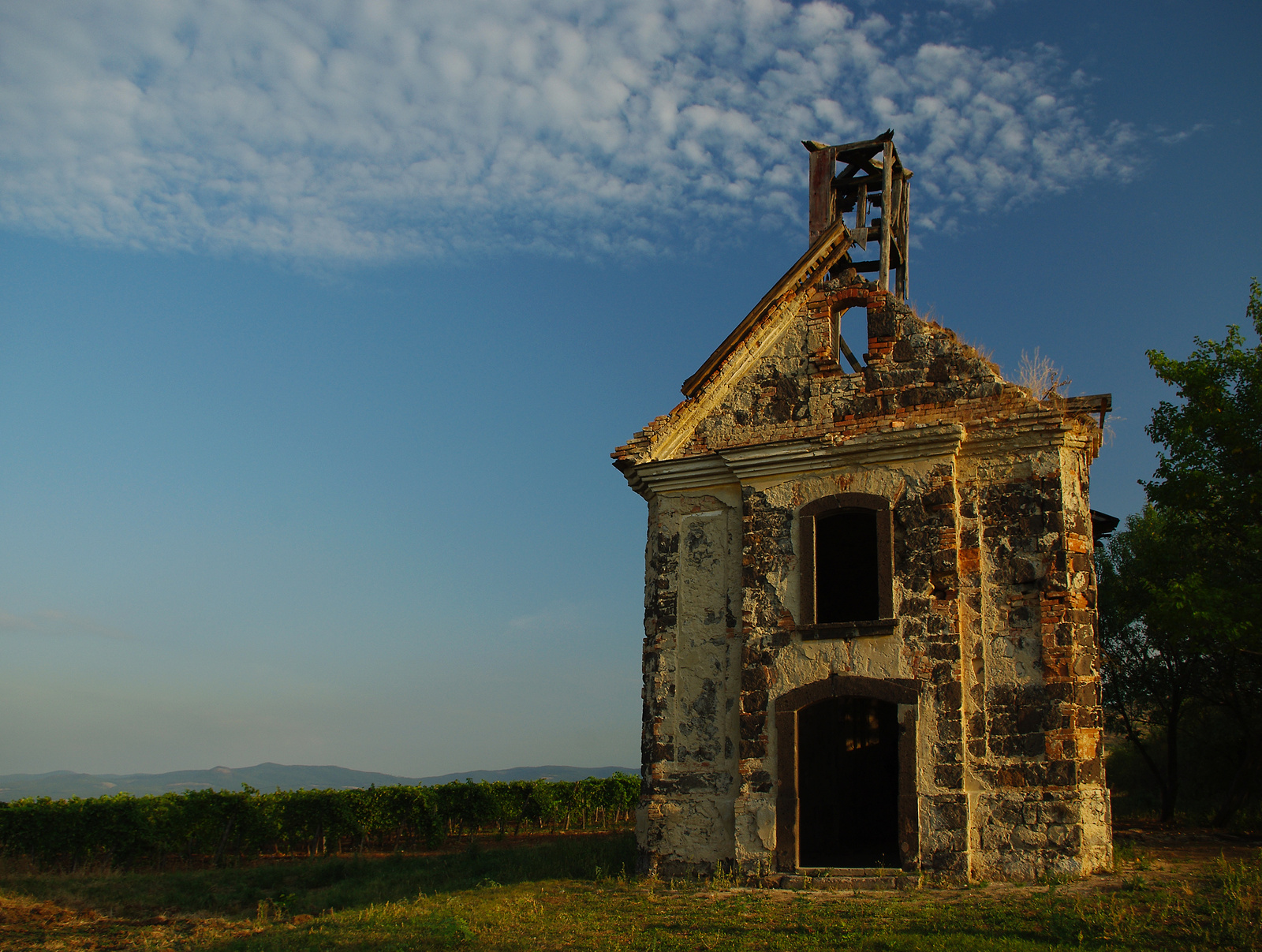

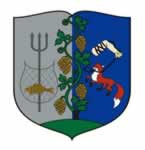
- Coat of arms

- Location of Heves County in Hungary

- Location in Hungary
- Coordinates: 47°44′31″N 19°56′19″E
- Country: Hungary
- Region: Northern Hungary
- County: Heves County
- District: Gyöngyös District

Government
  - Mayor: Pásztor János (Ind.)

Area
  - Total: 27.13 km^{2} (10.47 sq mi)

Population (2015)
  - Total: 2,503
  - Density: 92.26/km^{2} (239.0/sq mi)
- Time zone: UTC+1 (CET)
  - Summer (DST): UTC+2 (CEST)
- Postal code: 3212
- Area code: 37
- Website: http://gyongyoshalasz.hu/

Gyöngyöshalász is a village in Heves County, Hungary.

The town is located between Gyöngyös and Atkár. A famous physicist, István Lovas was born in Gyöngyöshalász.
