= Gyöngyösoroszi =

- Village
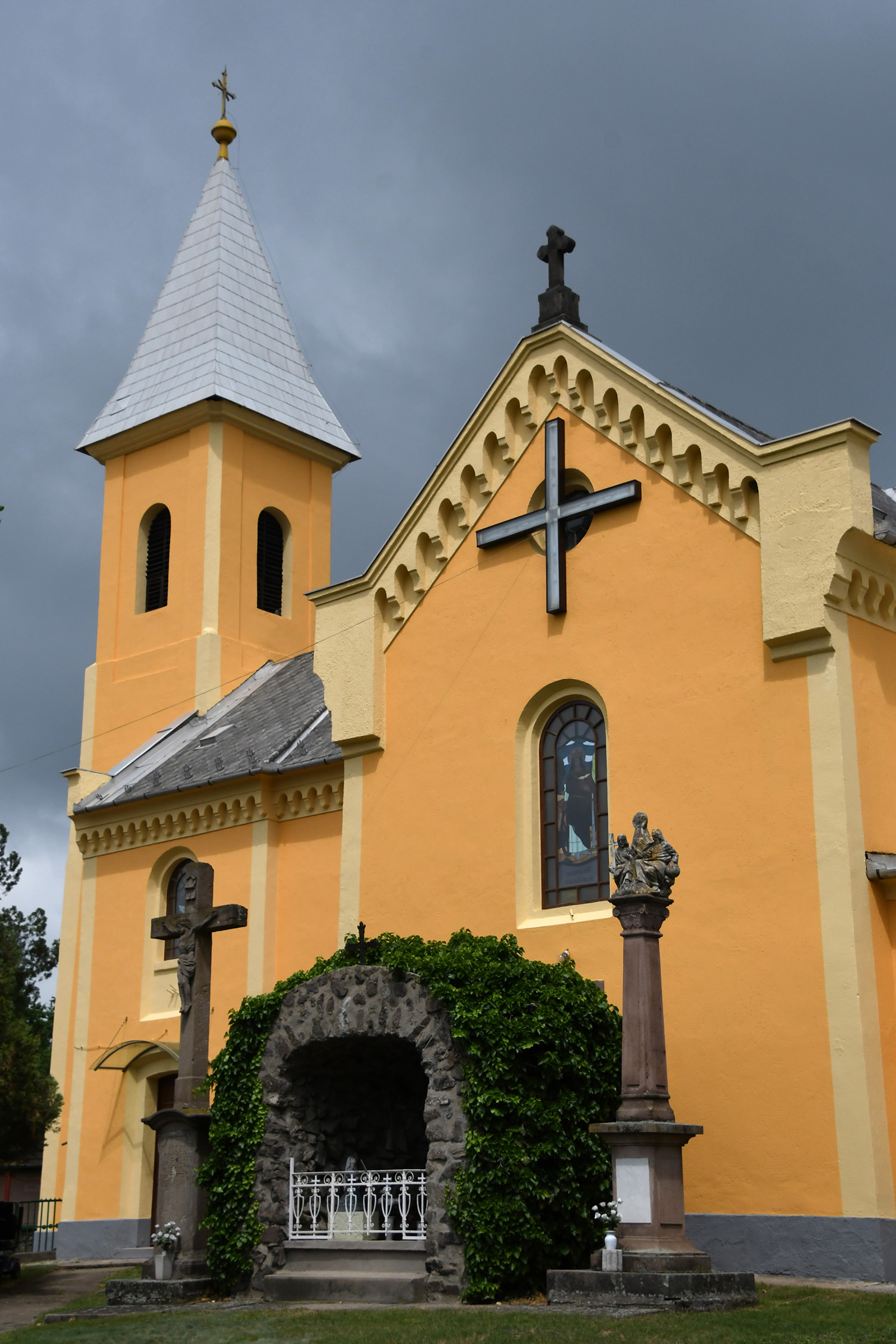
- St. Catherine of Alexandria Church

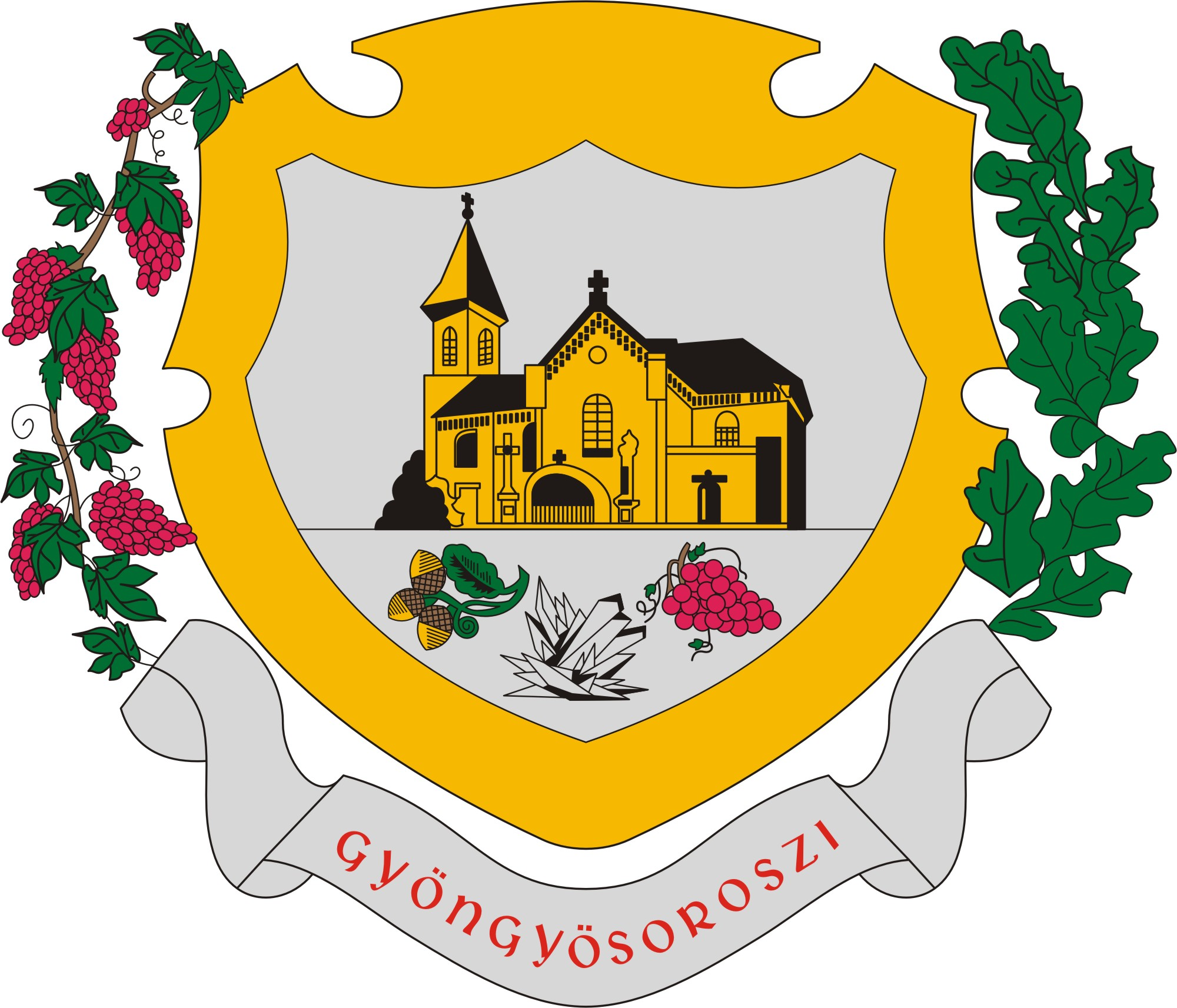
- Coat of arms

- Location in Hungary
- Coordinates: 47°49′34″N 19°53′38″E
- Country: Hungary
- County: Heves
- District: Gyöngyös
- First mentioned: 1209

Government
  - Mayor: Szilveszter Tóth (Fidesz–KDNP)

Area
  - Total: 21.39 km^{2} (8.26 sq mi)

Population (2022)
  - Total: 1,464
  - Density: 68.44/km^{2} (177.3/sq mi)
- Time zone: UTC+1 (CET)
  - Summer (DST): UTC+2 (CEST)
- Postal code: 3211
- Area code: 37
- Website: www.gyongyosoroszi.hu

Gyöngyösoroszi is a village in Heves County, Hungary, beside of the Toka creek, under the Mátra mountain ranges. As of 2022 census, it has a population of 1464 (see Demographics). The village located 6.7 km from (Nr. 85) Vámosgyörk–Gyöngyös railway line, 7.2 km from the main road 3 and 14.6 km from the M3 motorway. The closest train station with public transport in Gyöngyös.

== History ==
The earliest finds come from the Bronze Age, which indicate an inhabited area. Its first documented mention comes from 1209, when it is mentioned as Huruzi. Later, his name appears in the forms Huruz, Urus and Oros, as a property of the Aba gens. The papal tithe list mentions it as Orozi in 1332. In the 14th century it became the property of the Szinai, Lapispataki and Sennyei families, and in the 15th century it became the property of the Báthory family. The Turks destroyed the settlement and it was uninhabited in the middle of the 16th century. It came into the possession of the Földváry family and was populated again in the 17th century. It was owned by several noble families from the 18th century, and a new one was built in the Baroque style on the site of the destroyed medieval church. The village was destroyed by a flood in 1799. The economic life of Gyöngyösoroszi was shaped by mining from the 19th century. Zinc, lead and copper mining started at Károlytáró, north of the settlement, where a mining settlement created, what populated until today. In 1987, following the closure of the mine, the environmental damage assessment began. Remediation continues until today. In the area, mainly Arsenic, Cadmium, Copper, Lead, Zinc pollution was detected, which contaminates the soil and water.

== Demographics ==
According the 2022 census, 92.4% of the population were of Hungarian ethnicity, 4.9% were Gypsies, and 7.6% were did not wish to answer. The religious distribution was as follows: 31.8% Roman Catholic, 1.7% Calvinist, 29.5% non-denominational, and 33.8% did not wish to answer. The Gypsies have a local nationality government. 69 and 9 people live in Károlytáró and Ércelő mining communities 7.0 and 1.0 km away of the village and 2 people live in a farm.

Population by years:

Year	1870	1880	1890	1900	1910	1920	1930	1941
Population	836	846	871	948	1097	1147	1280	1326
Year	1949	1960	1970	1980	1990	2001	2011	2022
Population	1313	1607	1728	1640	1575	1615	1572	1464

== Politics ==
Mayors since 1990:

- 1990–2006: Mrs. Tibor Tóth (until 1994 FKGP, but after that independent)
- 2006–2019: Lívia Vernyihel (independent)
- 2019–: Szilveszter Tóth (until 2024 independent, but after that Fidesz–KDNP)
