= Gyepükaján =

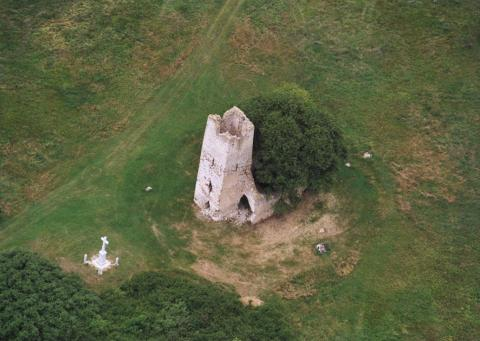
- Ruins of a medieval church near Gyepükaján

- Coat of arms

- Location of Veszprém county in Hungary

- Location of Gyepükaján
- Coordinates: 47.04354°N 17.32855°E
- Country: Hungary
- County: Veszprém

Area
  - Total: 9.11 km^{2} (3.52 sq mi)

Population (2004)
  - Total: 392
  - Density: 43.02/km^{2} (111.4/sq mi)
- Time zone: UTC+1 (CET)
  - Summer (DST): UTC+2 (CEST)
- Postal code: 8473
- Area code: 87

Gyepükaján is a village in Veszprém county, Hungary.
