= Gyöngyöstarján =

- Village
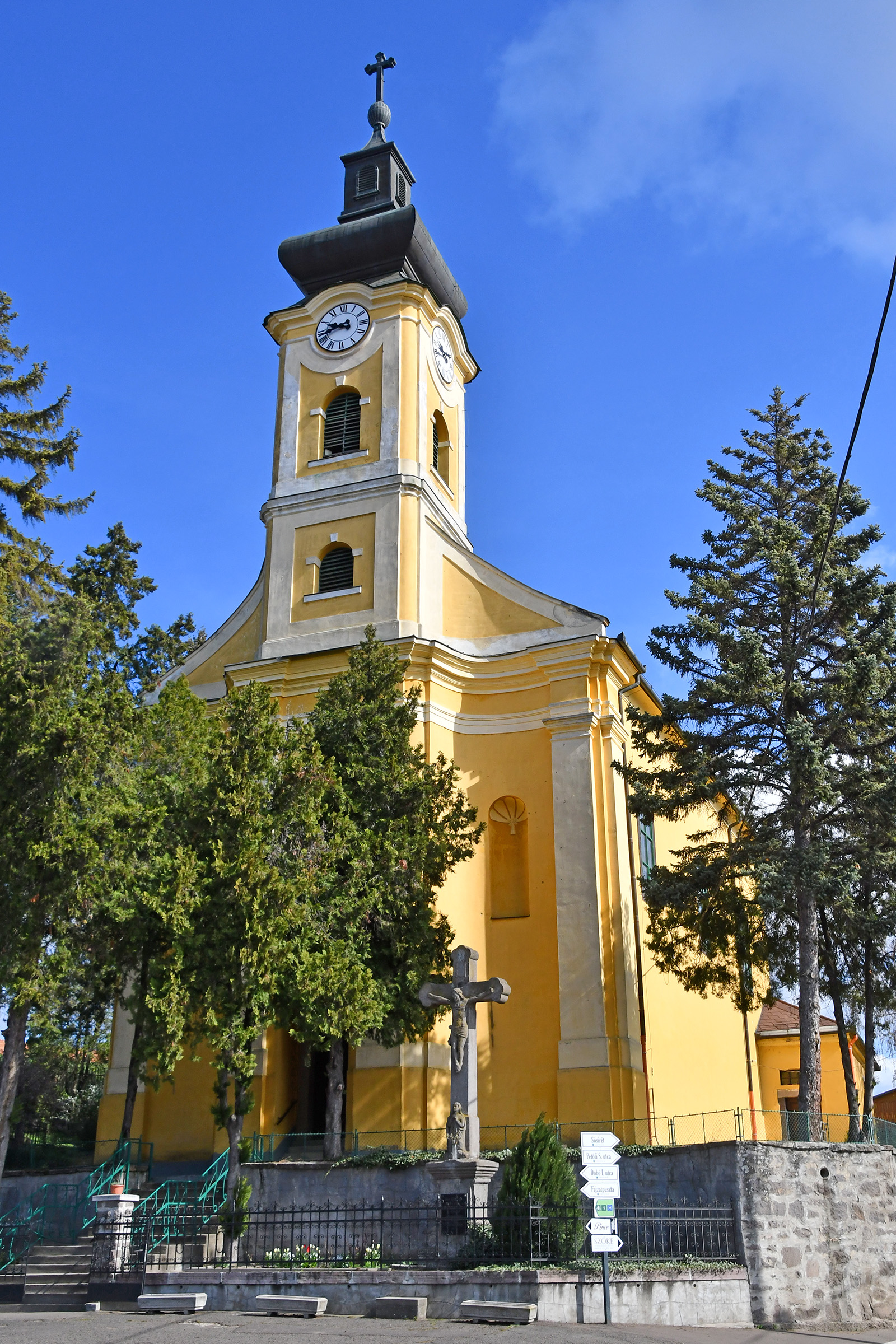
- All Saints' Church

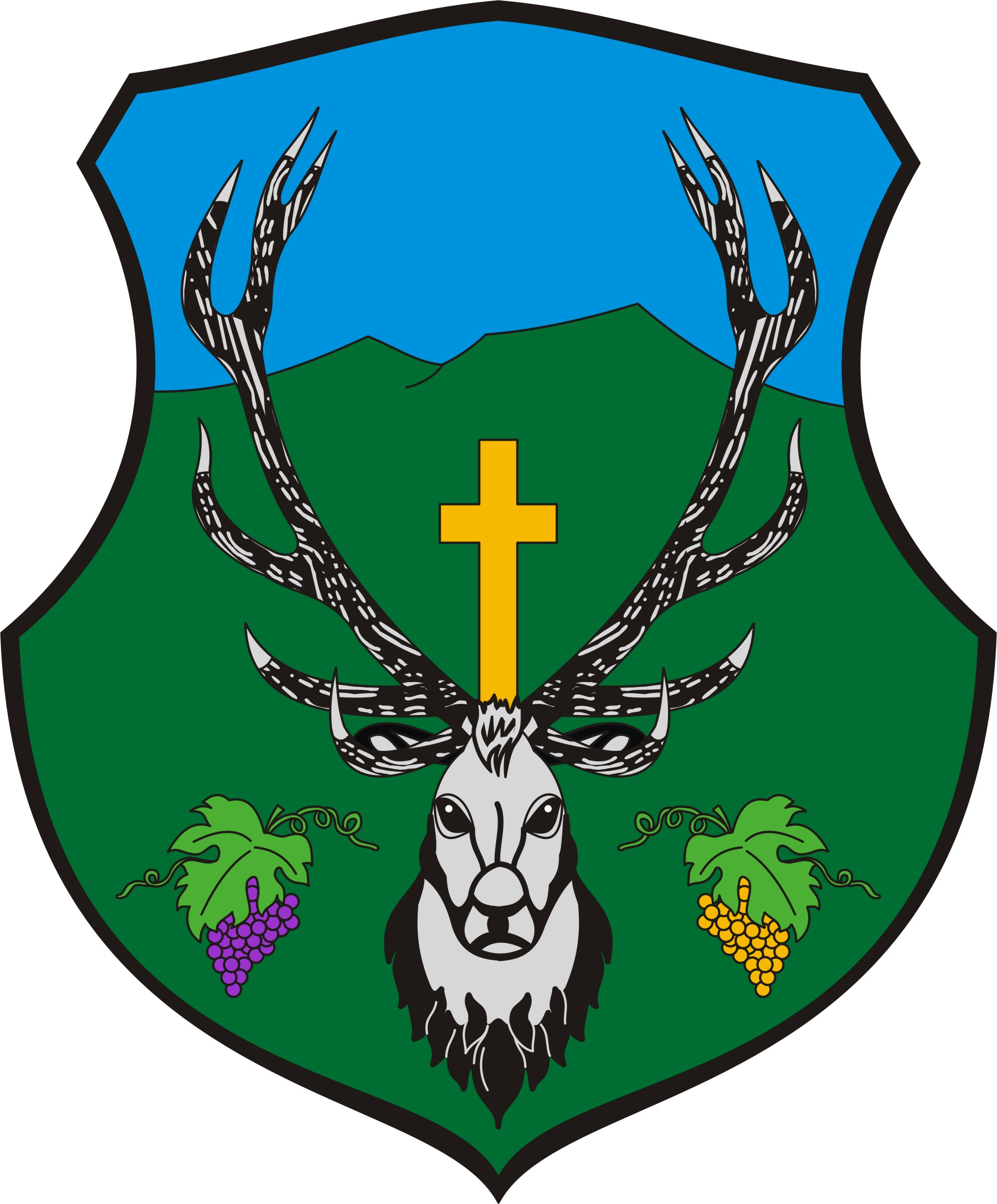
- Coat of arms

- Location in Hungary
- Coordinates: 47°48′47″N 19°52′02″E
- Country: Hungary
- County: Heves
- District: Gyöngyös
- First mentioned: 1275

Government
  - Mayor: Viktor Kiss (Ind.)

Area
  - Total: 46.39 km^{2} (17.91 sq mi)

Population (2022)
  - Total: 2,219
  - Density: 47.83/km^{2} (123.9/sq mi)
- Time zone: UTC+1 (CET)
  - Summer (DST): UTC+2 (CEST)
- Postal code: 3036
- Area code: 37
- Website: www.gyongyostarjan.hu

Gyöngyöstarján is a village in Heves County, Hungary, beside of the Tarján creek, under the Mátra mountain ranges. As of 2022 census, it has a population of 2219 (see Demographics). The village located 7.1 km from (Nr. 85) Vámosgyörk–Gyöngyös railway line, 7.5 km from the main road 3 and 15.0 km from the M3 motorway. The closest train station with public transport in Gyöngyös.

== History ==
The settlement was also inhabited in the Bronze Age, but its first written record dates back to 1275, when two settlements: Kistarján (Tharian Minor) and Nagyatarján (Tharian Maior) were formed by the sons of György Tarjáni. North of the settlement was still a castle at that time, in the place of which only stone ramparts remain today. From 1334 it was the property of Thomas Szécsényi, then in 1461, when the family died out, it was inherited by Albert Losonci and János Guthi Országh. The certificates mention it as a market town in 1570, but this title was later dropped by the settlement. The reference to the conversion of St. Hubertus first appeared on Gyöngyöstarján's 1571 seal, which can also be seen on today's coat of arms. At that time, 11 families lived in the settlement, but the village burned down in 1596. The village school began its operation with 170 students in 1660. Gyöngyöstarján became the property of Sámuel Haller after the Ottoman rule. In the 18th century, the Haller family built a baroque-style church and parish, as well as a 542-meter-long wine cellar. Wine production is still decisive in the life of the settlement. In the 19th century, the village belonged to the Forgách, Esterházy and Almásy families, at which time a lignite mine, a brick factory, a clay and sand mine, a quarry were established, and watermills along the streams. György Borhy built a hunting lodge north of the village in 1926, which is now an event center. Between 1961 and 1975, the settlement had its own cooperative, at which time the size of the wine production area was increased. In the 1970s, a community center, a kindergarten, a doctor's office, and a home for the elderly were built. In the 1980s, the school and the post office were built and the creeks were regulated. A bottling plant was established in 1984, which was destroyed in a fire after 1990. In the 1990s, department stores, a pharmacy and a sports field were built.

== Demographics ==
According the 2022 census, 91.9% of the population were of Hungarian ethnicity and 8.0% were did not wish to answer. The religious distribution was as follows: 47.8% Roman Catholic, 2.7% Calvinist, 0.7% Greek Catholic 8.7% non-denominational, and 37.1% did not wish to answer. 15 people live in a resting place 3.0 km far away the centre of the village.

Population by years:

Year	1870	1880	1890	1900	1910	1920	1930	1941
Population	1830	1816	1977	2157	2485	2640	2604	2738
Year	1949	1960	1970	1980	1990	2001	2011	2022
Population	2780	2878	2721	2591	2415	2537	2512	2219

== Politics ==
Mayors since 1990:

- 1990–2006: Péter Szamosvölgyi (independent)
- 2006–2019: Károly Mihály Nagy (independent)
- 2019–: Viktor Kiss (independent)
