= Atkár =

- Village (község)
- Coat of arms

- Location of Heves County in Hungary

- Location in Hungary
- Coordinates: 47°43′16″N 19°53′28″E
- Country: Hungary
- Region: Northern Hungary
- County: Heves County
- District: Gyöngyös

Government
  - Mayor: Attila Kocsis (Ind.)

Area
  - Total: 33.76 km^{2} (13.03 sq mi)

Population (2015)
  - Total: 1,715
  - Density: 50.80/km^{2} (131.6/sq mi)
- Time zone: UTC+1 (CET)
  - Summer (DST): UTC+2 (CEST)
- Postal code: 3213
- Area code: 37
- Website: http://www.atkar.hu/

Atkár is a village in Heves County, Hungary.
