= Ludas =

- Village (község)
- Location of Heves County in Hungary

- Location of Ludas in Hungary
- Coordinates: 47°43′55″N 20°05′28″E
- Country: Hungary
- Region: Northern Hungary
- County: Heves County
- Subregion: Gyöngyös District

Government
  - Mayor: Mónika Csengeri Vargáné

Area
  - Total: 10.79 km^{2} (4.17 sq mi)

Population (1 Jan. 2015)
  - Total: 736
  - Density: 67.84/km^{2} (175.7/sq mi)
- Time zone: UTC+1 (CET)
  - Summer (DST): UTC+2 (CEST)
- Postal code: 3274
- Area code: 37
- Website: www.ludas.hu

Ludas is a village in Heves County, Northern Hungary Region, Hungary.

== Communications ==
Ludas is 1 kilometre (0.62 mi) both from Road 3 and the Budapest-Miskolc railway line. The M3 motorway, built in 1998, bypasses the settlement at a distance of 3 kilometres (2 mi) and has reduced traffic congestion.

== Sights to visit ==
- church (1794)
- Taródy palace (c. 1780)
