= Folk museum =

Museum that deals with folk culture and heritage

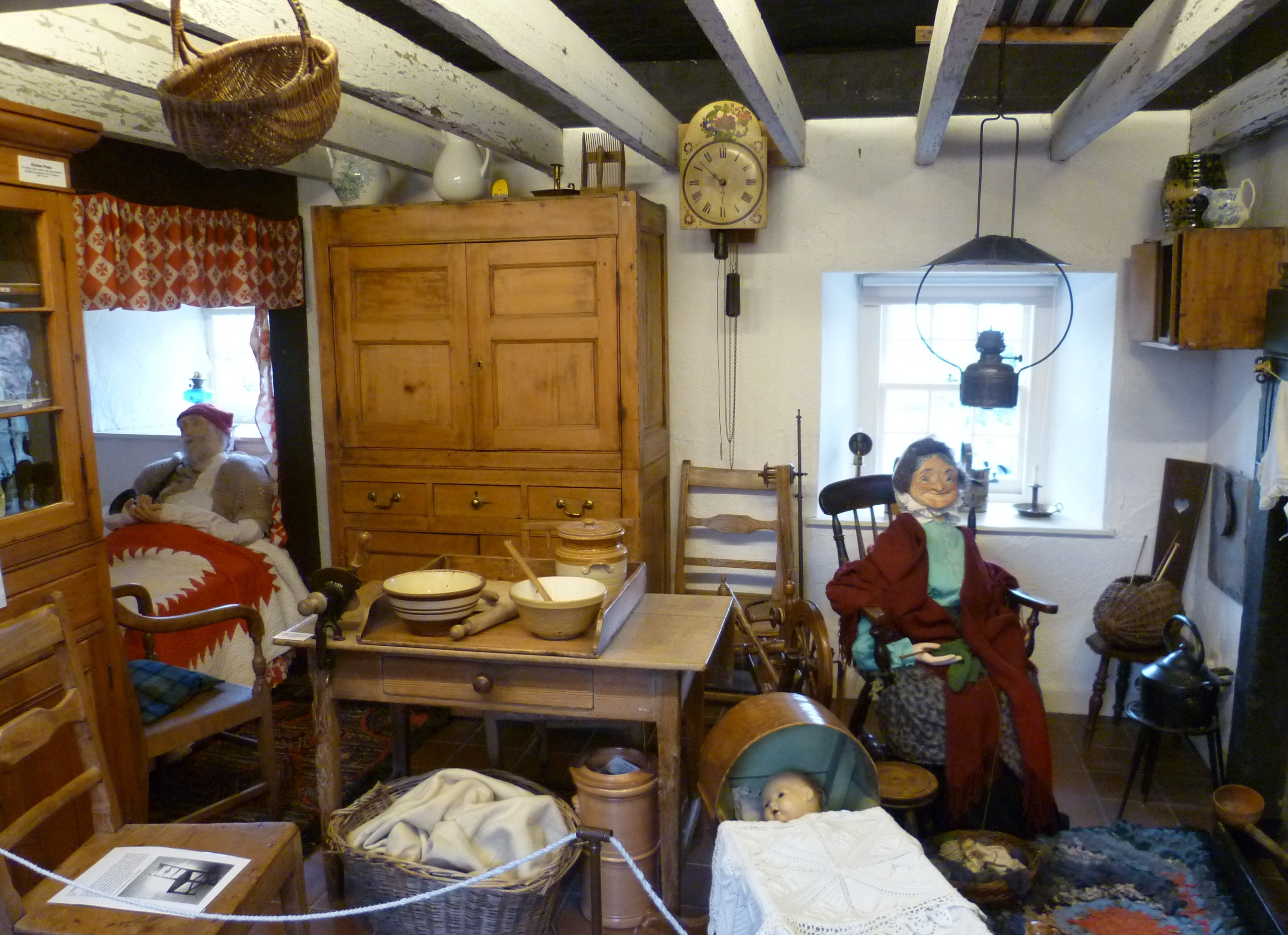
Fife Folk Museum exhibit.

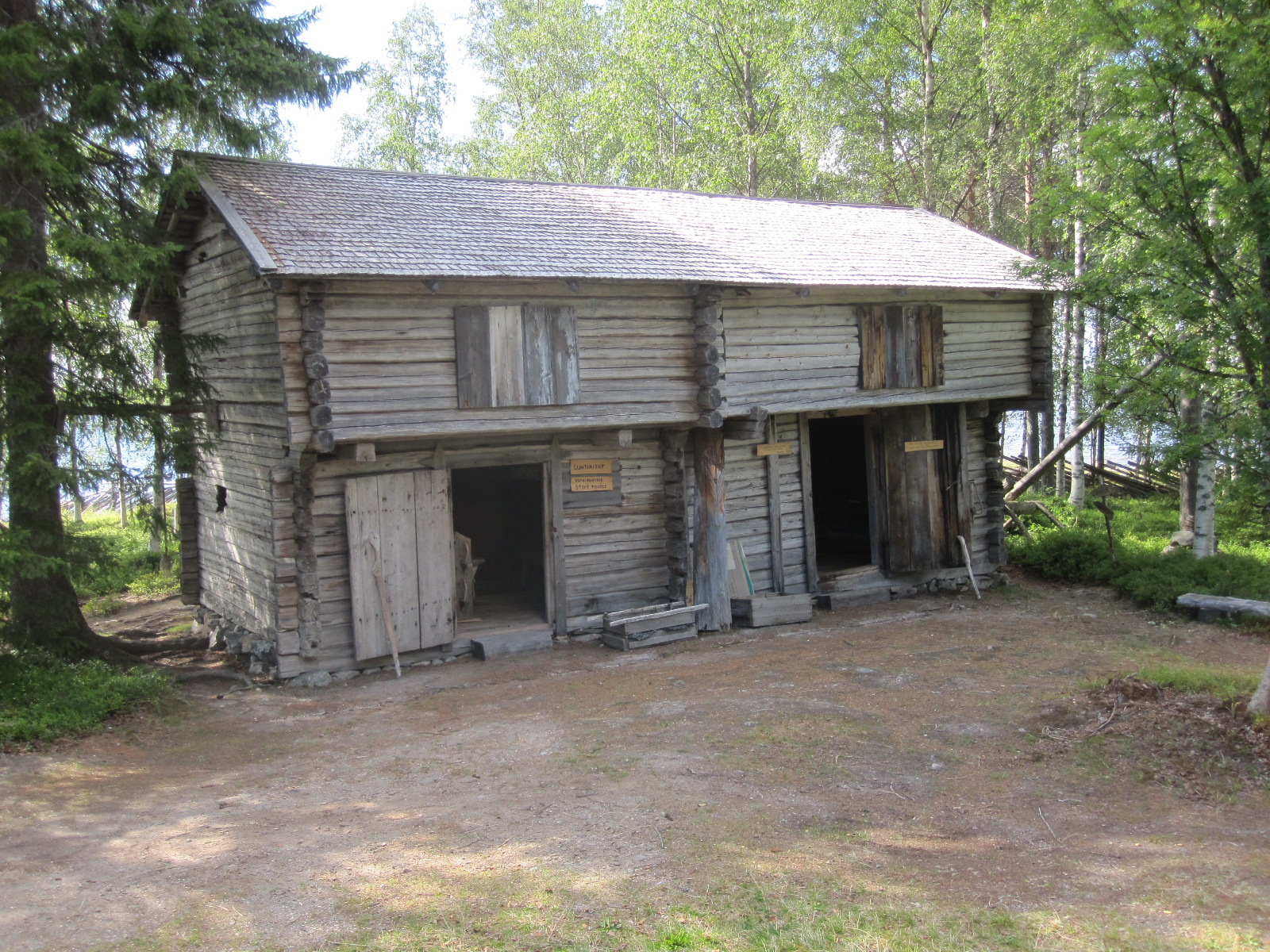
A local museum in Suomussalmi

A folk museum is a museum that deals with folk culture and heritage. Such museums cover local life in rural communities. A folk museum typically displays historical objects that were used as part of the people's everyday lives. Examples of such objects include clothes and tools. Many folk museums are also open-air museums and some cover rural history.

== History ==
The concept of open-air museums originated in Scandinavia in the late 19th century. The Swedish folklorist Artur Hazelius founded what was to become the Nordic Museum in 1873 to house an ethnographic collection of peasant furniture, clothes, tools, toys and other objects. He later set up the open-air museum Skansen in Stockholm in 1891, where he erected about 150 houses and farmsteads from all over Sweden, transporting them piece by piece and rebuilding them to provide a unique picture of traditional Sweden. Skansen became a model for other open-air establishments in Northern Europe.

== Examples ==
The National Folk Museum of Korea was established in 1945 and provides a history of the Korean people from prehistory to the early 20th century, with over 98,000 artefacts housed in three main exhibition halls. It includes open-air exhibits, such as replicas of typical village structures, grinding mills, huts for rice storage, and pits where kimchi pots were stored over winter.

Among the most notable folk museums are:

- Craft and Folk Art Museum, on Wilshire Boulevard in Los Angeles, California, now also known as "Craft Contemporary"
- Abby Aldrich Rockefeller Folk Art Museum, adjacent to historic Williamsburg, Virginia, asserted to be the earliest-opened still-operating museum of American folk art

== See also ==
- Local museum
- Open-air museum
