= Gyöngyössolymos =

- Village
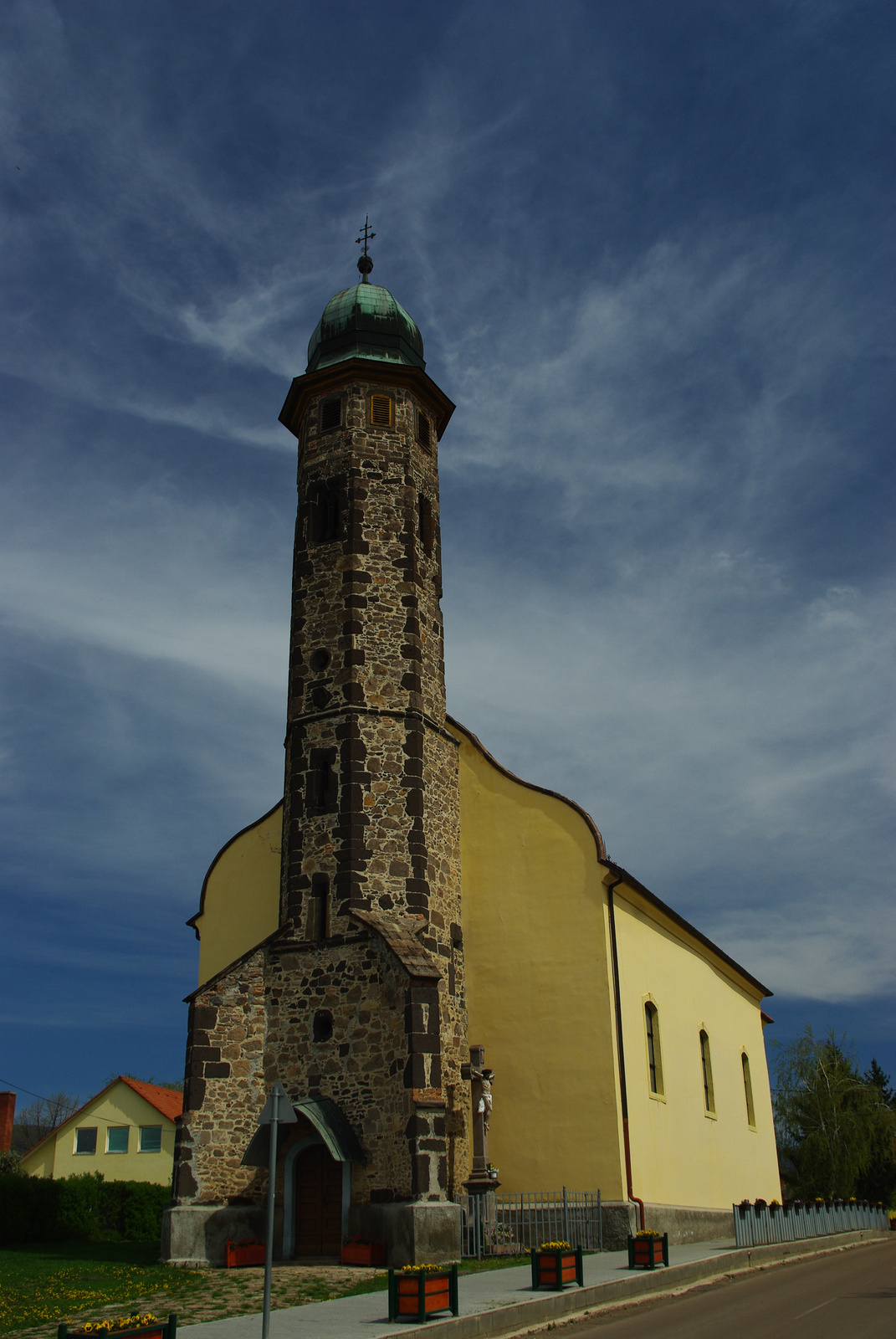
- Saint Nicholas Church

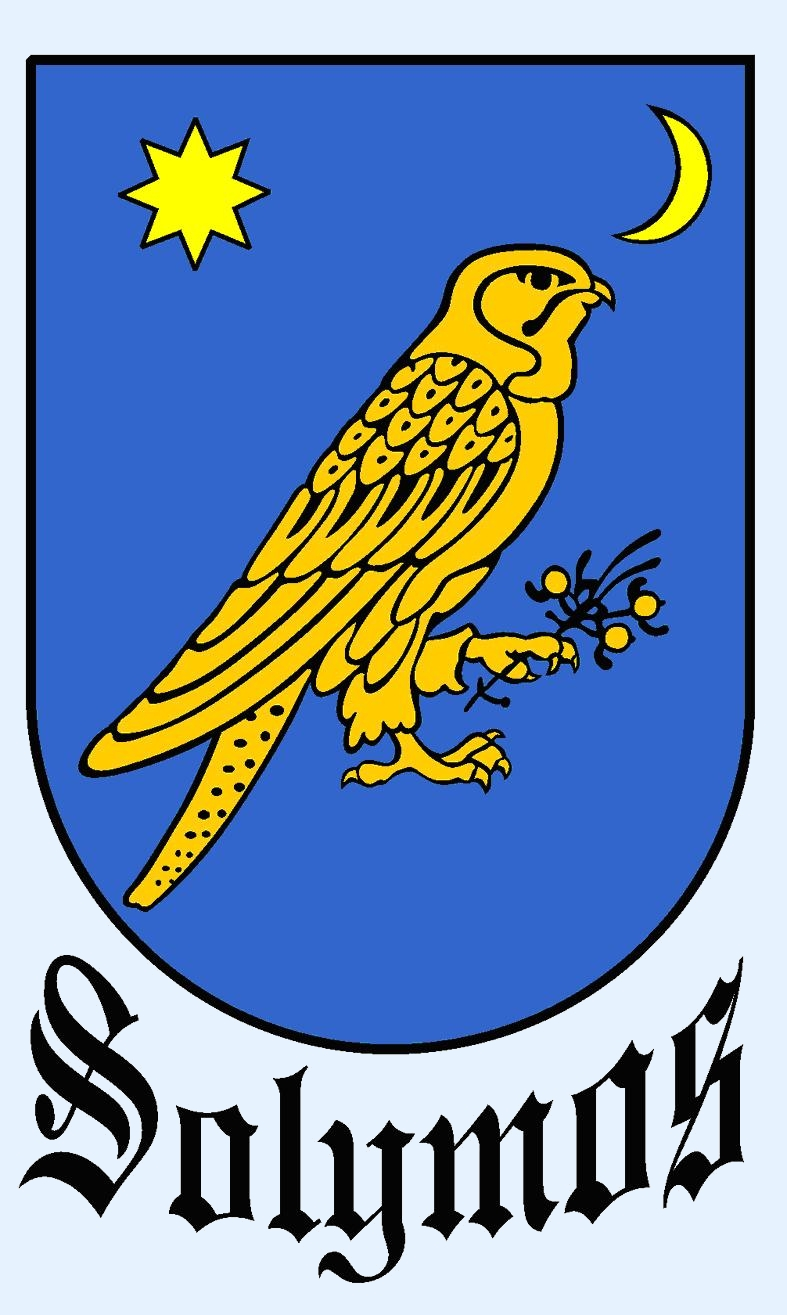
- Coat of arms

- Location in Hungary
- Coordinates: 47°49′06″N 19°55′54″E
- Country: Hungary
- County: Heves
- District: Gyöngyös
- First mentioned: 1212

Government
  - Mayor: Gyula Zsolt Szolcsák (Ind.)

Area
  - Total: 64.85 km^{2} (25.04 sq mi)

Population (2022)
  - Total: 2,820
  - Density: 43.5/km^{2} (113/sq mi)
- Time zone: UTC+1 (CET)
  - Summer (DST): UTC+2 (CEST)
- Postal code: 3231
- Area code: 37
- Website: www.gyongyossolymos.hu

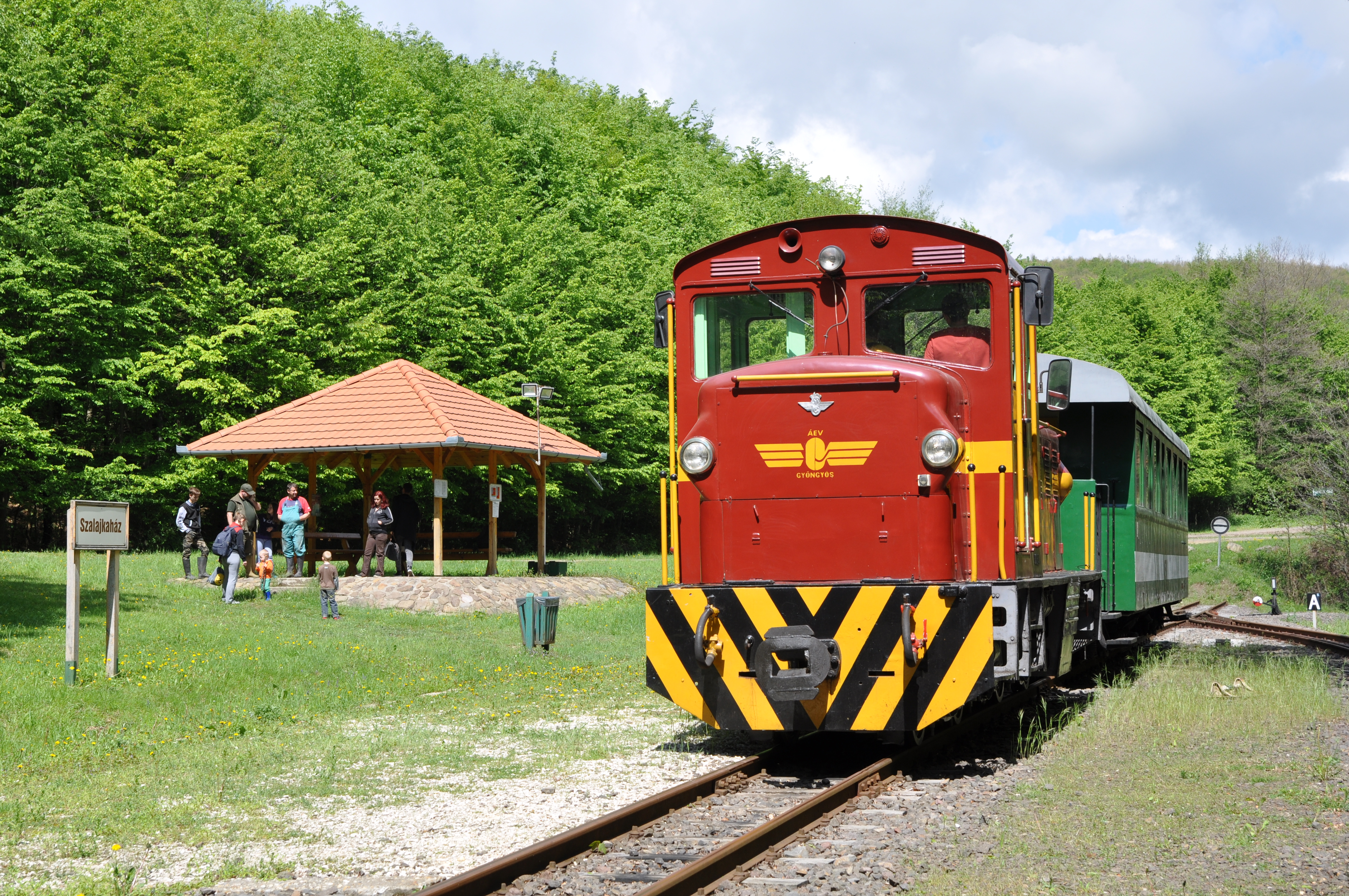
Szalajka House railway station

Gyöngyössolymos is a village in Heves County, Hungary, beside of the Gyöngyös creek, under the Mátra mountain ranges. As of 2022 census, it has a population of 2820 (see Demographics). The village located 4.6 km from (Nr. 85) Vámosgyörk–Gyöngyös railway line, 5.2 km from the main road 3 and 12.1 km from the M3 motorway. The closest train station with public transport in Gyöngyös on standard-gauge railway, but the Gyöngyös State Forest Railway's narrow gauge railway line also going across the village.

== History ==
Based on archaeological findings, the area was already inhabited in the Bronze Age. The first written mention of it dates from 1212, when King Andrew II donated an estate in the village to the Knights of the Holy Sepulchre. The settlement was owned by the Solymosy family, which built the settlement's church in the 14th century. The sources refer to the settlement as Solomus, Sumus, Solimus. A certificate from 1320 mentions the Dezsővár built by Dezső Solymosy north of the village, the ruins of which have not survived. The church was rebuilt in the Baroque style between 1769 and 1772, and its furnishings are in the Classicist style of the 19th century. The economic life of the village was determined by the mill industry from the 18th century, a watermill in the basement, which is now a museum, preserves the memory of this. Increased forestry activity justified the construction of the first narrow-gauge railway line to the Nagy valley in 1906, and the connecting line with Gyöngyös was built in 1918. Most of the lines were dismantled after 1968, and now only one line remains, which leads to the Szalajka House and operates for tourist purposes. A wildlife showing place, a spring and an educational trail have been established around the house. The Szalajka House was a former glass huta 8,7 km far from the village by railway and 4,1 km far from Mátraszentimre on marked hiking trail.

== Demographics ==
According the 2022 census, 91.5% of the population were of Hungarian ethnicity, 0.7% were Germans, and 8.1% were did not wish to answer. The religious distribution was as follows: 40.1% Roman Catholic, 3.4% Calvinist, 0.6% Greek Catholic, 10.1% non-denominational, and 42.4% did not wish to answer. 12 people live in an outskirt 1.0 km away of the village.

Population by years:

Year	1870	1880	1890	1900	1910	1920	1930	1941
Population	1678	1730	2040	2150	2362	2515	2747	3334
Year	1949	1960	1970	1980	1990	2001	2011	2022
Population	3234	3123	3051	3022	3203	3212	2988	2820

== Politics ==
Mayors since 1990:

- 1990–2006: László Lukács (independent)
- 2006–2014: Gyula Zsolt Szolcsák (independent)
- 2014–2019: Zsuzsanna Nádudvari, Mrs. Nyilas (independent)
- 2019–2024: Miklós Asztalos (independent)
- 2024: Gyula Zsolt Szolcsák (independent)
