= József Balázs =

József Balázs may refer to:

- József Balázs (footballer)
- József Balázs (politician)
