= Visontai =

Visontai is a surname. Notable people with the surname include:

- András Visontai (born 1979), Hungarian ice dancer
- Soma Visontai (1854–1925), Hungarian lawyer
