= Gyöngyös State Forest Railway =

Railway line in Hungary

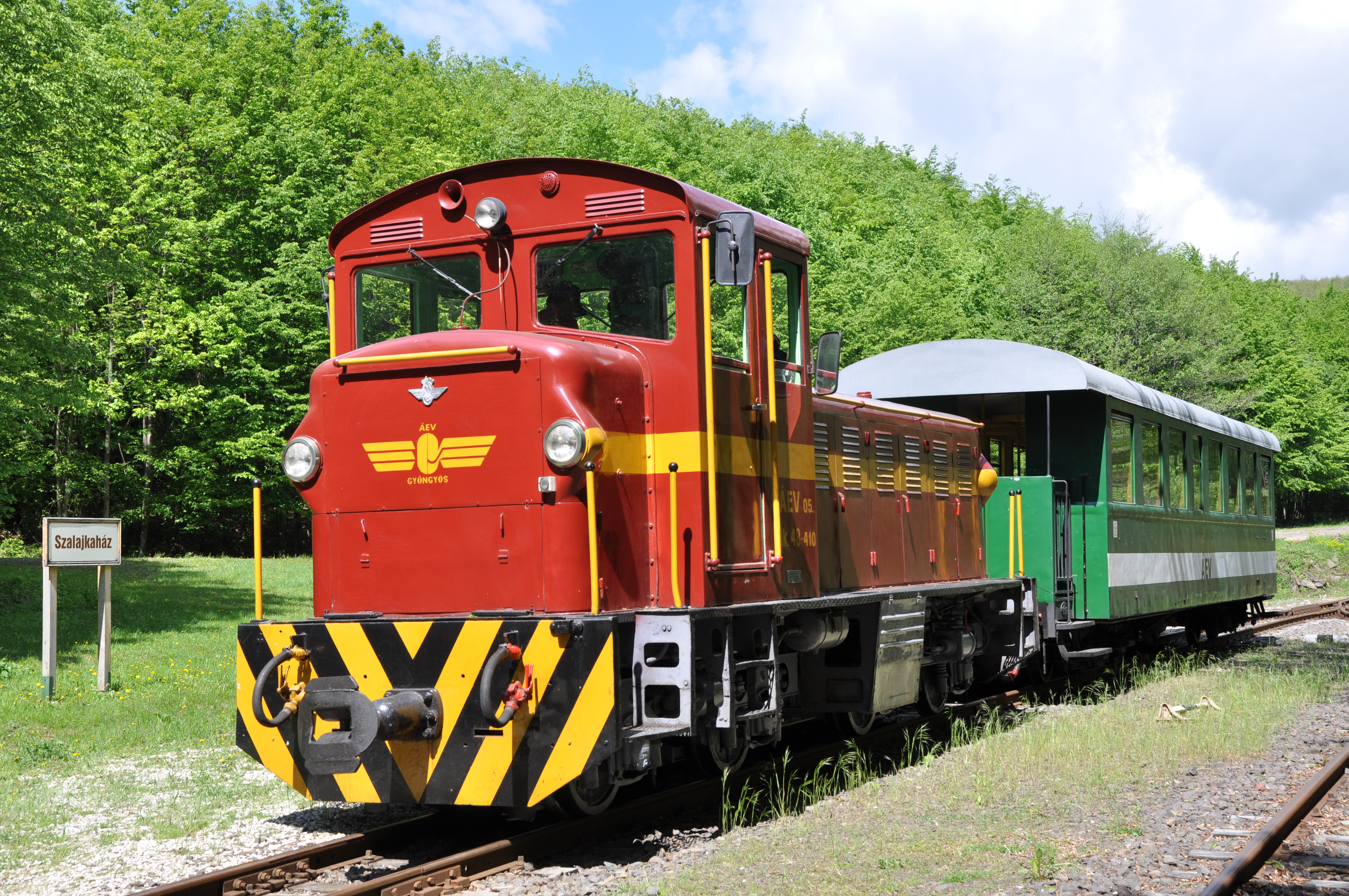
- Szalajkaház station

Overview
- Native name: Mátravasút
- Status: active
- Owner: Egererdő Zrt
- Locale: Gyöngyös
- Coordinates: 47°47′03″N 19°56′01″E
- Termini: Gyöngyös; Mátrafüred, Szalajkaház
- Stations: 7
- Website: www.matrahegy.hu

Service
- Type: tourism purpose
- Services: 2
- Route number: 324 & 325
- Depot: Gyöngyös
- Rolling stock: 5 locomotives & 12 carriages

History
- Opened: 19 June 1926
- Constructions: 1906 (Gyöngyössolymos - Lajosháza), 1911 (Gyöngyös - Farkasmály), 1914 (Lajosháza - Szalajkaház), 1918 (Gyöngyös - Gyöngyössolymos), 1923 (Farkasmály - Mátrafüred)
- Openings: 1926 (Gyöngyös - Mátrafüred), 1958 (Gyöngyös - Gyöngyössolymos), 1968 (Gyöngyössolymos - Lajosháza), 2009 (Lajosháza - Szalajkaház)

Technical
- Line length: 19.4 km (12.1 mi)
- Track length: 18.6 km (11.6 mi)
- Number of tracks: 2
- Character: forest railway
- Track gauge: 760 mm (2 ft 5 15/16 in)
- Old gauge: 600 mm (1 ft 11 5/8 in)
- Minimum radius: 35 metres (114.8 feet)
- Operating speed: max. 20 km/h (12.4 mph)
- Highest elevation: 39,5 ‰

The Gyöngyös State Forest Railway (Hungarian: Gyöngyösi Állami Erdei Vasút) is a 760 mm (2 ft 5 15/16 in) narrow gauge railway in Hungary. It is operated by Egererdő Zrt, who also operate the Felsőtárkány National Forest Railway and the Szilvásvárad Forest Railway. The railway is also referred to as Mátravasút (Mátra Railway). The travel last recently 22 minutes to Mátrafüred and 50 minutes to Szalajkaház from Gyöngyös. The railway operates from March to October mostly on weekends, but in the summer time every day. It is connected to the MÁV system: in Gyöngyös the normal gauge railway station is situated 350 m far from the forest railway terminus.

== History ==
The first railway line was built by the Gábor Barna and Sons parquet factory in 1906 from the north border of Gyöngyössolymos in the Nagy valley. They constructed other lines in the Csukás and Monostor valley in 1907, and in the Cseternás and Szén valley in 1914. That means the Gyöngyössolymos - Lajosháza section of the present railway built in 1906 and the Lajosháza - Szalajkaház section in 1914. The Holzer and Czier Company built the railway line between the MÁV station and the stone mine of Farkasmály in 1911. The connection of the two railway line birth in 1918, when the parquett factory in Gyöngyös gained direct connection with Gyöngyössolymos. After the Treaty of Trianon growed the tourist importance of the Mátra mountain and the town of Gyöngyös wanted a new tourist attraction. The town built a new industrial line from Farkasmály across Mátrafüred into the Csatorna valley in 1923. The railway opened for passengers on 19 June 1926 between Gyöngyös and Mátrafüred, it is called Mátra Railway. The present terminus in Gyöngyös opened in 1928. The whole railway network original used 600 mm narrow gauge, what was replaced in 1925 by 760 mm narrow gauge. The entire railway network was nationalized after the World War II. The State Forestry would be the new owner and the network gained it present name. The railway line, damaged in World War II, was dismantled in the Csatorna valley. In Mátrafüred a new industrial railway line was built to the tool and equipment factory in 1951. The railway opened for passengers between Gyöngyös and Gyöngyössolymos in 1958.

The pioneer railway was founded in 1961, which took over the passenger transport between Gyöngyös and Mátrafüred, and then from 1968 the entire passenger transport. The pioneers made two camps in Mátrafüred and Lajosháza, what resulted the passenger transport started from Gyöngyössolymos and Lajosháza in 1968. In line with the Transport Policy Concept of 1968, freight traffic was abolished between 1969 and 1971 and the closed railway lines were destroyed. After 1987 the remaining two railway lines operate by the state forestry again. After in 2005 a flood destroyed the railway that led to Lajosháza, it was restored in 2007. It followed by the rebuilt of the line in the Szén valley to Szalajkaház in 2008, that reopened in 2009. The newly rebuilt railway section was destroyed in 2011 by a flood, what caused an other restoration and the line reopened again in 2012. The continuation of the railway restoration in the Csukás valley to the Blokkház were a possibility in the 2010's, because it only 2 km close to Mátraszentimre.

== Locomotives ==
| Identity | Type | Builder | Year built | Notes |
|---|---|---|---|---|
| C50-404 | C50 | MÁV Északi | 1954 | In Gyöngyös since 1962 |
| 8244 409-9 (Mk48 2034) | Mk48 | Rába | 1961 | In Gyöngyös since 1976 |
| 8244 410-7 (Mk48 2035) | Mk48 | Rába | 1961 | In Gyöngyös since 1976 |
| 8244 412-3 (Mk48 2032) | Mk48 | Rába | 1961 | In Gyöngyös since 1980 |
| 490' 2005 | 490-2 | UCMR | 1954 | In Gyöngyös since 2006 |
