= Gyöngyös =

- Town
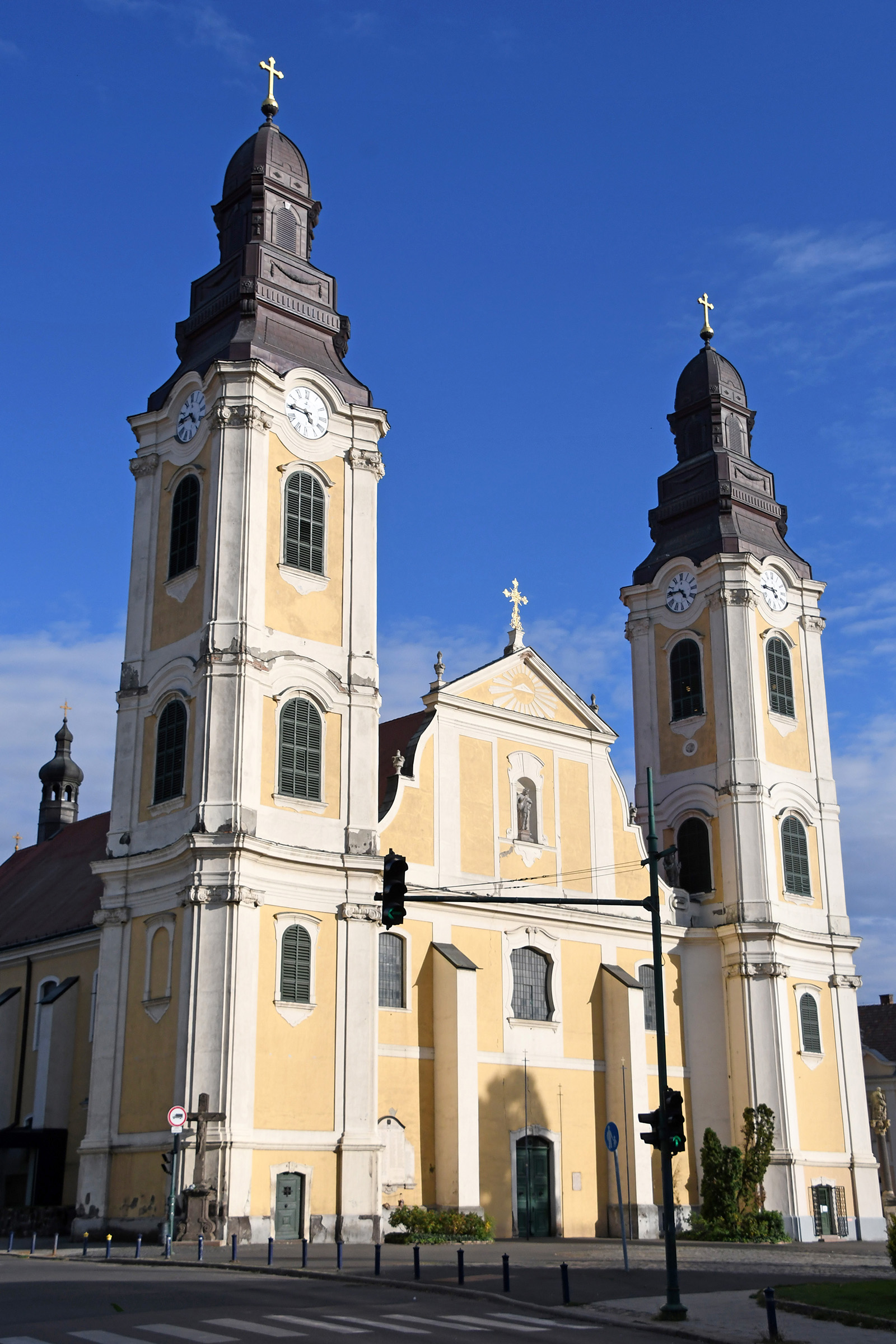
- Saint Bartholomew Church

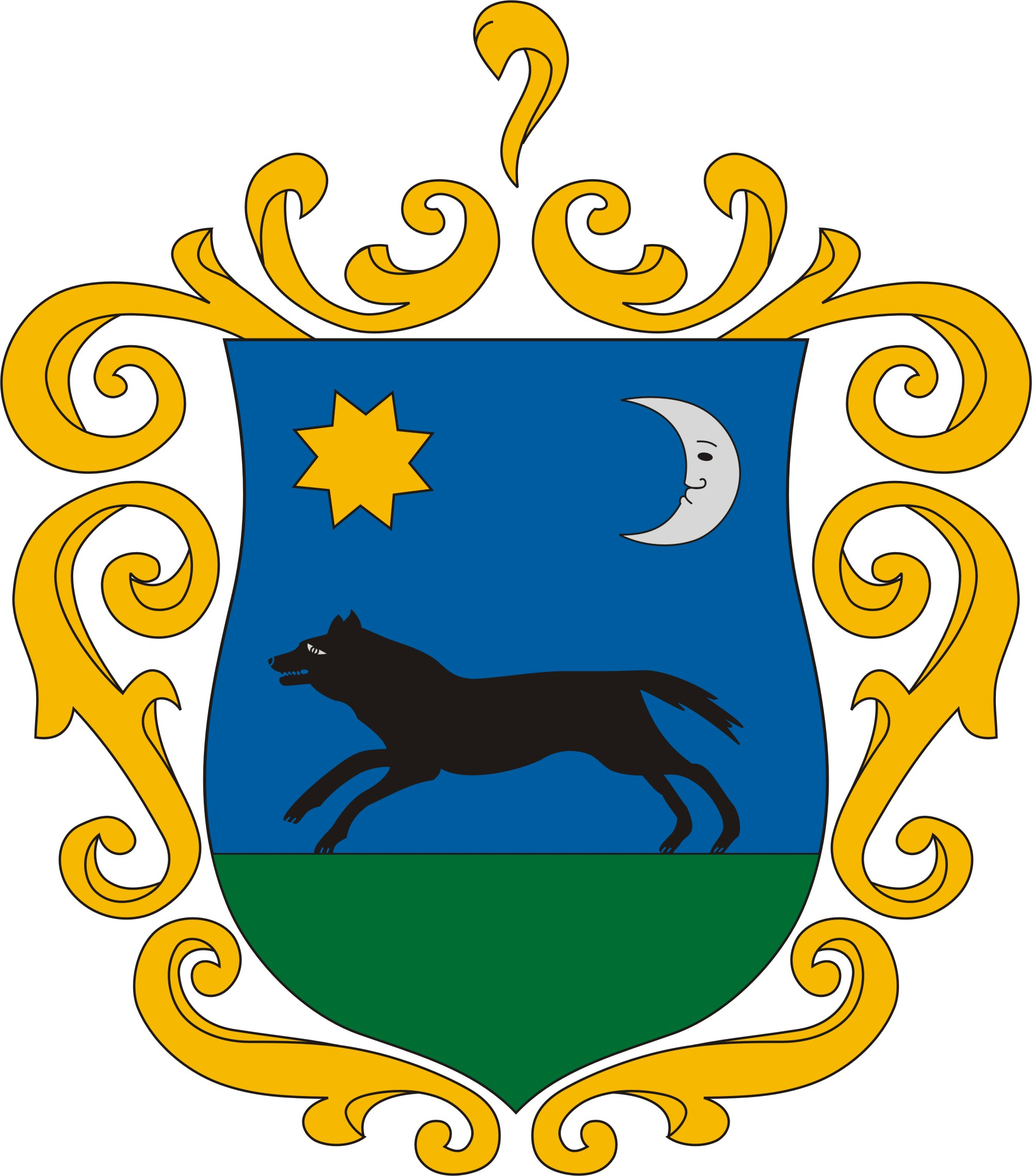
- Flag Coat of arms

- Location in Hungary
- Coordinates: 47°47′07″N 19°55′32″E
- Country: Hungary
- County: Heves
- District: Gyöngyös
- First mentioned: 1261

Government
  - Mayor: Péter Szókovács (Fidesz–KDNP)

Area
  - Total: 54.69 km^{2} (21.12 sq mi)

Population (2022)
  - Total: 27,957
  - Density: 511.2/km^{2} (1,324/sq mi)
- Time zone: UTC+1 (CET)
  - Summer (DST): UTC+2 (CEST)
- Postal code: 3200, 3221, 3232, 3233
- Area code: 37
- Website: gyongyos.hu

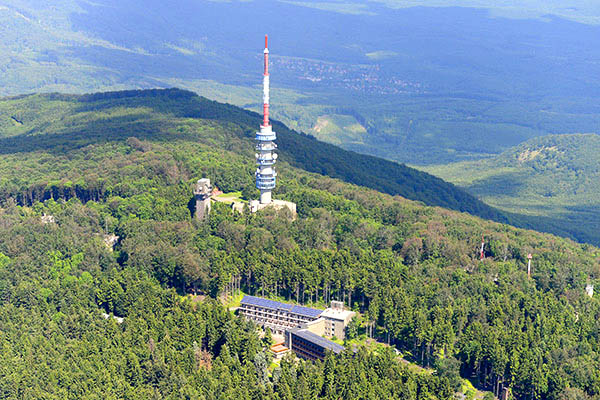
TV Tower on the Kékes

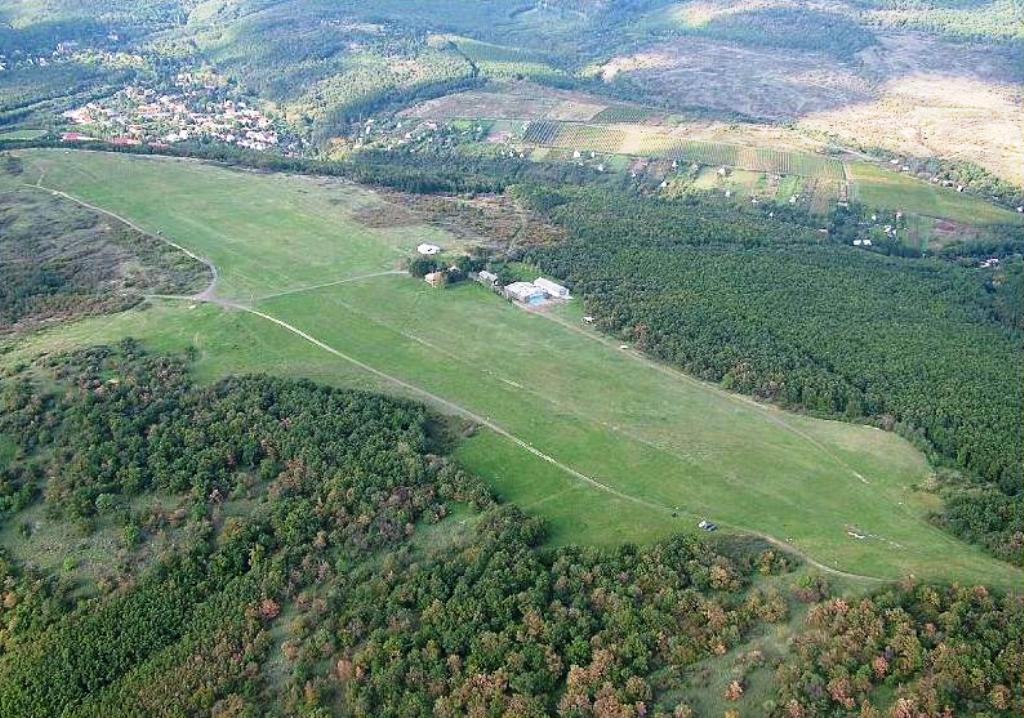
Gyöngyös Airport (LHGY)

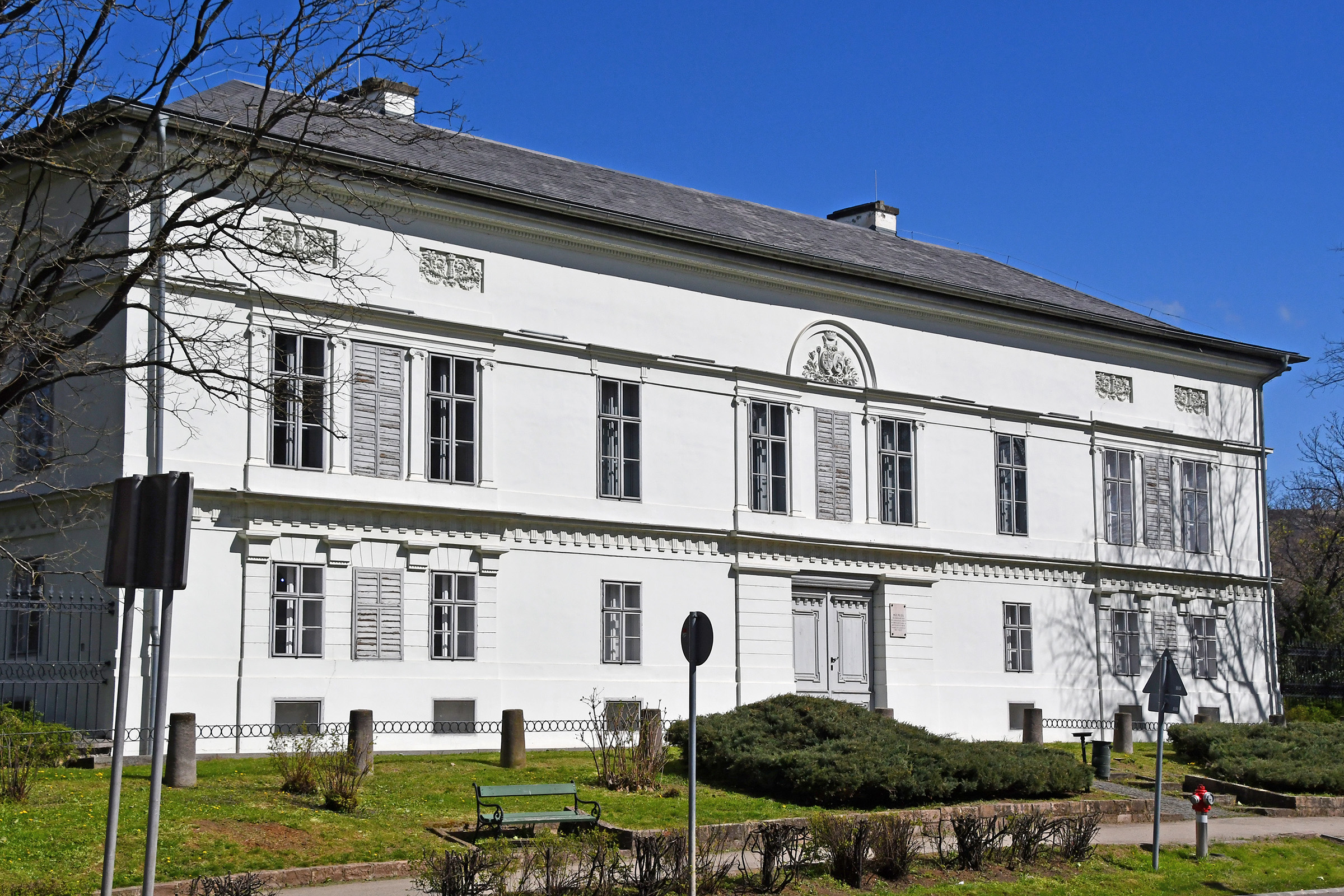
Mátra Museum (former Orczy castle)

Gyöngyös is a town in Heves County, Hungary, beside of the Gyöngyös creek, under the Mátra mountain ranges. As of 2022 census, it has a population of 27,957 (see Demographics). The town is located 8.4 km from the M3 motorway and 80.8 km from Budapest. Gyöngyös is terminus of the (Nr. 85) Vámosgyörk–Gyöngyös railway line and the main road 3 lead across the town. Gyöngyös have a train station and a stop on the standard-gauge railway line and the two narrow-gauge railway lines of the Gyöngyös State Forest Railway also start from here to the mountains for tourist purposes.

== History ==
The settlement got its name from the stream that crosses the town, which may refer to the mistletoe that often occurs on the waterfront, or to the pearly water. According to one theory, one of Árpád's daughters was Gyöngyös, who was buried here. From the 11th to the 14th century, the area belonged to the Aba family. It is mentioned for the first time in documents in 1261 as Gyngus. King Charles I donated the town and its countryside to Thomas Szécsényi in 1327, and raised it to the rank of market town in 1334. The city is located at the junction of trade routes, on the border of the lowlands and the uplands, so trade and industry also played an important role in addition to viticulture. The first church in the town is the Romanesque St. Bartholomew's Church, which was rebuilt in the Gothic style in the 15th century. The Franciscans arrived in Gyöngyös in the 14th century, and their church was also built in the Gothic style. After the Ottoman conquest in the 16th century, the town became khas town. The Jesuits established a gymnasium in 1634 with the permission of the Bey of Hatvan. Due to the increase in the number of Balkan merchants settling in the 17th century, the proportion of Orthodox people increased. Duke Francis Rákóczi negotiated about peace with Pál Széchényi, Archbishop of Kalocsa in Gyöngyös in 1704, summarizing his demands in 25 points. The general of the insurgents, János Bottyán, was buried in the Franciscan church in 1709.

The Baroque style became dominant in the 18th century: the St. Bartholomew Church, the Franciscan Church and Monastery were rebuilt, the St. Urban Church, the Orthodox St. Nicholas Church and, the St. John of Nepomuk Chapel with its triangular layout on the banks of the Gyöngyös creek were built in 1736. The building of the Jesuit gymnasium was built next to the church of St. Bartholomew in 1751-52, which was taken over by the Franciscans in 1773. The castle of the Orczy family was rebuilt in classicist style by Lőrinc Orczy in 1824, and the new building of the state gymnasium was built opposite it in 1899, and a music school operates in the old one. Financial institutions became important in addition to handicrafts and grape production in the 19th century. The economic role of the Jews was strengthened, and they built several synagogues. At the same time, the phylloxera epidemic dealt a significant blow to grape production.

Gyöngyös was destroyed by fire on May 21, 1917. 580 houses burned down, 40% of the population became homeless. Two days later, King Charles IV and Queen Zita visited the city. Due to changes in the country's border after 1920, the Mátra's tourist importance increased. The mayor of the town at the time, Árpád Puky, primarily supported the development of Mátrafüred, so in 1926 the town built a narrow-gauge railway line to Mátrafüred for tourist purposes, which was classified as a resort in 1935. On the Pipis hill created a grass airport (ICAO: LHGY) for gliding in 1931, what is the highest airport (350 m) in Hungary. A new synagogue built up in 1930, but in the summer of 1944, the town's Jewish population of 2,000 was deported and most of them murdered. After 1945, several housing estates and a 20-story residential tower were built, and the town's population doubled. The narrow-gauge railway also started passenger transport in the direction of Gyöngyössolymos. The Mátra Museum was opened in the former castle of the Orczy family, with a natural science and hunting exhibition. An other exhibition was opened in the former house of the Almásy family from the treasury of the St. Bartholomew church, which also includes 43 pieces of goldsmith's work from the 15th and 16th centuries. The Gyöngyösi KK handball team founded in 1975. The local campus of Agricultural University was built after 1980. The industrial park established in 2000 provides the largest number of jobs nowadays. It is home to many food factory, including dairy and sausage factories.

== Demographics ==
According the 2022 census, 88.3% of the population were of Hungarian ethnicity, 2.9% were Gypsies, 0.7% were Ukrainians, and 10.9% were did not wish to answer. The religious distribution was as follows: 34.7% Roman Catholic, 3.4% Calvinist, 14.2% non-denominational, and 43.9% did not wish to answer. The Gypsies and the Ruthenians have a local nationality government. 844 people live in Mátrafüred, 80 live in Mátraháza and 14 live in Kékestető other inner areas, furthermore 56 people live in 6 other outskirts. Mátrafüred (3232), Mátraháza (3233) and Kékestető (3221) have a postal code.

Population by years:

Year	1870	1880	1890	1900	1910	1920	1930	1941
Population	16,622	16,843	16,950	17,301	19,422	19,647	21,213	24,053
Year	1949	1960	1970	1980	1990	2001	2011	2022
Population	21,969	28,573	30,306	36,282	36,404	32,975	30,728	27,957

== Politics ==
Mayors since 1990:

- 1990–1994: György Keresztes (KDNP)
- 1994–2002: Gyula Szabó (MSZP, after 1998 supported by the SZDSZ too)
- 2002–2010: György Hiesz (MSZP, until 2006 supported by the SZDSZ too)
- 2010–2014: László Faragó (Fidesz–KDNP)
- 2014–2024: György Hiesz (MSZP-DK,until 2019 supported by the Együtt, after 2019 supported by the Momentum too)
- 2024–: Péter Szókovács (Fidesz–KDNP)

== Notable people ==
- Pál Vay (1735–1800), field marshal
- János Hám (1781–1857), Bishop of Szatmár
- Pál Bugát (1793–1865), doctor and linguistican
- Sándor Vachott (1818–1861), poet, brother of Imre Vahot
- Pál Almásy (1818–1882), politician
- Imre Vahot (1820–1879), writer, brother of Sándor Vachott
- József Zalár (1825–1914), poet, politician
- Károly Kamermayer (1829–1897), politician, educated in Gyöngyös
- Rudolf von Brudermann (1851–1941), general
- Soma Visontai (1854–1925), politician
- Gedeon Richter (1872–1944), pharmacist, grown up in Gyöngyös
- Béla Kerékjártó (1898–1946), mathematician
- Attila Szekrényessy (1913–1995), figure skater
- György Bálint (1919–2020), horticulturist
- István Tamási (1924–1995), horticulturist
- Balázs Balázs-Piri (1937–2014), grafican, caricaturist
- Margit Gréczi (1941–), painter
- László Polgár (1946–), chess teacher, psychologist
  His three daughters are Zsuzsanna, Zsófia and Judit chess masters and grandmasters.
- Ferenc Debreczeni (1948–), musician
- Tamás Király (1952–2013), fashion designer
- Pál Molnár (1952–), journalist
- Gábor Fodor (1962–), politician, minister
- Gábor Kálomista (1964–), film producer
- József Balázs (1965–), politician
- Ferenc Bozók (1973–), poet
- Gabriella Csépe (1973–), swimmer
- Zsófia Lakatos (1975–), economist
- Gábor Vona (1978–), politician
- András Zelena (1984–), psychologist
- Péter Kiss (1986–2013), mountaineer
- Zsófia Kovács (1988–), triathlete

== Twin towns – sister cities ==
Gyöngyös is twinned with:

- Lendava, Slovenia (2019)
- Luohe, China (2019)
- Manisa, Turkey (2012)
- Pieksämäki, Finland (2000)
- Ringsted, Denmark (1973)
- Sanok, Poland (2016)
- Shusha, Azerbaijan (2013)
- Štip, North Macedonia (2002)
- Târgu Secuiesc, Romania (1995)
- Zeltweg, Austria (1993)

== Gallery ==
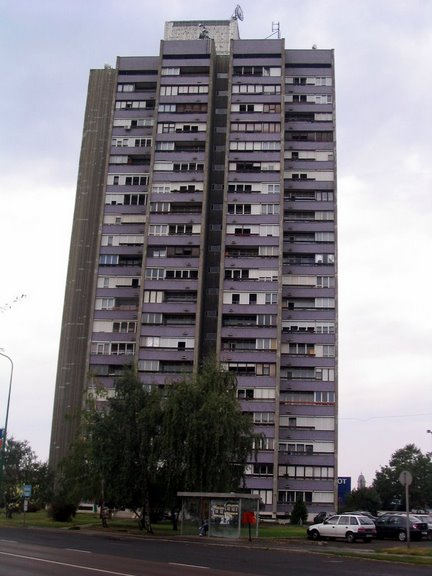
Reisdental tower

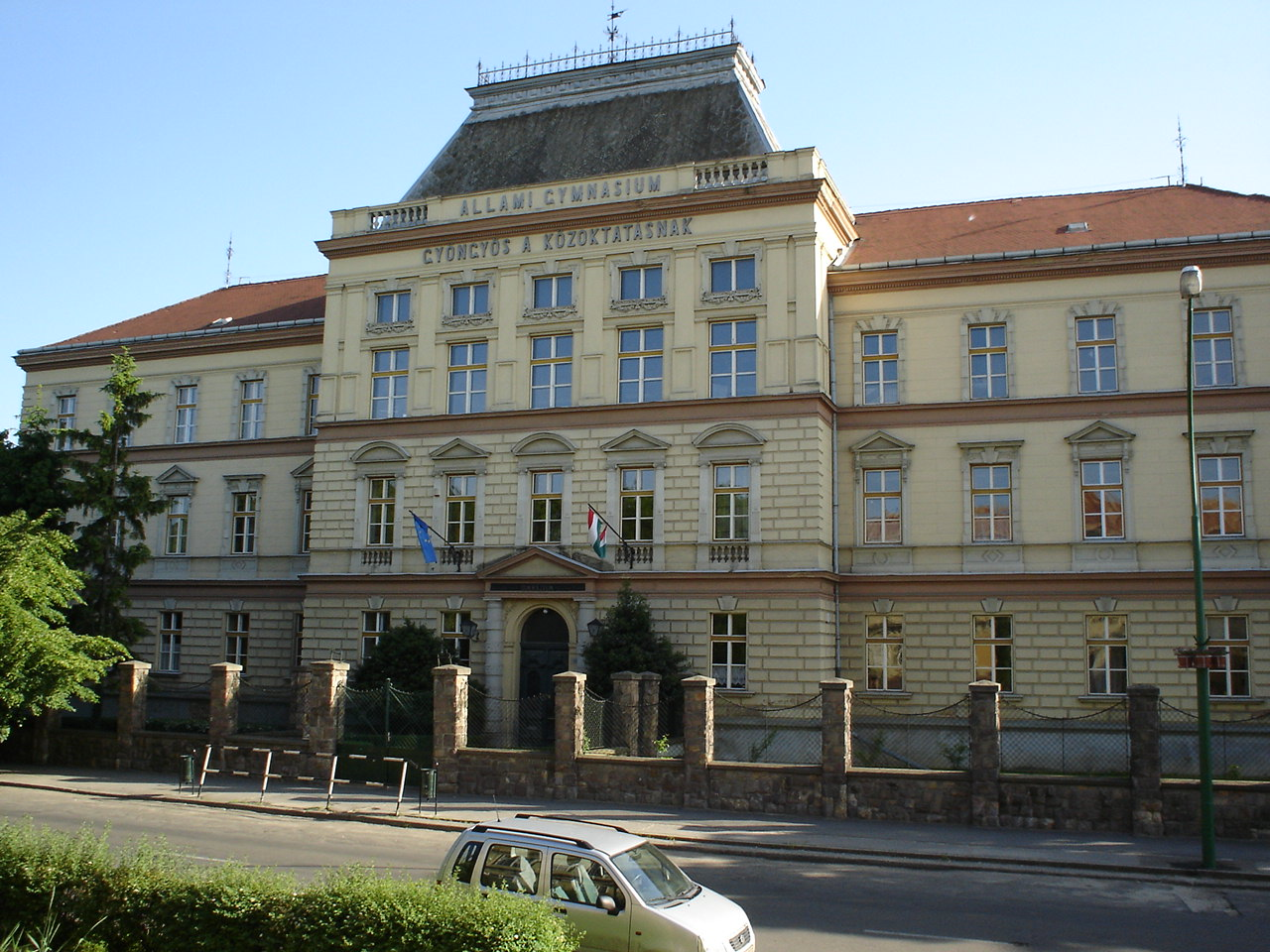
State gymnasium

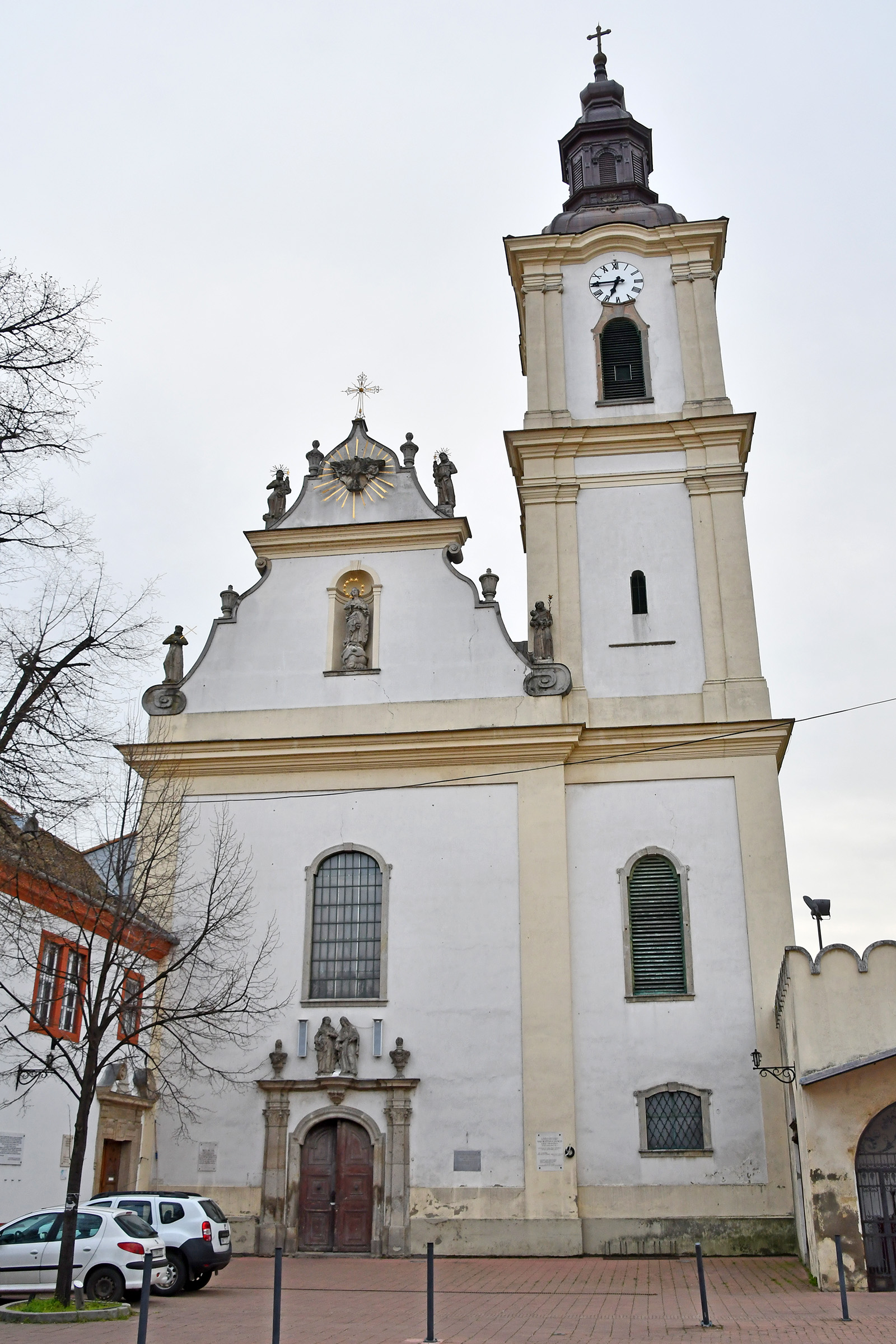
Church of the Franciscans

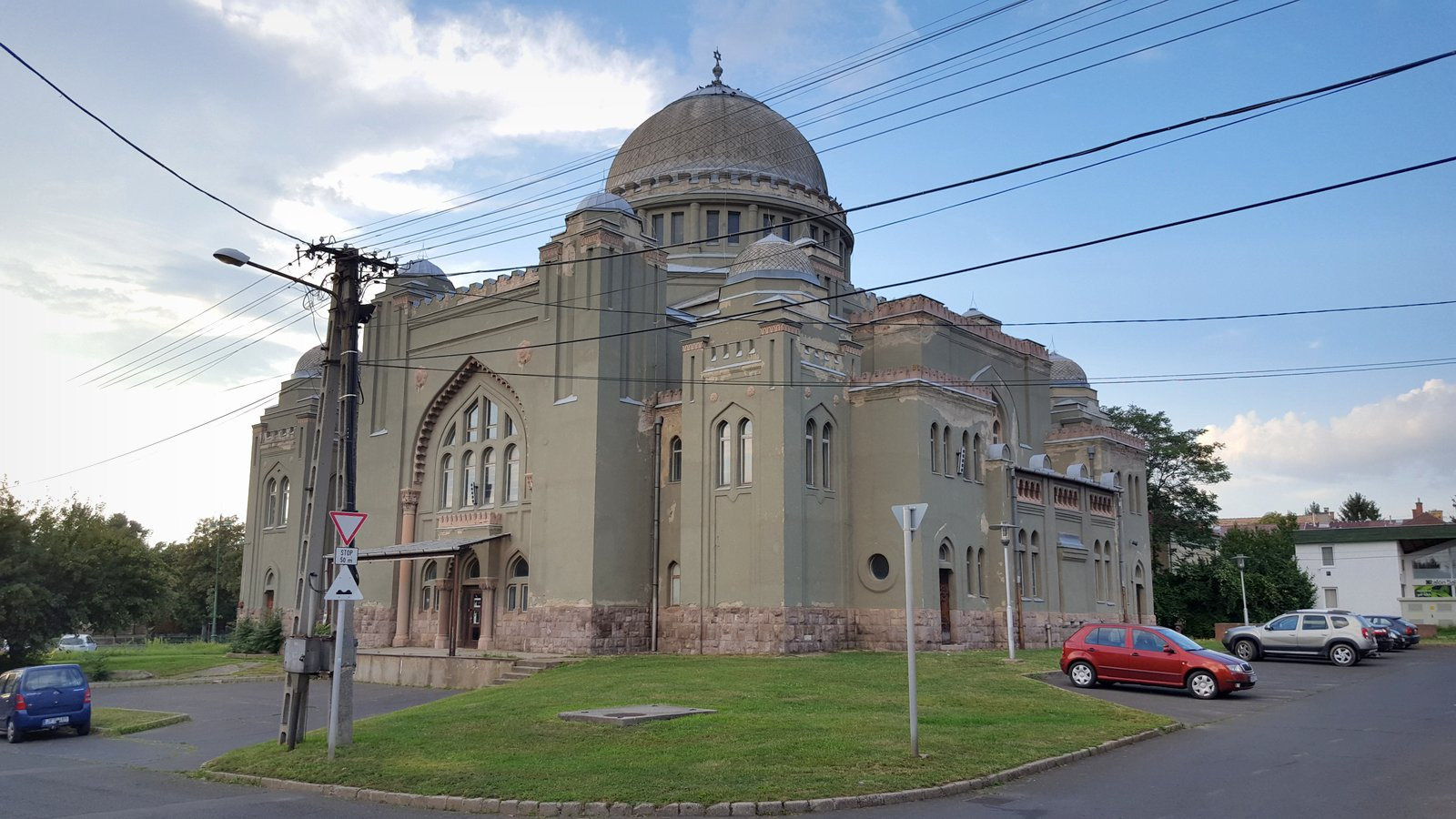
Synagogue (closed)

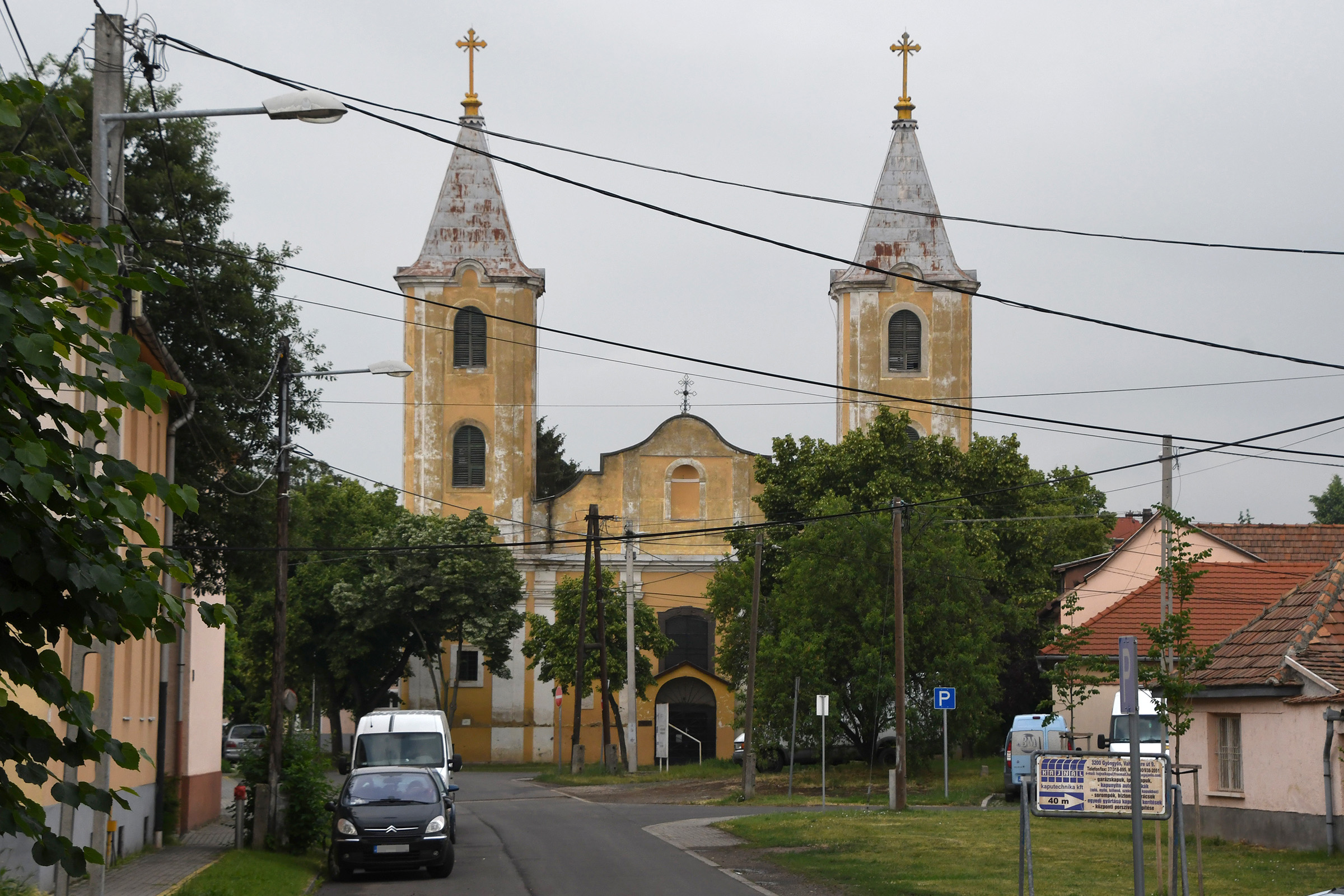
St. Urban Church
