= Piroska Szekrényessy =

Hungarian figure skater (1916–1990)

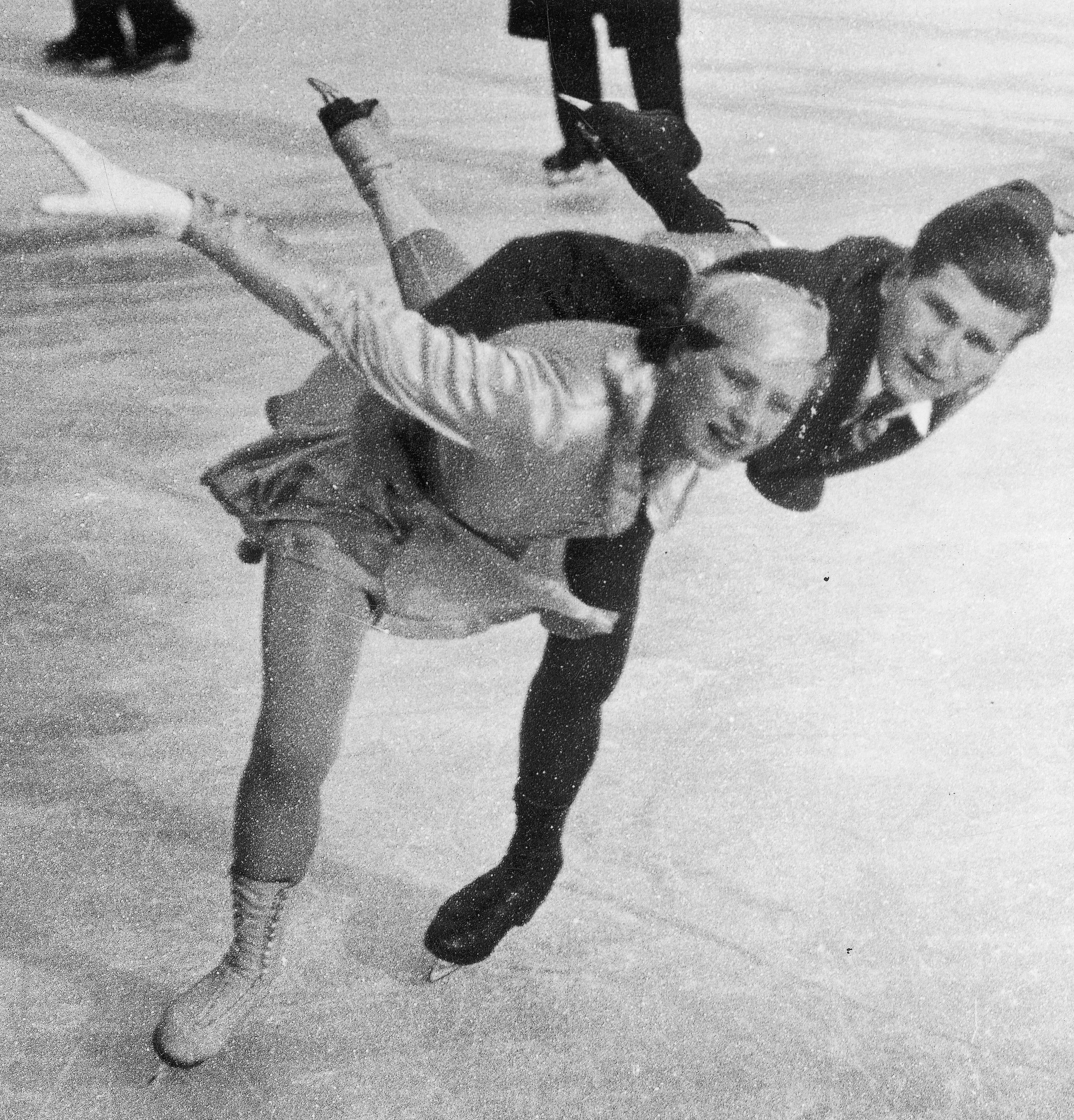
- Szekrényessy with her brother at the 1939 World Championships
- Born: May 1, 1916; Budapest, Hungary
- Died: October 30, 1990 (aged 74); Budapest, Hungary

Figure skating career
- Country: Hungary
- Discipline: Pair skating
- Partner: Attila Szekrényessy

Piroska Szekrényessy (born 1 May 1916 in Budapest, Hungary; died 30 October 1990 in Budapest) was a Hungarian pair skater who competed with her brother Attila Szekrényessy. They were six-time gold medalists at the Hungarian Figure Skating Championships. The pair finished fourth at the 1936 Winter Olympics and won the bronze medal at the European Figure Skating Championships in 1936 and 1937.

== Results ==
(with Attila Szekrényessy)

| Event | 1935 | 1936 | 1937 | 1938 | 1939 | 1940 | 1941 | 1942 | 1943 |
|---|---|---|---|---|---|---|---|---|---|
| Winter Olympics | | 4th | | | | | | | |
| World Championships | 4th | | 4th | 5th | 4th | | | | |
| European Championships | | 3rd | 3rd | 4th | | | | | |
| Hungarian Championships | | | 1st | 1st | 1st | | 1st | 1st | 1st |
