= Margit Gréczi =

Hungarian painter (born 1941)

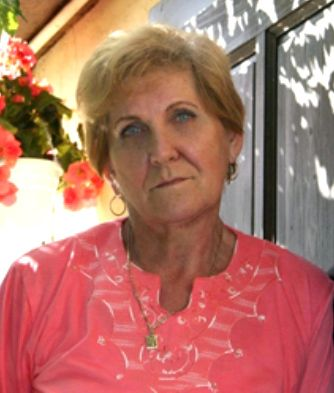
- Born: 13 December 1941 (age 84); Gyöngyös, Hungary
- Known for: Painter

Margit Gréczi (born 13 December 1941 in Gyöngyös) is a Hungarian painter.

== Career ==
She began to show interest in painting in her early childhood. Her art teacher, Gyuláné Békési at the Gyöngyösi Elementary School, spotted her talent and started to work with her towards becoming a professional painter. She took lessons from her teacher for many years.

After finishing Gyöngyösi Elementary School she applied to the Hungarian Art Gymnasium at Budapest where she got accepted. So she continued her studies there until the 1956 incidents interfered, when her parents called her home to Gyöngyös, because they were worried about her safety at Budapest. At Gyöngyös as there were no art schools, she started to go to Vak Bottyán János Economic Technikum. After that, she has done another three years of higher school, when she received her accountant qualification. She started working as an accountant at the Treasury Department of the City of Gyöngyös.

She continued painting during all these years. She has also learned a lot from hunt scenery painters, and few others who effected her style and techniques. Most of her work is oil painting. She paints portraits, landscapes, and still life, and one of her favorite subjects is hunt scenery and animal paintings. She also paints for order, such as pet portraits, family portraits, and landscapes. She became a member of the Gyöngyösi Art Club in 1966. Her works can be found all over the world at professional collectors in the United States, UK, Germany, France and Netherlands. In 2010 she won the Amateur Painter contest with her "Cirinke" titled painting.

== Painter's Camp ==
Since 2009 she attends Painter's Camps in Hungary and England yearly. Beside painting she also teaches painting to the young painters there.

- 2009. Székelyvarság, Hungary
- 2009. Adács, Hungary
- 2009. Mátra Sástó, Hungary
- 2010. Anglia, Bristol, England
- 2010. Mezőbergenyei Art Camp, Hungary
- 2010. Mátra Sástó, Hungary

== Solo exhibition ==
- 1996–2010. Gyöngyös Main Square Gallery, Hungary
- 2002. Tiszaszentimre Sumer Hunting Days, Hungary
- 2003. Mátrafüred Gallery, Hungary
- 2004. Gyöngyös Mátra Honvéd Casino Gallery, Hungary
- 2007. Debrecen DOTE Mini Gallery, Hungary
- 2009. Gyula Cukrász Museum (100 years anniversary), Hungary
- 2009. Gyula Elizabet Hotel Gallery, Hungary
- 2010. Telki Pipacs Gallery, Hungary
- 2010. Domoszló, Atkár, Gyöngyöshalász, Gyöngyös Exhibitions, Hungary

== Gallery ==
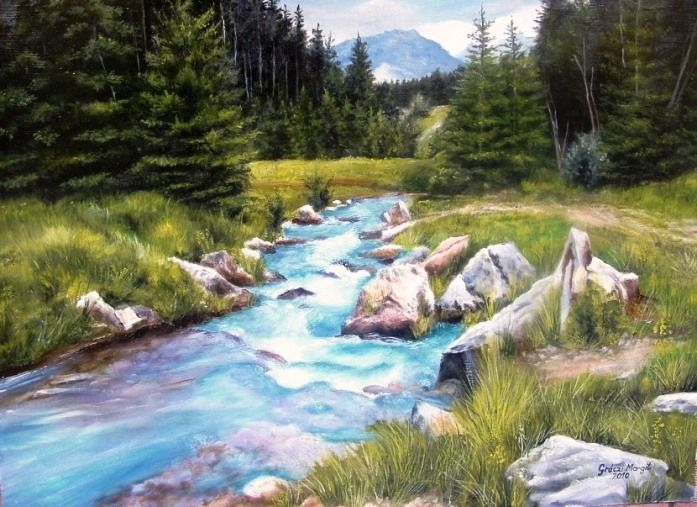
Csodálatos természet 2010

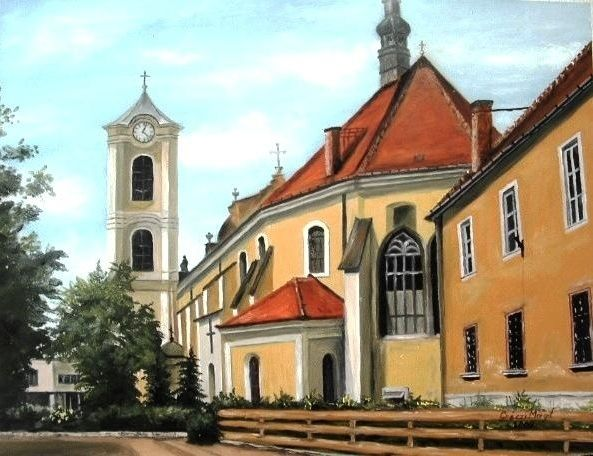
A gyöngyösi Szent Bertalan templom 2009

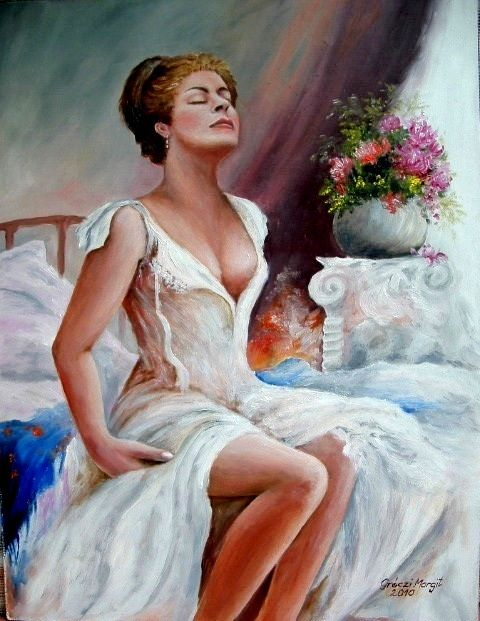
Hiúság
