= Saint Bartholomew Church, Gyöngyös, Hungary =

Coordinates: 47.7855°N 19.9256°E

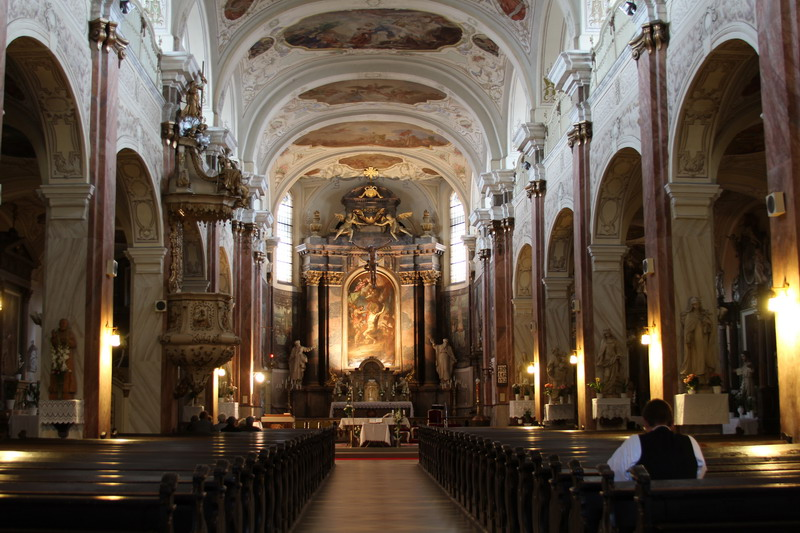
The Nave of St Bartholomew Church

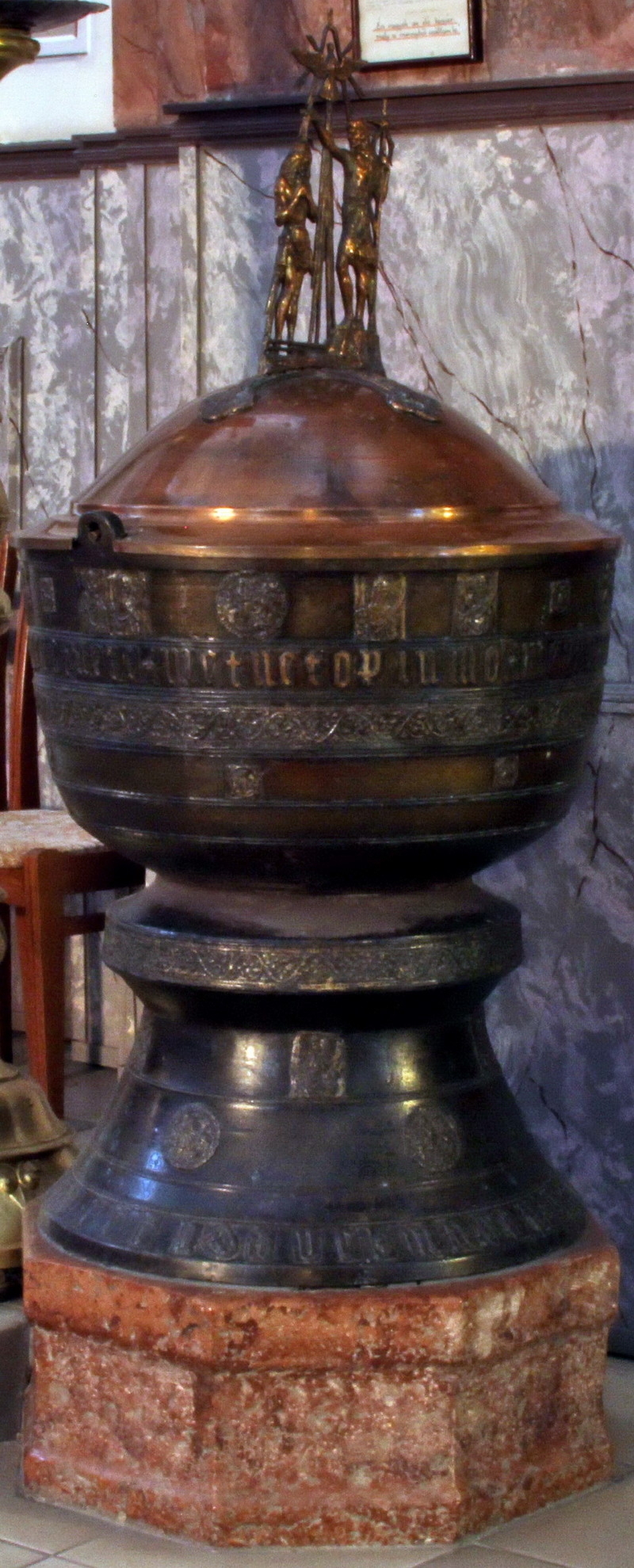
Gothic bronze font from the 16th century

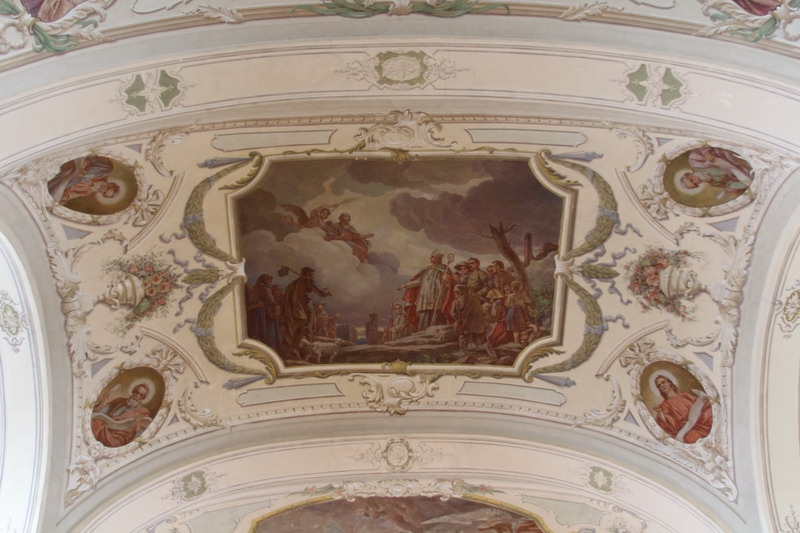
Fresco in St Bartholomew Church

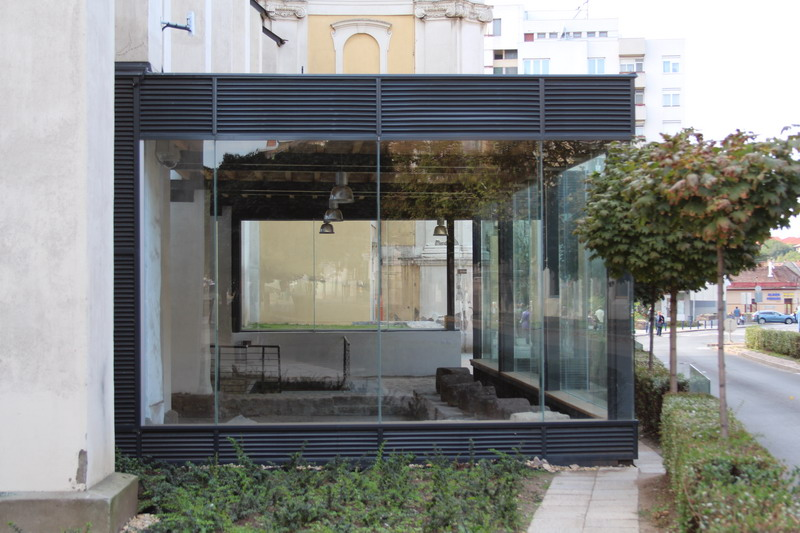
Archeological exploration and exhibition at the northern side of the church

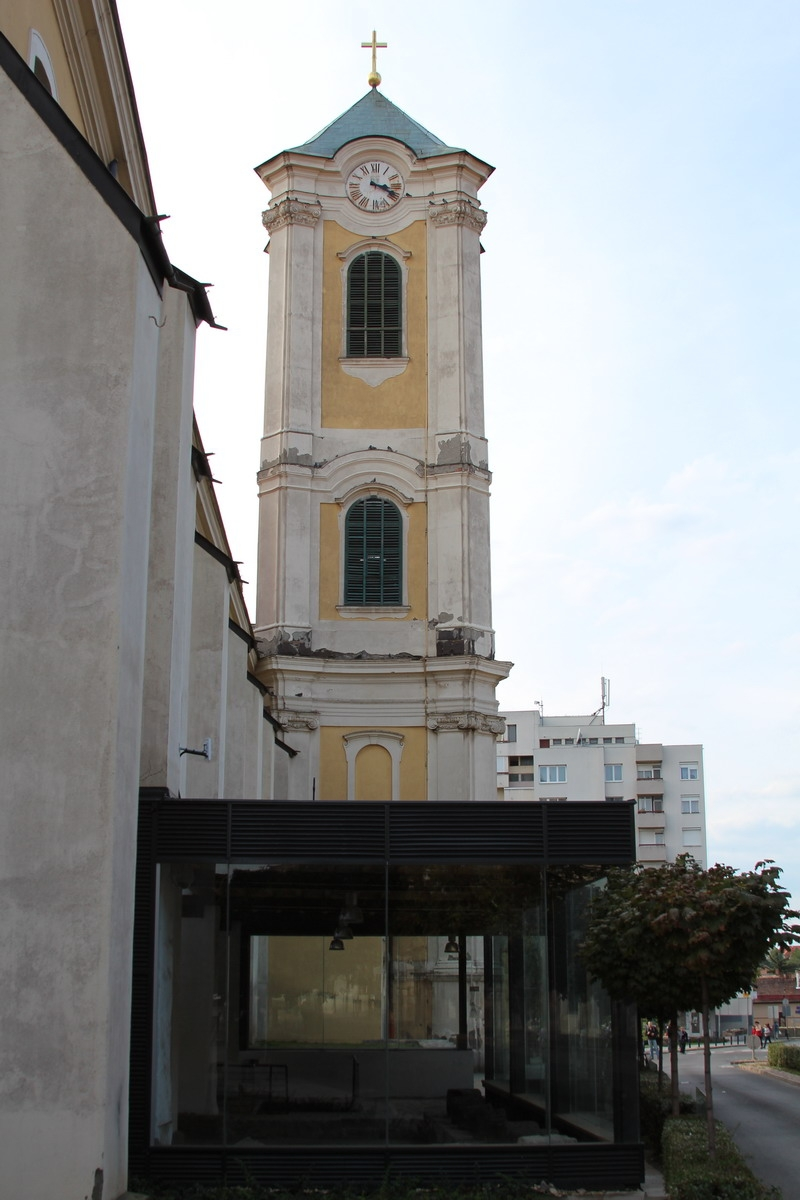
Northern Tower of St Bartholomew Church

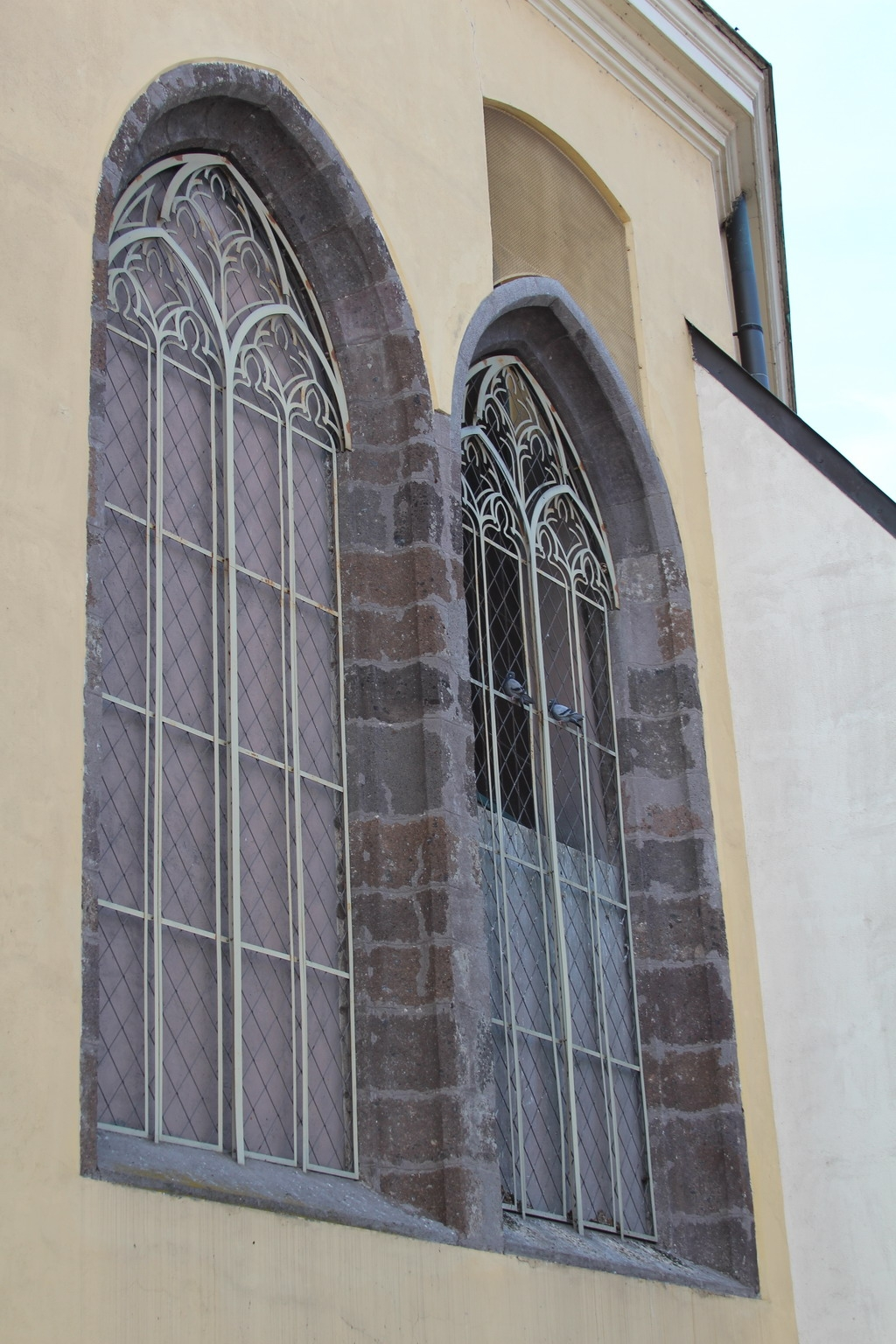
Gothic windows of St Bartholomew Church

Saint Bartholomew Church (Hungarian: Szent Bertalan Nagytemplom) is in the center of Gyöngyös (northern Hungary) and was built in the 14th century. The locals call it the "Big Church" (Hungarian: Nagytemplom) because it is the town and its vicinity's biggest one. Originally it was built in Gothic style, but today it shows the characteristics of a Baroque Church. One of the curiosities the church has is the bronze font made around the 16th century.

== History ==
The territory of today's Gyöngyös was inhabited around the Hungarian Conquest (around 895 AD) and since then, the downtown area has always been the center with its religious, municipal and market facilities. By the 14th century the settlement had had a church in the same place as you can see the church now, but then it was smaller and built in Gothic style.

The town was granted the rights of an agricultural town by Charles I of Hungary in 1334 upon the request of the settlement's landlord, Széchenyi Tamás. As the town were growing bigger and bigger, the church had to be enlarged from time to time. During the 15th century it was rebuilt again, and then it was made into a Gothic hall church. It used to be the largest Gothic church in Hungary having three aisles (the nave and two side aisles) and twenty winged altars, and today there are two Gothic coupled windows on each side of the apse reminding us to that era.

In later times, following the current fashion in architecture and decoration, the church gained its Baroque features. The foundation-stone of today's Baroque chancel was laid on May 2, 1741. Triforia were added halving the height of the side aisles, thus increasing the capacity of the church to 5,000 people. The construction of the northern tower started in 1774, while the southern tower was only started in 1815

The church suffered from fires on several occasions, the most devastating of which took place on May 21, 1917. The town, not having a pipe system, had been on flames for more than two days by the time water could be transported from the nearby village of Vámosgyörk. By that time the town and also the church had been severely damaged. Nearly 600 houses were burnt down, but only 11 people died. Even the soldiers were allowed from the frontlines of World War I to go home to help rebuild the town. The reconstruction of the church could start in 1920 and ended in 1922. The architects were Nagy Virgil and Wälder Gyula. The inner decoration and the fresques were made by the best of the age, such as Tardos Krenner Viktor and Dudits Andor, whose paintings can also be found in the building of the Parliament. The church was last renovated in 1992 when the walls were entirely repainted.

In the crypt of the church several landlords and their families were buried during the course of time. Since the 1960s there have been archeological researches. There is now a new glass-walled addition to the northern side of the church. Entering this, the results of the archeological investigations can be seen, and following them we can get to know the history of the construction of the church.
