= Attila Szekrényessy =

Hungarian figure skater

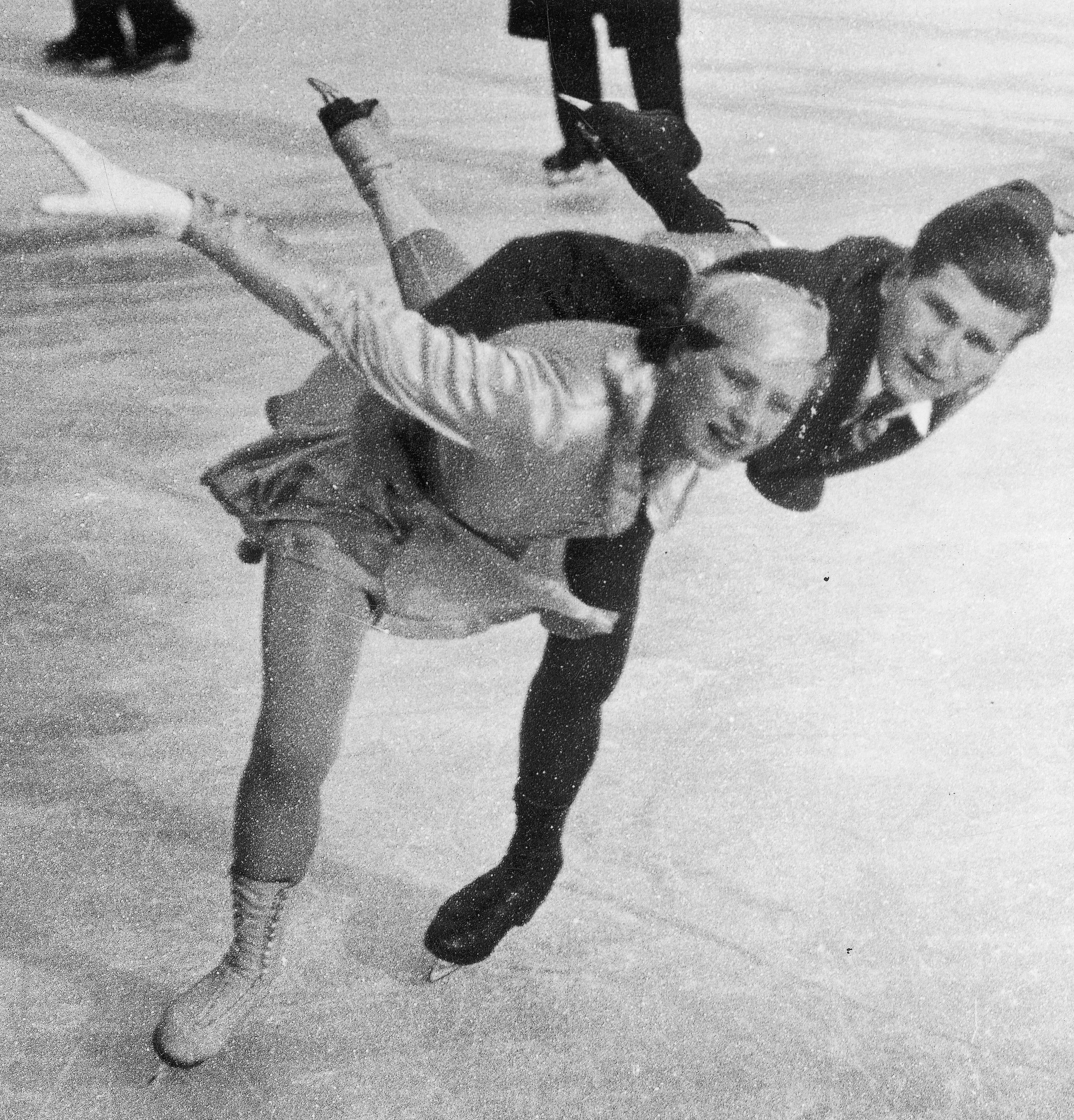
- Szekrényessy with his sister at the 1939 World Championships

Personal information
- Born: 20 January 1913 Budapest, Hungary
- Died: 21 January 1995 (aged 82) Gyöngyös, Hungary

Figure skating career
- Country: Hungary
- Discipline: Pair skating
- Partner: Piroska Szekrényessy
Medal record
Pairs Figure skating
Representing Hungary
European Championships
Bronze medal – third place	1937 Berlin	Pairs
Bronze medal – third place	1936 Prague	Pairs

Attila Szekrényessy (20 January 1913 – 21 January 1995) was a Hungarian pair skater who competed with his sister Piroska Szekrényessy. He was born in Budapest, Hungary and died in Gyöngyös. He and his sister were six-time gold medalists at the Hungarian Figure Skating Championships. The pair finished fourth at the 1936 Winter Olympics and won the bronze medal at the European Figure Skating Championships in 1936 and 1937.

== Results ==
(with Piroska Szekrényessy)

Event	1935	1936	1937	1938	1939	1940	1941	1942	1943
Winter Olympics		4th							
World Championships	4th		4th	5th	4th				
European Championships		3rd	3rd	4th					
Hungarian Championships			1st	1st	1st		1st	1st	1st
