= József Balázs (politician) =

Hungarian politician

Member of the National Assembly
- In office 14 May 2010 – 5 May 2014

Personal details
- Born: 1 October 1965 (age 60) Gyöngyös, Hungary
- Party: Fidesz
- Profession: politician

József Balázs (born 1 October 1965) is a Hungarian politician, member of the National Assembly (MP) for Gyöngyös, Heves County (Constituency III) between 2010 and 2014. He was a member of the Committee on Audit Office and Budget since 14 May 2010.

He served as mayor of Nagyréde from 1991 to 2014.
