= Soma Visontai =

Soma Visontai (1854–1925) was a Hungarian lawyer and deputy.

Visontai was born in Gyöngyös on 9 November 1854 as Soma Weinberger, the son of Albert Weinberger and Julianna Schweitzer. He was educated at Budapest, where he changed his name in 1881 and became an attorney in 1882. While still a student he attracted much attention by his papers on political economy in the scientific journals of Hungary, and he also edited the Vasút. He became widely known as a pleader in 1890, when he successfully defended the editor of the Zasztava, the leader of the radical wing of the Serbians in Hungary, in a trial for political murder. As a mark of gratitude, the people of Neusatz, being Serbian sympathizers, elected Visontai in 1892 to the Hungarian Parliament as a supporter of Kossuth; and since 1899 he represented his native town, Gyöngyös, in Parliament. He was an eminent authority on criminal law and a member of the board of examiners for admission to the bar; and he prepared a large portion of the preliminary drafts for the criminal code.
