= Mátraszentimre =

Mátraszentimre Alkár
- Village
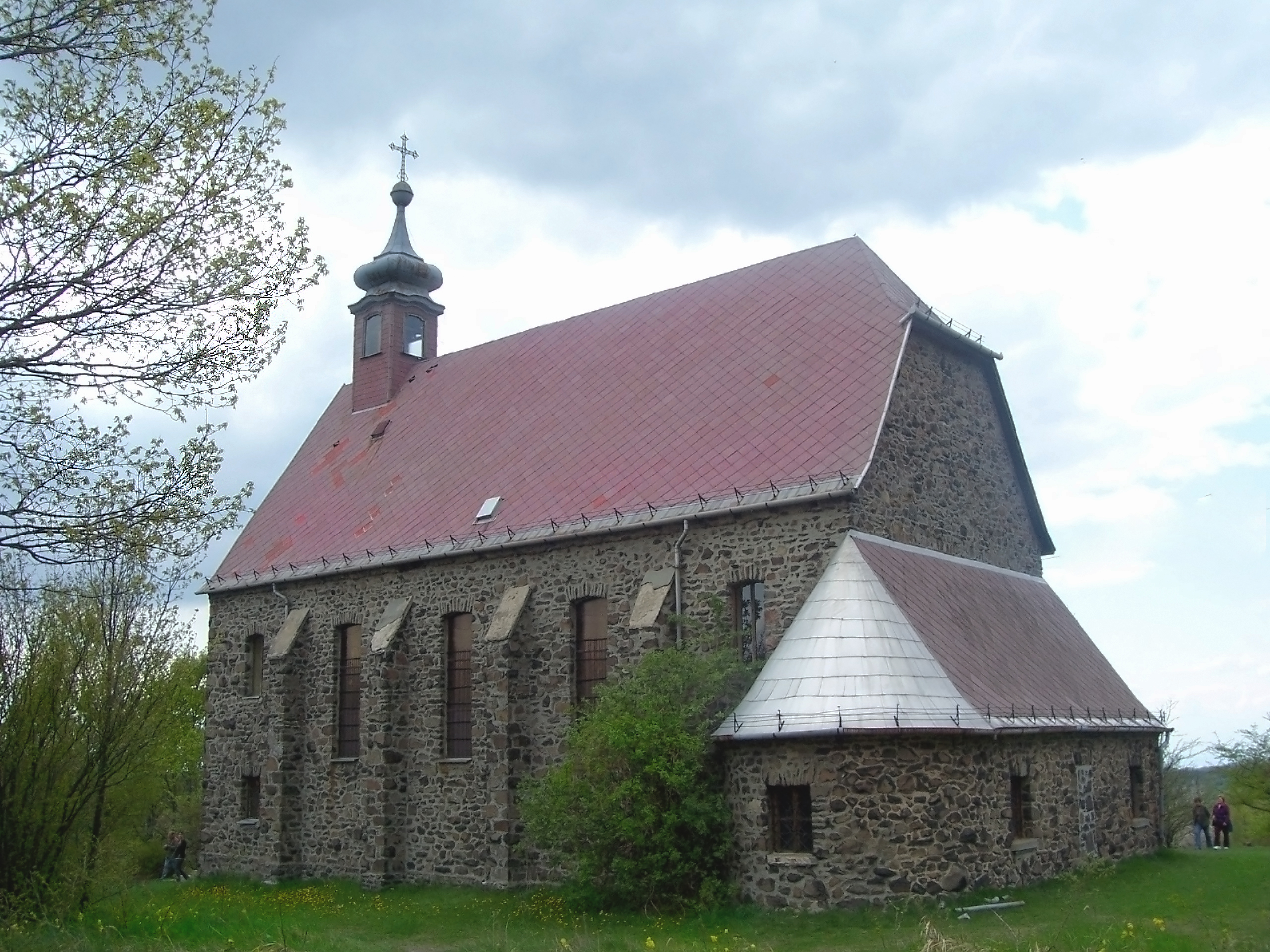
- King Saint Stephen Church

- Coat of arms

- Location in Hungary
- Coordinates: 47°54′35″N 19°52′33″E
- Country: Hungary
- County: Heves
- District: Gyöngyös
- Foundation: 1944

Government
  - Mayor: Péter Előházi (Ind.)

Area
  - Total: 21.29 km^{2} (8.22 sq mi)

Population (2022)
  - Total: 455
  - Density: 21.4/km^{2} (55.4/sq mi)
- Time zone: UTC+1 (CET)
  - Summer (DST): UTC+2 (CEST)
- Postal code: 3234, 3235
- Area code: 37
- Website: www.felso-matra.hu

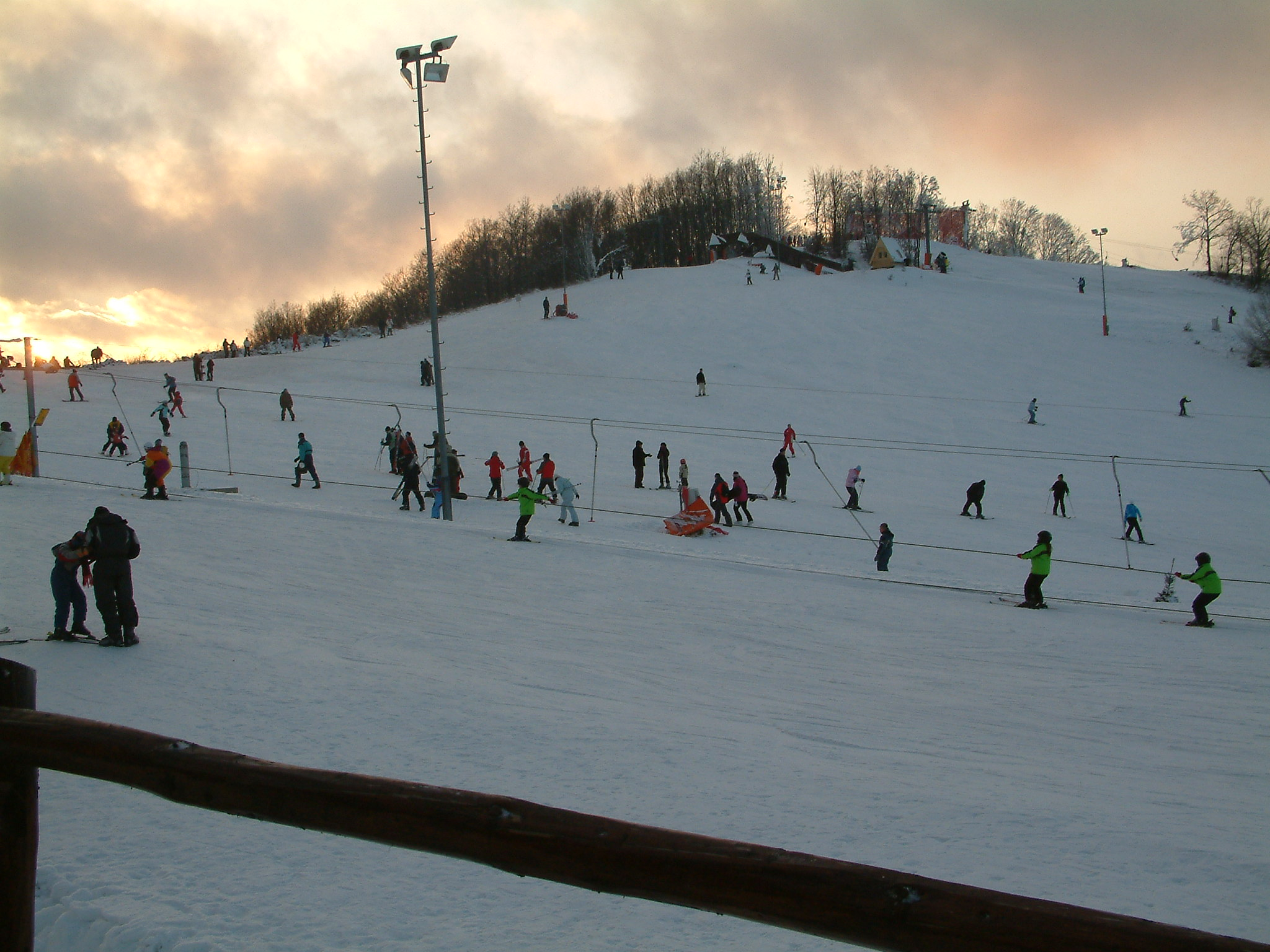
Ski resort

Mátraszentimre (Slovak: Alkár) is a village in Heves County, Hungary, in the Mátra mountain range, between the Darázs, Teréz and Nagy-Átal-kő mountains. The Galya-tető peak is inside of the village territory, east from the center. As of 2022 census, it has a population of 455 (see Demographics). The village located 17.5 km from (Nr. 81) Hatvan–Fiľakovo railway line, 21.9 km from the main road 21 and 38.0 km from the M3 motorway. The Mátraszőlős-Hasznos railway stop is the closest on the Hatvan–Fiľakovo railway line, and 7.8 km from the village is the Szalajkaház terminus of the Mátravasút, which is a narrow-gauge railway to Gyöngyös for tourist.

== History ==
The first writings relating to the territory of today's settlement mentions Ágasvár in 1265. The castle is 6.3 km from Mátraszentimre and in the 15th century it was only a ruin, the remains of ramparts can still be seen today. The first Slovak settlers built their first glass huta in 1741 in the valley of the Csörgő creek, then in the 1780s they abandoned it and created new huts next to the Hutahelyi creek and on the side of Nárád mountain. Felsőhuta (Slovak: Horná Huta) and Fiskalitáshuta (Slovak: Fiškalitáš Huta) were created by harvesting the forests. In addition to glass production and coal burning, they were engaged in animal husbandry and farming. The first school was established at Fiskalitáshuta in 1896. 5 families moved to the other side of Teréz mountain and Dobogó mountain from Felsőhuta and created Ötházhuta (Slovak: Alkár). Under the Galya-tető east of the settlements, the Mátra Association established a hostel in 1894. An andesite watchtower was erected on the Péter-hegyese to the east of the Galya-tető in 1934. In memory of the saints of the Árpád dynasty, the settlements were renamed in 1938: Felsőhuta to Mátraszentistván (named after King St. Stephen), Fiskalitáshuta to Mátraszentlászló (named after King St. Ladislaus) and Ötházhuta to Mátraszentimre (named after Prince St. Emerich. A new luxury hotel was built under the Péter-hegyese lookout tower in 1939. The Church of Patrona Hungariae built on Galya-tető in 1941. The King Saint Stephen Church was built above Mátraszentlászló in 1942 and was intended as the "Church of the 3 villages". Until 1944 the villages was part of the territory of Hasznos, but in 1944 Mátraszentimre became independent and Mátraszentlászló and Mátraszentistván were added to it. Based on the Czechoslovak–Hungarian population exchange agreement in 1948, most of the population was displaced, Galya-tető was also annexed to Mátraszentimre in the same year. Mrs. László Sánta had two visions of the Virgin Mary in 1947-48. Based on the first, she found the Fallós well, and according to the second, she should have had a chapel built. Because of her visions, she was locked up in a psychiatric hospital. However, the Catholic Church bought the area around the well in 1987 and the "Queen of Forests" chapel was built in 1990, then the Queen of Peace church in 2006. Weekend houses were established on Fallóskút, and the settlement became a place of pilgrimage. The St. Emerich Church was also built in Mátraszentimre in 1980, considering that the Mátraszentlászló church is 2.9 km from the village. The importance of tourism increased in the 1960s and hotels and ski slopes were built one after the other, at the same time animal husbandry was banned, which led to the greening of the meadows. The observatory was built on the Piszkés-tető in 1960 and has been open to visitors since 2013. The folk museum handed over in 2012 represents the culture of the Slovak minority. Of the ski slopes, only those established on Bagolyirtás and Oszicsinszki mountain are in use nowadays. A ski resort above Mátraszentistván was created in 2004 by expanding the ski slopes on the Oszicsinszki mountain. A watchtower was built on the Vörös-kő in 2005, opposite Mátraszentlászló. In 2015, a new hostel was established in Galyatető. The Ágasvár's hostel, Mátraszentistván and Galya-tető are stamping places of the National Blue Trail.

== Demographics ==
According the 2022 census, 88.6% of the population were of Hungarian ethnicity, 27.7% were Slovak, 1.2% were German, 1.0% were Ukrainian and 10.6% were did not wish to answer. The religious distribution was as follows: 47.5% Roman Catholic, 5.2% Calvinist, 2.2% Lutheran, 6.2% non-denominational, and 37.1% did not wish to answer. The Slovaks have a local nationality government. The settlement is made up of several separate parts. The number of the inhabitants in the inner areas were the followings: Mátraszentimre – 234, Mátraszentistván – 60, Mátraszentlászló – 47, Galyatető – 43, Bagolyirtás – 11 and Fallóskút – 4. Further 5 people live in a resort place 6.3 km away from the village. Galyatető have an own post code (3234).

Population by years:

Year	1870	1880	1890	1900	1910	1920	1930	1941
Population	603	674	768	905	1075	1200	1447	1720
Year	1949	1960	1970	1980	1990	2001	2011	2022
Population	581	1418	752	717	584	544	472	455

== Politics ==
Mayors since 1990:

- 1990–1994: Lajos Szabad (independent)
- 1994–2019: András József Stuller (Until 1998 Slovak Association, but from 1998 independent)
- 2019–: Péter Előházi (independent)

== Gallery ==
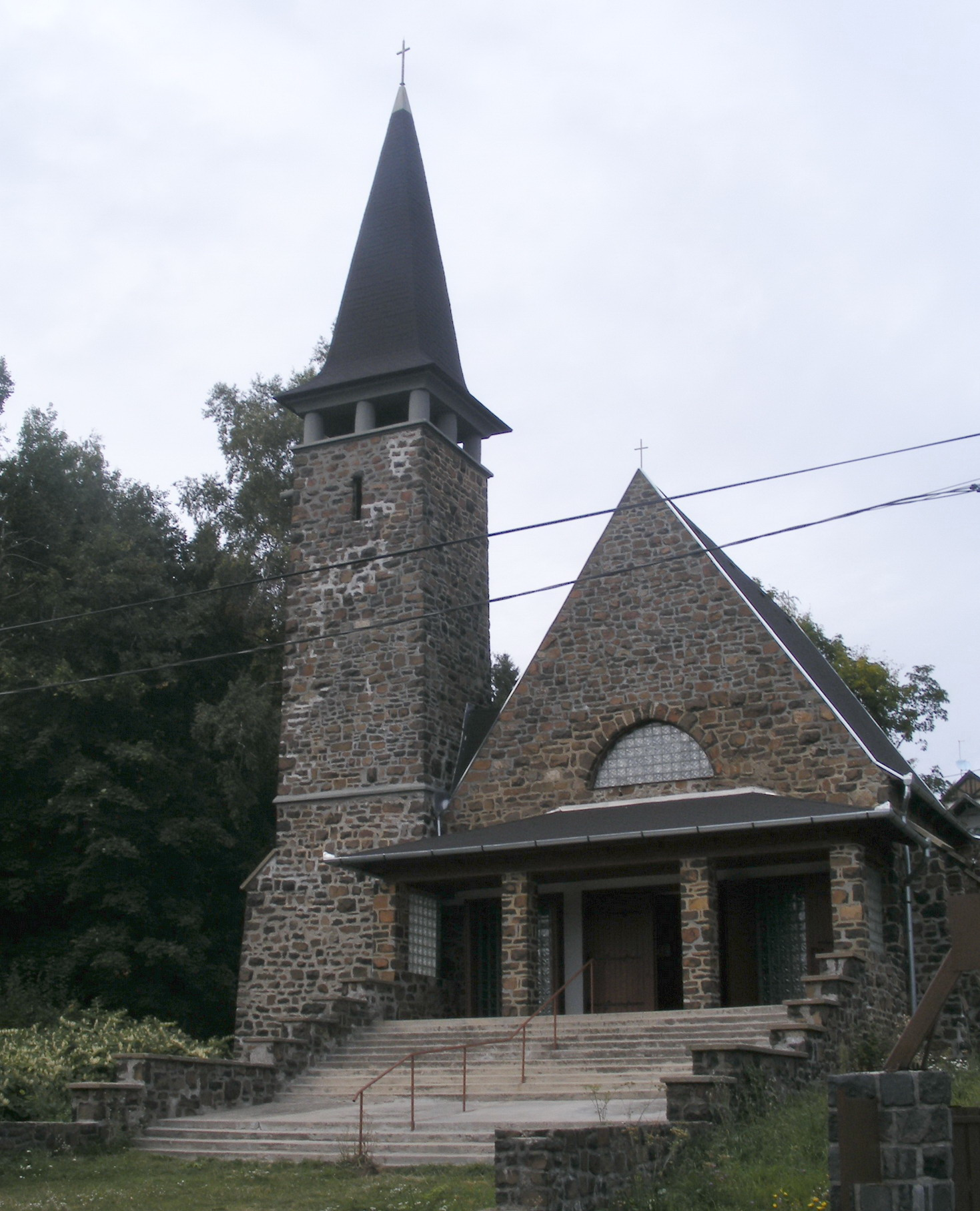
Patrona Hungariae Church

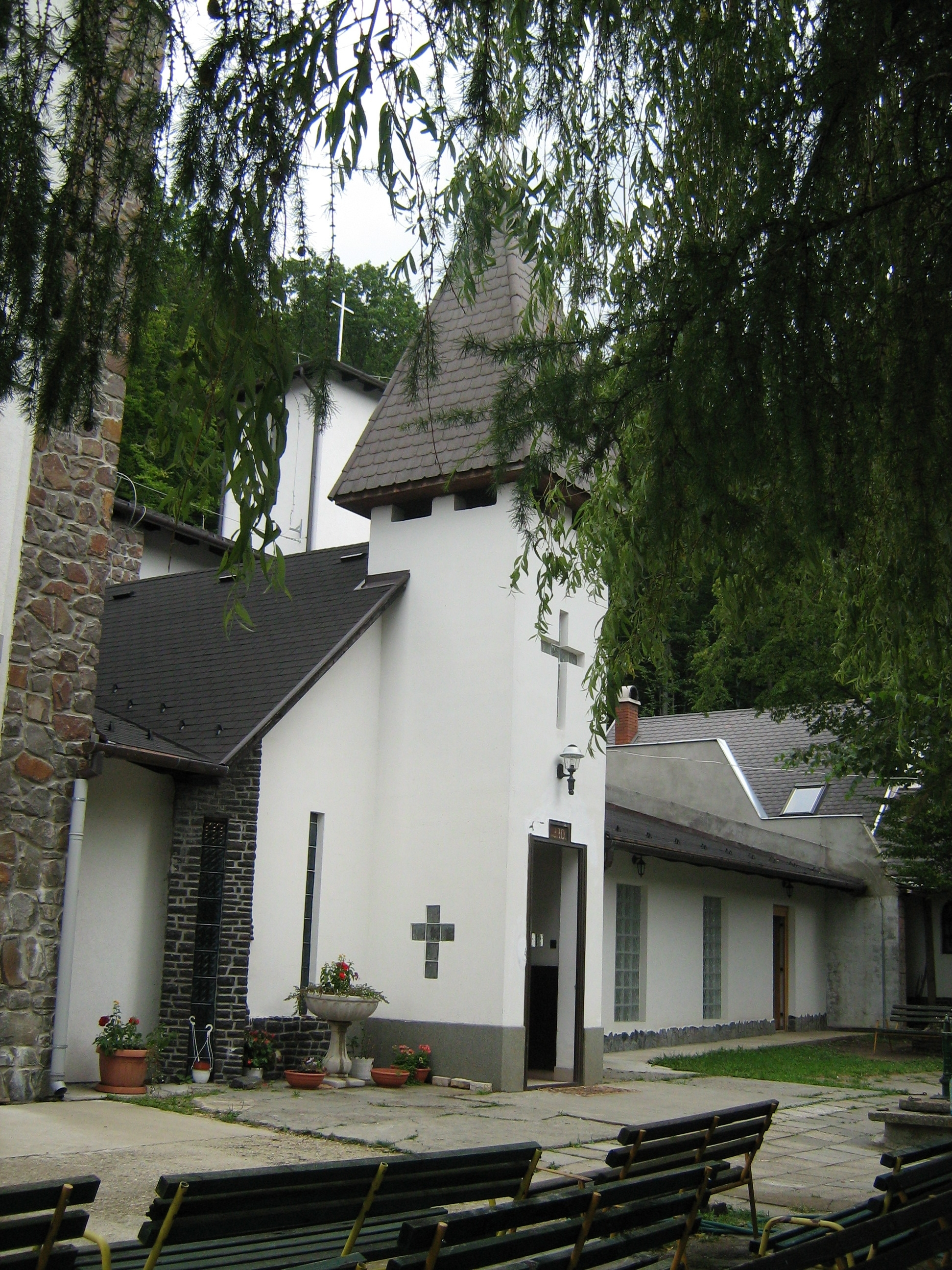
Queen of Forests Chapel

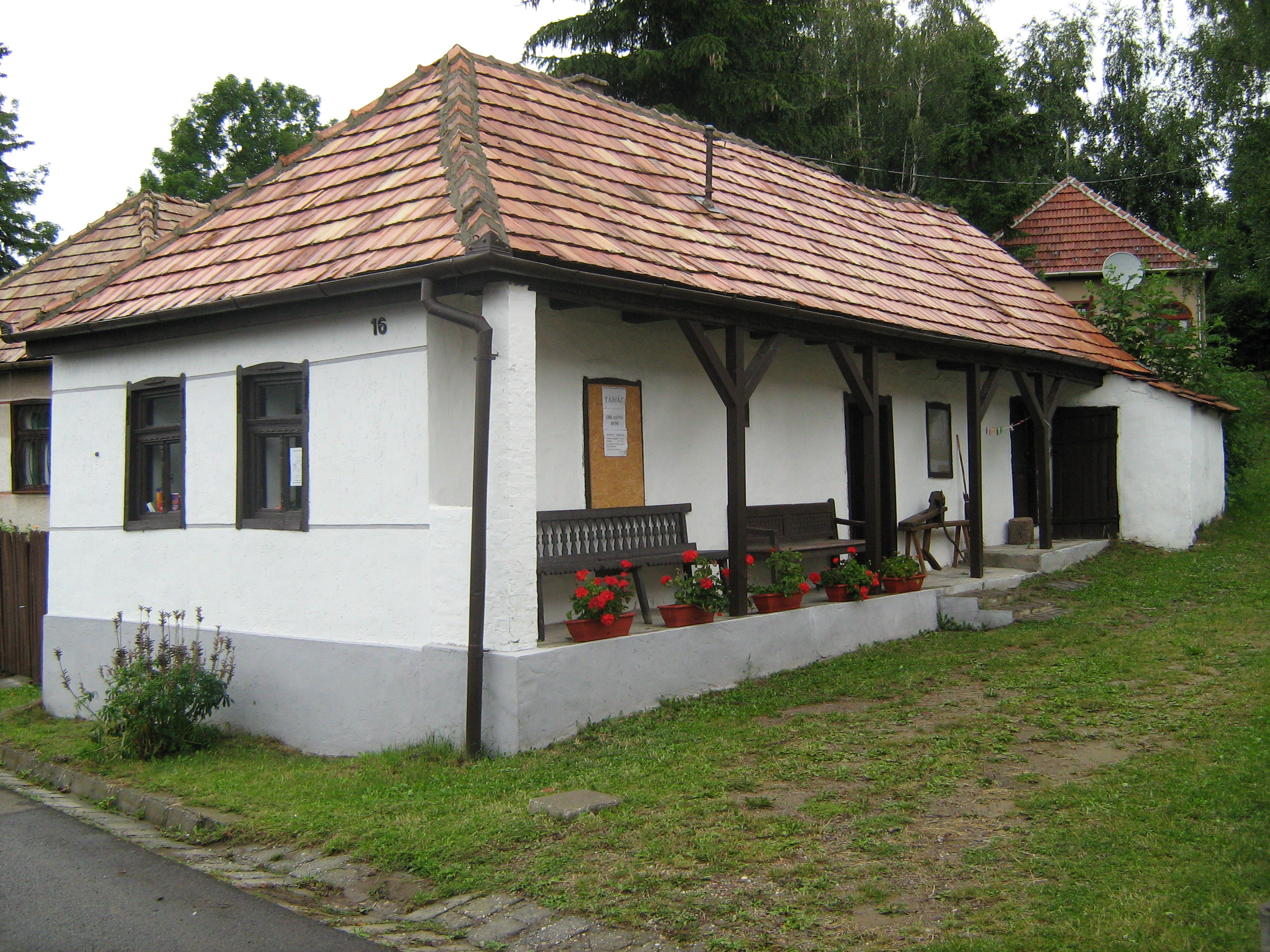
Slovak Folk Museum

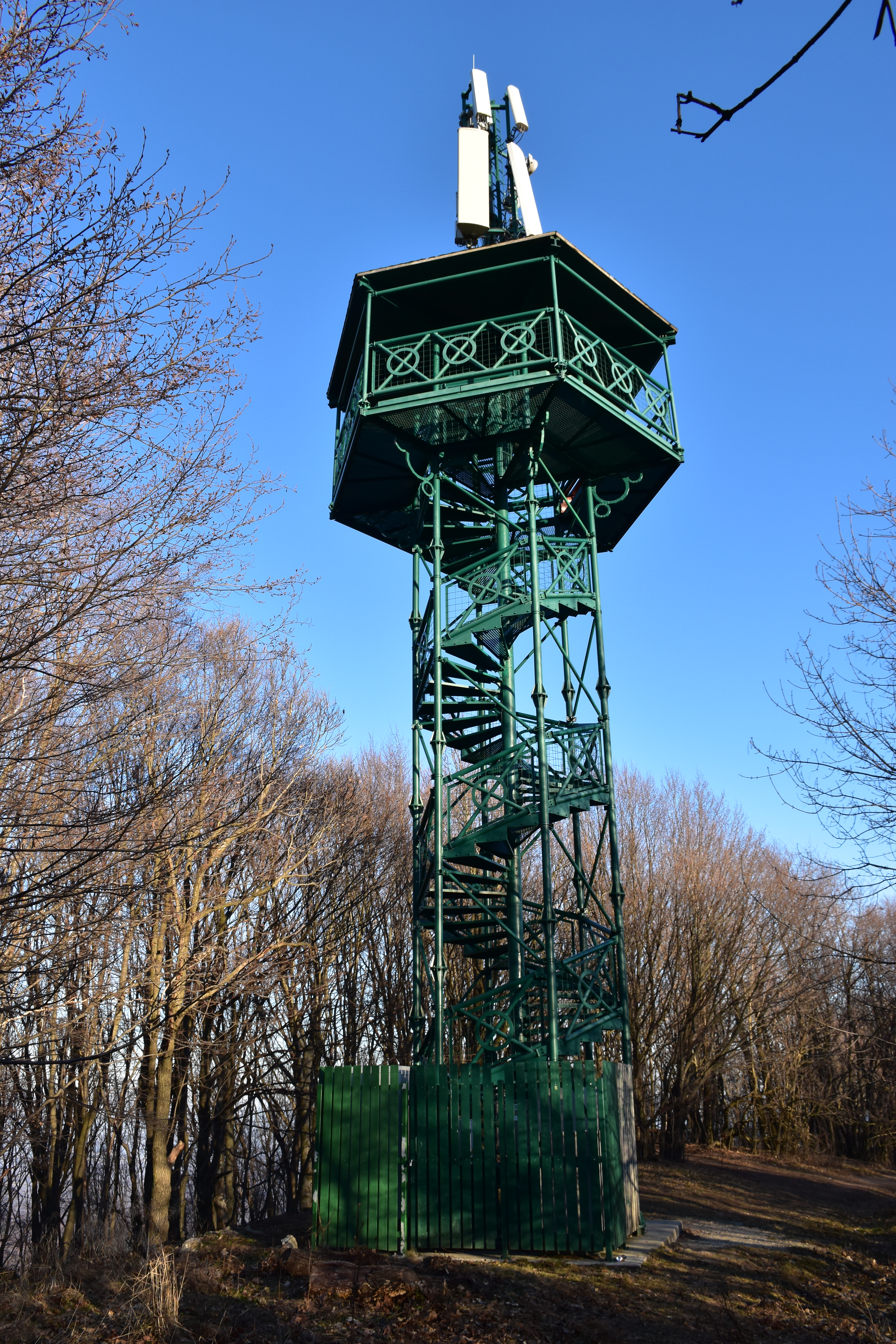
Vörös-kő watchtower

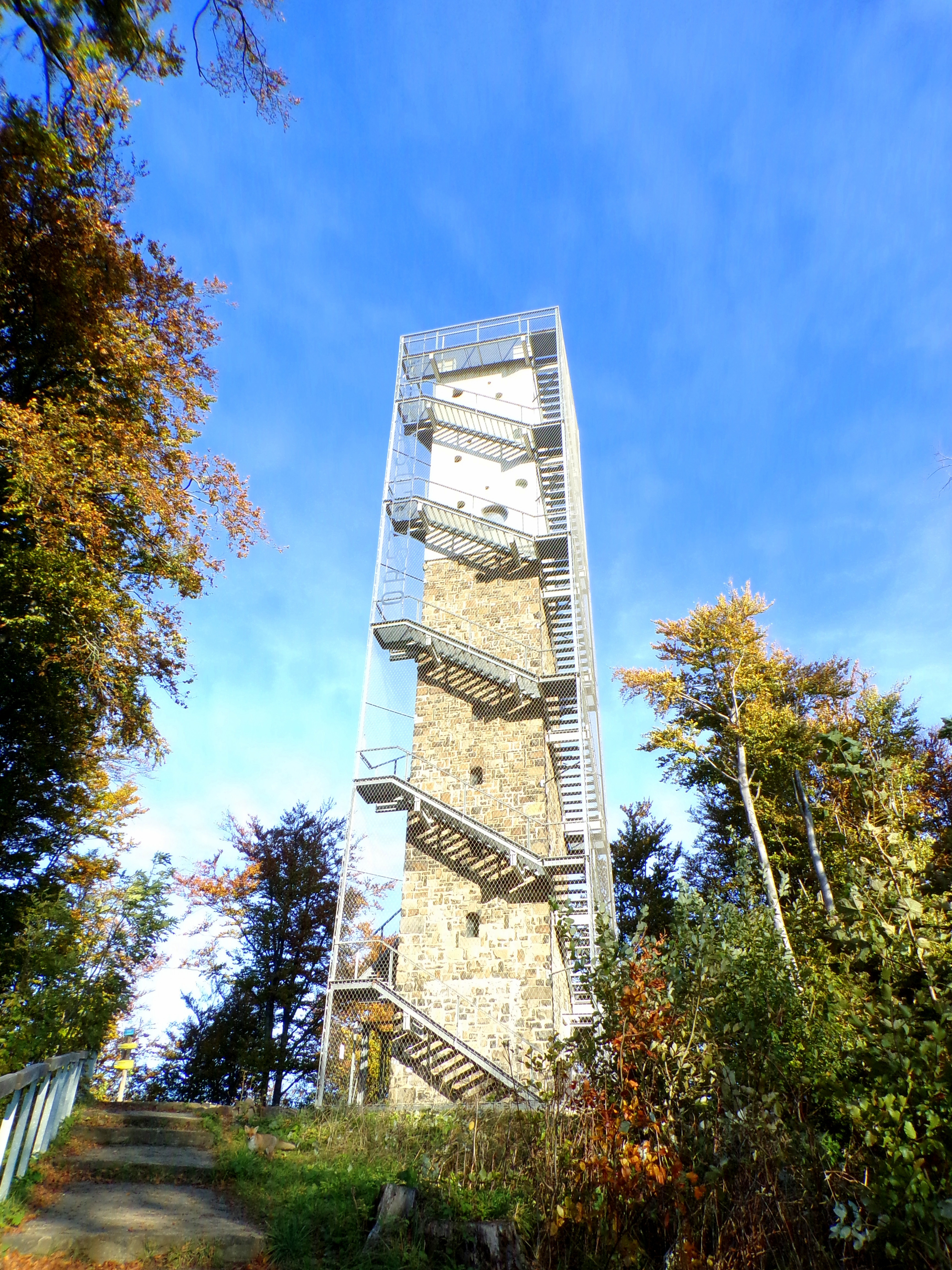
Péter hegyese watchtower
