= Battle of Kápolna =

Battle during the 1848 Hungarian Revolution

Coordinates: 47°45′30″N 20°14′11″E

- Part of the Hungarian Revolution of 1848
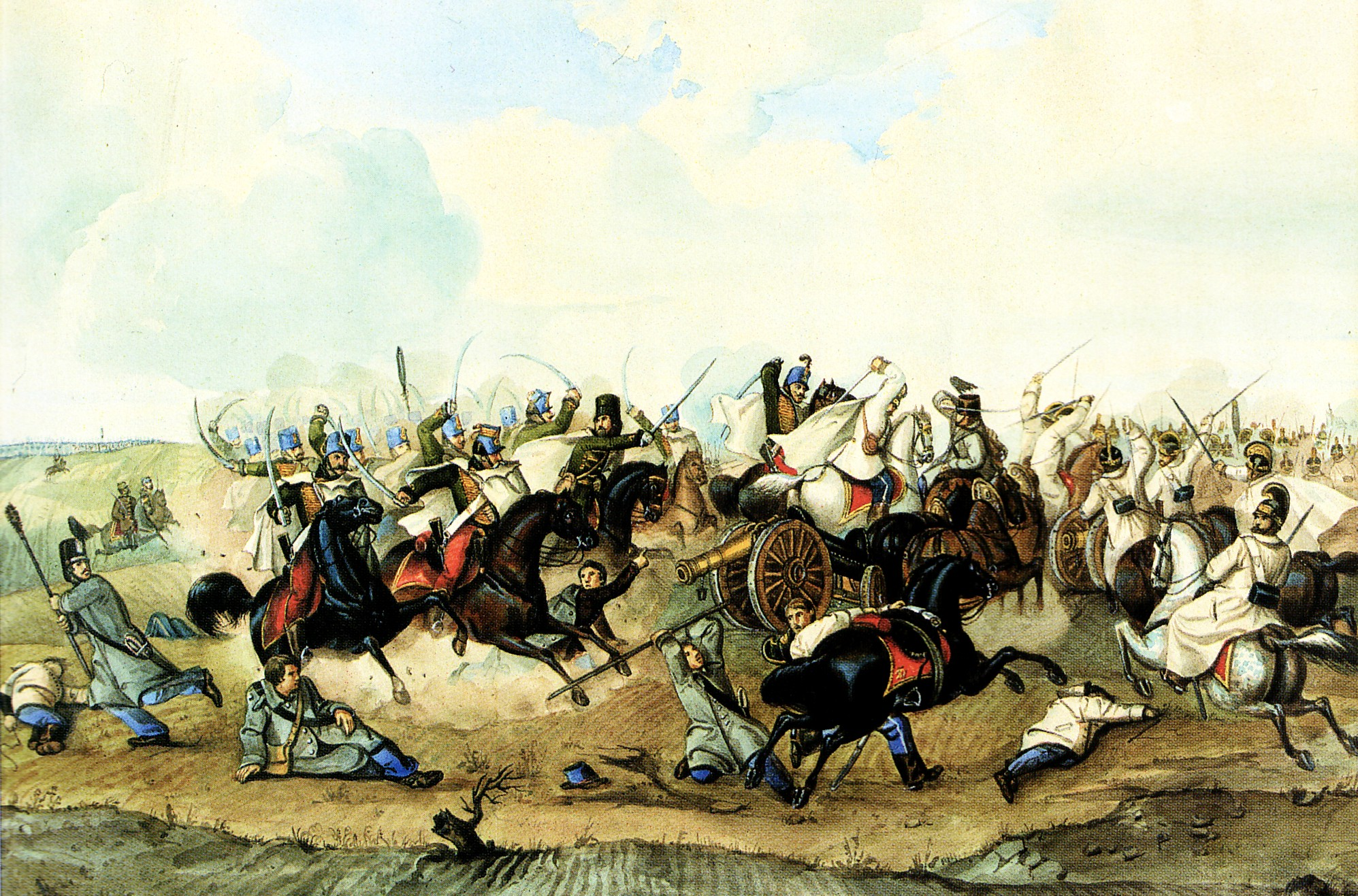
- Painting of The Battle of Kápolna by Mór Than
Date	26 and 27 February 1849
Location	Kápolna, Heves County, Hungary
Result	Austrian victory

Belligerents
Hungarian Revolutionary Army; Polish Legion; Italian volunteers	Austrian Empire

Commanders and leaders
Henryk Dembiński; Artúr Görgei; György Klapka	Alfred I, Prince of Windisch-Grätz; Franz Schlik

Strength
Total participants: 27,135 men 88 cannons Did not participate: 13,079 men 55 cannons	Total participants: 21,640 men 147 cannons Did not participate: 8360 men 18 cannons

Casualties and losses
1,540 – 1,740	351

The Battle of Kápolna was one of the decisive battles of the Hungarian war of Independence of 1848–1849, fought on 26 and 27 February 1849 between the Hungarian revolutionary army led by Lieutenant General Henryk Dembiński and the Austrian main army operating in Hungary Field Marshal Alfred I, Prince of Windisch-Grätz. After the Austrian offensive from the winter of 1848–1849, which resulted in losing the Western part of the country, the Hungarian army tried its first major counter-attack, but due to the disastrous leadership of the Polish Henryk Dembiński, the battle ended with an Austrian victory, and this did not influence only the military situation, but also the politics of central Europe: Franz Joseph I announced the March Constitution of Austria on 4 March 1849.

== Background ==
With the breakthrough at Branyiszkó on 5 February 1849 by the Corps of the Upper Danube led by General Artúr Görgei, the concentration of the Hungarian armies against the invading Austrian troops became possible. A commander-in-chief had to be found to lead the Hungarian main army. The chairman of the Commission of National Defence (the de facto Hungarian Government after the resignation of the Batthyány Government), Lajos Kossuth, was angered by General Artúr Görgei's (the most capable general of the Hungarian army) Declaration of Vác from 5 January 1849, their relations deteriorated, and so he invited Lieutenant General Henryk Dembiński, who was then living in French exile, to Hungary and appointed him commander-in-chief on 29 January 1849. The Polish general "imported" from France, Dembiński, one of the former commanders-in-chief of the Polish War of Independence of 1830–31, who was invited to Hungary from Paris by László Teleki in early January, seemed a convenient choice for Kossuth, who in this way prevented Görgei to take over the command of the Hungarian main army. His former activity as a military leader also seemed promising. The general became famous in Europe with his successful retreat from Lithuania in 1831, and his name was obviously not unknown to Kossuth, who had followed the events of the Polish War of Independence of 1830–1831 in his youth.

Immediately after the Polish general was assigned as commander-in-chief, Lajos Kossuth and the Commission of National Defence (OHB) began to urge Dembiński to launch an attack in order to drive the Austrian troops out of Hungary, but the latter kept postponing the attack, citing various unfounded reasons (such as the fear of a combined attack of the Serbian forces from the South with the Austrian main army from the West). Finally, upon Kossuth's constant urging, he decided to launch the attack on 22 February.

Despite his promising past as a military commander, the appointment of Dembiński proved to be an unfortunate choice. He had no experience conducting an offensive campaign or battle because he only led defensive and retreat operations during his time as a commander. The Lieutenant General's secretive, distrustful nature, and his impulsive, impetuous behavior were not suitable for winning the sympathy of the Hungarian corps commanders. First, he had a quarrel with General Mór Perczel, then he complained about Colonel György Klapka to Kossuth, and then he got into a heated argument with Artur Görgei.

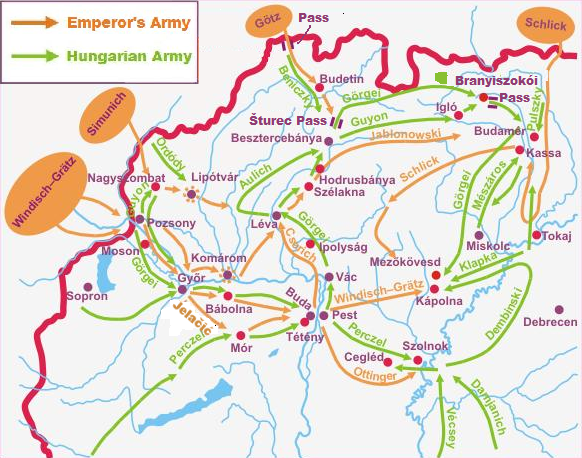
Movements in the Winter Campaign

On the other side of the frontline the situation was the following. On 5 January 1849 the Austrian imperial army (K.u.K.) led by Field Marshal Alfred I, Prince of Windisch-Grätz entered the Hungarian capitals Buda and Pest, the occupied the western, northwestern and central parts of Hungary. Being followed by Austrian forces, the Hungarian Corps of the Upper Danube led by General Artúr Görgei retreated through Northern Hungary, in order to join with the rest of the forces, which tried to defend Eastern Hungary across the left banks of the Tisza river.

But the attack against Hungary was not only from the west. From the north an Austrian corps led by Lieutenant General Franz Schlik entered the country from Galicia at the beginning of December and pushed forward rapidly, soon capturing the important city of Kassa. The Hungarians tried to stop Schlik, but the newly formed Upper Tisza Corps led by the minister of defence, Major General Lázár Mészáros suffered a heavy defeat in the Battle of Kassa from Schlik, who had his way open towards Debrecen, where the Hungarian government retreated. In this very desperate situation, György Klapka took command of the demoralized troops. The Hungarian general broke the Austrians' momentum in the battles of Tokaj and Tarcal, forcing Schlik to retreat to Kassa. At the same time, Dembiński was put in charge of the Upper Danube and the former Bácska and Bánság corps, becoming the new commander-in-chief.

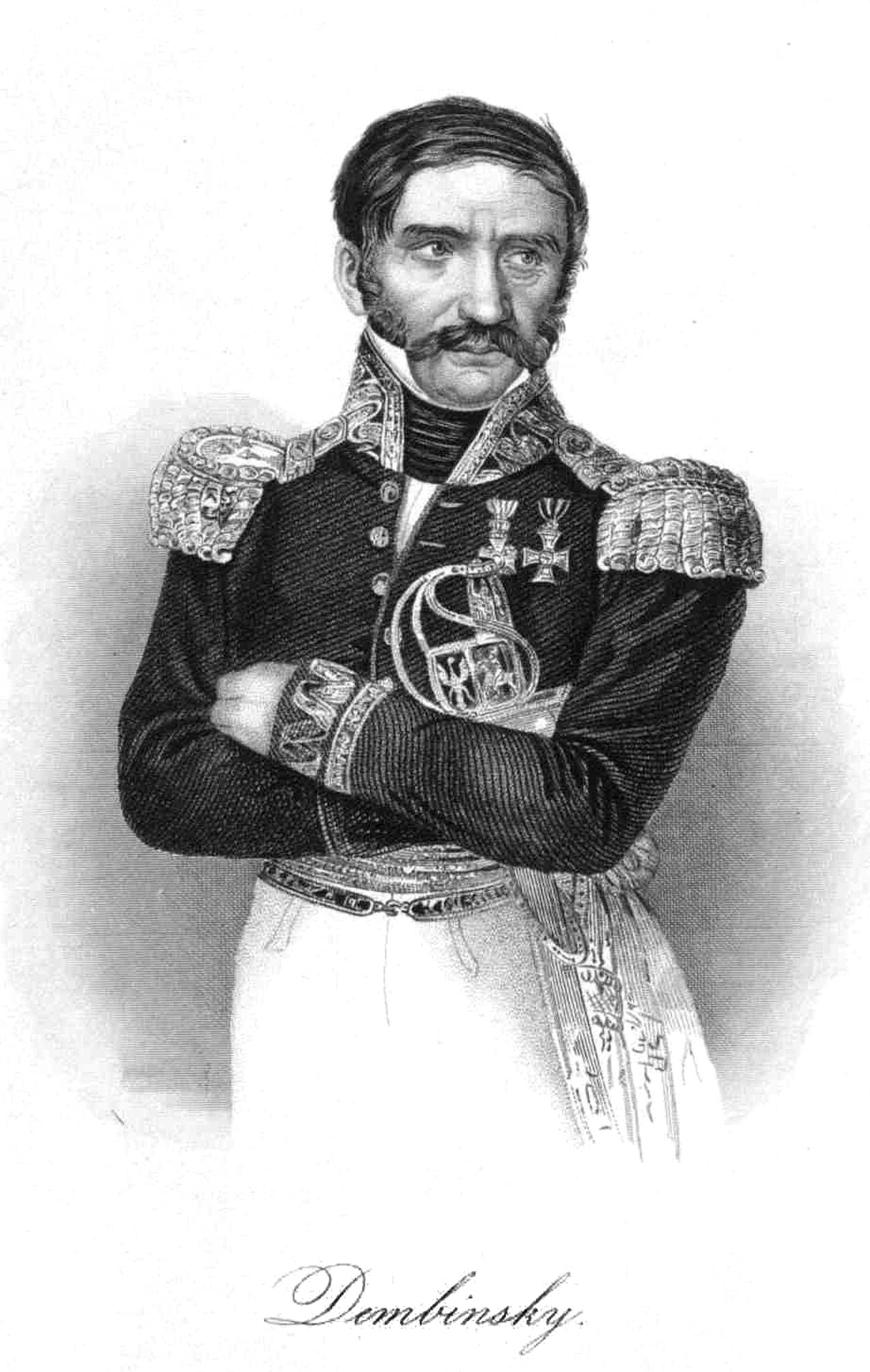
Henryk Dembiński Polish-born, Hungarian-Polish supreme commander in the Battle of Kápolna. After the defeat he lost his position.

After his victory at Branyiszkó, Görgei's Corps of the Upper Danube appeared behind Schlik's troops, threatening to surround, in cooperation with Klapka's troops, the Austrian army. Sensing the threat to Schlik's corps and the activity of the Hungarian troops, Windisch-Grätz moved his troops towards the Tisza river in mid-February.

Dembiński made Tiszafüred his base of operations and intended to fight the decisive battle around Mezőkövesd and Eger. The plan was that, before this, two divisions of the Hungarian army had to carry out a Demonstration (military) against the K.u.K. Brigade defending the city of Szolnok to divide the Austrian main army, by attracting there important enemy units. Then the Hungarian main forces would advance along the Pest highway and cut off the Austrian forces trapped in the Szolnok area, and after the decisive victory around Kápolna and Eger, would liberate the capital. However, Dembiński was so obsessed with his plan that he forbade even the effective pursuit of the isolated Schlik corps, on the assumption that if Schlik was severely defeated, Windisch-Grätz would not dare to move out from Budapest, and then his much-desired battle between Mezőkövesd and Eger would not be fought. Dembiński intended to launch the attack in early March. This explains why, when Klapka tried to attack Schlik's corps from two directions at Pétervására on 24 February, Dembiński ordered one of his columns back, and the desired success was again prevented by the commander-in-chief. At the same time, Dembiński wanted to wait before attacking the main army, because János Damjanich's and Károly Vécsey's divisions would have arrived at Szolnok site by then, in order to carry out the planned diversionary attack, and until then he intended to take up a position along the Tarna river's line with his main force. But surprisingly, he did not wait for that to happen, and on the 24th he had already ordered his troops to advance.

== Prelude ==
In the meantime Schlik also suspected that the Hungarian troops tried to concentrate, preparing a counter-offensive, so he started to advance to get more accurate information but soon realized that the Hungarian forces were more numerous than expected. In the meantime, Windisch-Grätz sent the Colloredo Brigade to reconnoiter, which found Hungarian outposts at Kompolt on 17 February. Then, Arisztid Dessewffy's hussars ambushed the 5th Auersperger Regiment of the K.u.K. Army in the Battle of Kompolt on 18 February, putting them to flight, as a result of which the Colloredo brigade retreated to Hatvan, from where they sent a report of this to Pest. From this report Windisch-Grätz learned on 18–19 February 1849 that the Hungarian main army was concentrated around Mezőkövesd and Eger, and probably intended to attack Pest. As a result of this, Windisch-Grätz started to march towards that region with his troops on 23 February. He wanted to concentrate his troops in the area of Gödöllő and then move on the Hatvan-Hort-Gyöngyös-Kápolna route to meet the Hungarian main forces. The purpose of the Field Marshal was twofold: on the one hand, he wanted to prevent the Hungarian army from concentrating and advancing, and on the other, he wanted to establish contact with Schlik's corps, with which he had hitherto only maintained contact by envoys. However, the orders he issued continued to reflect indecision. On 21 February, he wrote to Schlik that he intended to clash with the Hungarians at Mezőkövesd.

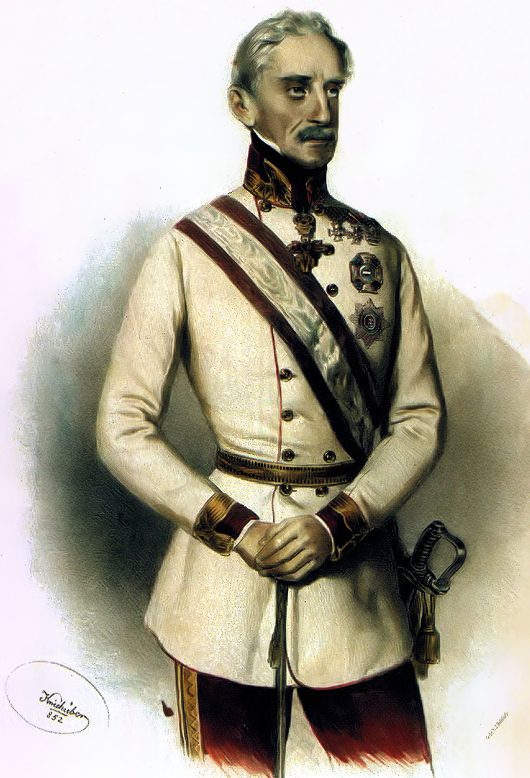
Alfred I, Prince of Windisch-Grätz, leader of the Austrian army. During the Winter Campaign, Joseph Kriehuber's litrograph (1852)

If they accepted the fight and lost, they could retreat towards either Poroszló or Miskolc. In the former case, it was up to him, in the latter to Schlik, to cut off their retreat. If the enemy did not accept the battle, he would use the occasion, according to circumstances, to destroy the bridge at Poroszló, or to cross it, or finally to take some other decision appropriate to the state of affairs. For this attack Windisch-Grätz mobilized the II Corps led by Lieutenant General Ladislaus von Wrbna and the brigade of Lieutenant General Josip Jelačić's corps led by Lieutenant General Karl Zeisberg. The imperial commander-in-chief had only 17,000 soldiers at his disposal for this campaign because he had left considerable forces behind to defend the capital, while he could not take with him the corps of Lieutenant-General Baron Josip Jelačić, who was securing the Danube–Tisza Interfluve, because he needed his soldiers for the attempt to destroy the Tisza bridge at Cibakháza, but was successfully prevented by the troops of Major István Mesterházy and Major Károly Leiningen-Westerburg. For the attack, he also counted on Schlik's corps. The total number of the K.u.K. Army thus deployed, if Schlik managed to join his troops, reached 30,000 men and 165 guns. To secure the operation, the I. Corps had to attempt to destroy the bridge at Cibakháza, mentioned above, which was in the hands of the Hungarian troops.

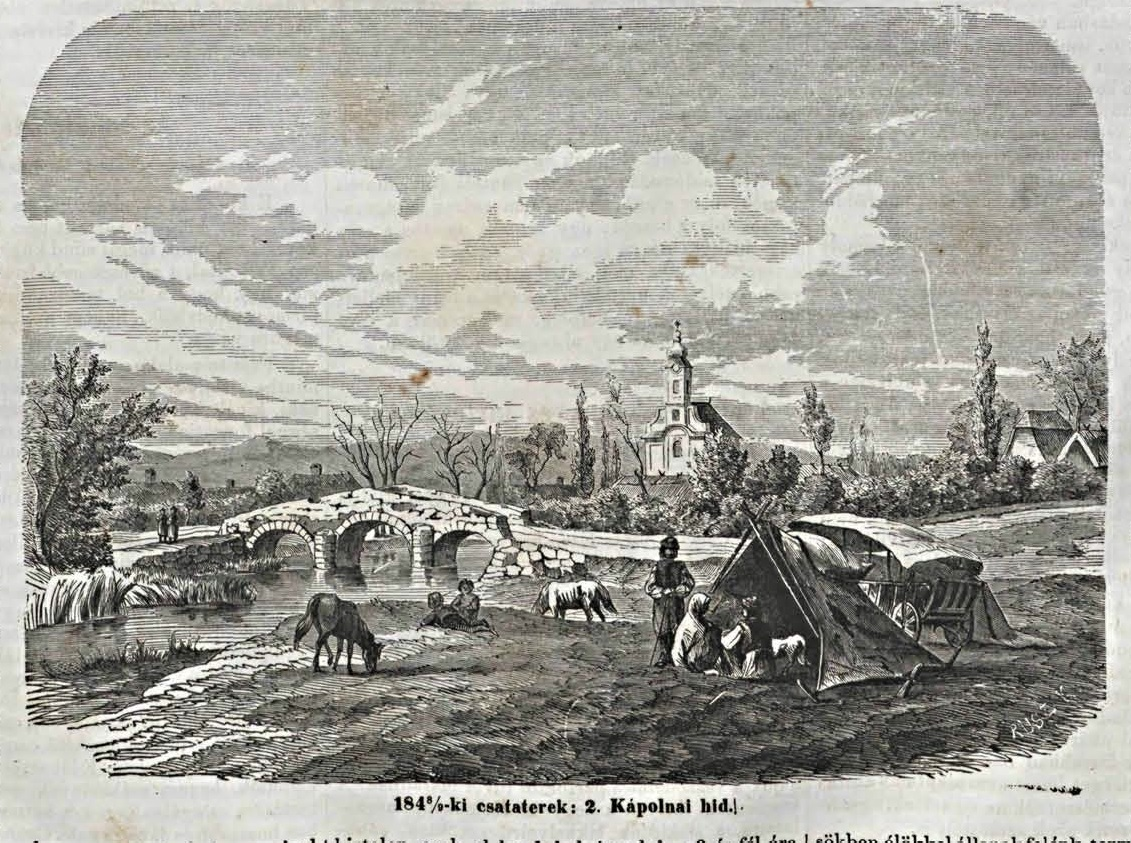
Battlefield of Kápolna. The bridge at Kápolna

The imperial army advanced in two columns, on the Pest-Miskolc road the Csorich Division and the artillery reserve, on the Jászberény-Árokszállás route the Schwarzenberg Division. In the meantime, Schlik retreated to Pétervására and awaited the arrival of the main army. Windisch-Grätz marched to Gyöngyös on 25 February and transferred his headquarters to this place. On this day, he finally met Schlik, with whom he discussed the future war plan. The corps commander's suggestion that he and his troops should join the main army at Kerecsend instead of Gyöngyös, marching through Verpelét, was accepted by the commander-in-chief. They agreed that Wrbna's two columns would advance from Gyöngyös and Árokszállás to Kápolna and Kál; Zeisberg's column was to advance from Tarnaörs towards Heves. Parrot's brigade, consisting of 3 battalions, 4 cavalry companies, and 1 battery, would march from Gyöngyöspata to Gyöngyös and put itself at the disposal of Lieutenant-General Wrbna; the rest of Schlik's corps had to advance along the Tarna valley to Verpelét and thus to come into contact with the main army. The next morning, Csorich's division had to cross the Tarna at Kápolna and Major General Edmund, Prince of Schwarzenberg's troops at Kál. The main force was to be covered from the south by Zeisberg's brigade. The two commanders did not expect that the Tarna line would be in Hungarian hands by the morning of the 26th. Windisch-Grätz had been informed that the enemy with about 40,000 men was in the vicinity of Mezőkövesd, Maklár and Eger, that Poroszló was held by them and that an enemy stronger column was advancing towards Heves.

According to Dembiński's orders, the Hungarian main army began to gather around Mezőkövesd. He held back one division of Répássy's corps to defend the Tiszafüred bridge, but ordered the other troops to the Tarna line. Görgei's forces, meanwhile, were slowly approaching from the Miskolc area. As Dembiński had originally planned the offensive against the Austrian main forces for early March, he was not worried about a slower-than-planned troop concentration. By 25 February, some of his units were already at the Tarna river, controlling the bridges over the stream. However, the operation did not run smoothly, the troops were not deployed according to their corps, with the divisions from different corps deployed side by side, disconnecting in this way the corps commanders from the command of their troops, which made cooperation between units difficult in the following battle, many units fighting on their own. So Dembiński also disrupted the Hungarian military organization that had been established by the beginning of February 1849, he moved the divisions under his command without the knowledge of the corps commanders, so the subordination relations were not clear and the sub-commanders did not know which orders were to be executed.

=== Opposing forces ===
The Hungarian army

Interestingly, although Dembiński had earlier predicted that the decisive battle with the Austrians would be fought near Kápolna when this began he was not at all ready to fight. The Hungarian force consisted of about 43,000 men and 150 pieces of artillery and was made up of four corps, but only three corps could be counted on in the battle. The total number of the I (Klapka), II (Répásy), and VII (Görgei) Corps, which were close enough to participate in the battle, reached 36,000 men and 136 guns. As we will see below, during the upcoming battle the Hungarian units arrived at the battlefield gradually, like half of them on the first day, another part of the troops on the evening of the first day, and participated in the battle in the next day, while another section of the army arrived only after the battle.

Dembiński failed to concentrate his troops. When the two armies suddenly met on 26 February at Kompolt on the Tarna line, only a total of 7 of the 23 brigades of the three Hungarian corps were on the battlefield. However, with appropriate action, 13 additional brigades could arrive on the battle scene that evening or the next day.

Hungarian troops in combat on 26 February

- I. corps:

- Dessewffy division: 4 1/2 infantry battalions, 5 cavalry companies, 1360 horses, 15 cannons = 6451 soldiers;
- Máriássy division: 5 infantry battalions, 6 cavalry companies, 450 horses, 16 cannons = 5200 soldiers;

- II. corps:

- Szekulits division: 4 infantry battalions, 4 cavalry companies, 400 horses, 16 cannons = 3650 soldiers;

- VII. corps:

- Poeltenberg division: 3 infantry battalions, 8 cavalry companies, 716 horses, 16 cannons = 3768 soldiers;

Total: 16 infantry battalions, 23 cavalry companies, 2926 horses, 63 cannons = 19,069 soldiers.

Hungarian troops arriving on 27 February

- VII. corps:

- Aulich division: 3 infantry battalions, 8 cavalry companies, 802 horses, 16 cannons = 4306 soldiers;
- Weissl division: 1 infantry battalion, 140 horses, 3 cannons = 1247 soldiers;

Total involved in the battle: 20 infantry battalions, 31 cavalry companies, 3868 horses, 80 cannons = 24,622 soldiers.

Hungarian troops arrived on 27 February at the end of the battle

- VII. corps:

- Kmety division: 5 infantry battalions, 6 cavalry companies, 764 horses, 23 cannons = 4137 soldiers;
- Guyon division: 4 infantry battalions, 2 cavalry companies, 307 horses, 21 cannons = 4042 soldiers;

Other units too far from the battlefield

- II. corps:

- Hertelendy division: 4 infantry battalions, 4 cavalry companies, 416 horses, 11 cannons = 4900 soldiers;

- I. corps:

- Sulcz division: 3 1/2 infantry battalions, 1 cavalry company, 192 horses, 11 cannons = 2513 soldiers;

The Austrian army

The 30,000-strong Austrian army was inferior in number, but it had a much more powerful artillery, both in terms of the number of guns and the caliber of the guns. However, this disadvantage of the Hungarians was compensated by the fact that they had almost one and a half times more soldiers. So there was a chance for the Hungarian army, if it was concentrated on the battlefield, to face the imperial attack with a chance of victory.

Austrian troops at Kápolna on 26 February

- II. corps:

- Csorich division:

- Wyss brigade: 4 infantry battalions, 1 cavalry companies, 1 1/2 battery;
- Colloredo brigade: 4 infantry battalions, 1 cavalry companies, 1 1/2 battery;
- Artillery reserve of the division: 3 batteries.

- Schwarzenberg division:

- Dietrich brigade: 3 1/2 infantry battalions, 1 1/2 battery;
- Schütte brigade: 2 infantry battalions, 1 battery;
- Bellegrade brigade: 11 cavalry companies, 1 battery;
- Artillery reserve of the division: 1 battery.

- Artillery reserve of the corps: 6 batteries.

Corps total:: 13 1/2 infantry battalions, 13 cavalry companies, 17 batteries (102 cannons) = 15,000 soldiers.

Austrian troops arriving on 27 February

- III. corps:

- Fiedler brigade: -
- Pergen brigade: -
- Deim brigade: -
- Kriegern brigade: -
- Parrot brigade: -

Corps total:: 12 infantry battalions, 16 cavalry companies, 8 1/2 batteries (51 cannons) = 13,000 soldiers.

- Zeisberg brigade: 2000 soldiers, 12 cannons.

Participated in the combat: 21,640 soldiers, 147 cannons.

=== The two armies positioning before the battle ===
The Sulcz Division of the I Corps guarded the passes around Eger. VII Corps Aulich's division was in Maklár, Guyon's division in Mezőkövesd, and Kmety's division in Bükkábrány. These four divisions could therefore have been sent to the battlefield the next day if they would have been ordered to do so at the right time.

On the first day of the battle, a 17,000-strong Honvéd Army lined up on the Tarna line. The division of the I Corps led by Colonel Arisztid Dessewffy took up a position at Verpelét, while a small detachment guarded the Sirok Pass. The Poeltenberg division was stationed at Aldebrő and Feldebrő, the Máriássy division at Kápolna, and the Szekulits division at Kál. The latter unit consisted of only one brigade because the other half guarded the bridgehead at Poroszló. Around 22-23 thousand Imperial soldiers marched against them, on two routes from Pétervására Schlik with about 10 thousand men, while Windisch-Grätz from Gyöngyös was coming with the Wrbna corps of 12,000 men.

The Imperial and Royal main forces started their march from Gyöngyös at 10 o'clock in the morning.

According to the order issued, the left flank column, which was formed by the Csorich Division, the Schütte Brigade, and the artillery reserve under the command of Lieutenant-General Wrbna, i.e. a total of 10 battalions, 4 cavalry companies, and 78 guns, set out on the morning of 26 February from Gyöngyös towards Kápolna, with the Wyss Brigade in the lead, followed by the Colloredo Brigade. The artillery reserve with the Schütte Brigade left an hour later; the left flank was secured by 2 infantry and 2 kaiserjäger companies under the command of Captain Brandenstein, and was directed to Verpelét via Sár and Domoszló, to join again with its brigade at Kápolna after re-establishing the connection with the head of the III Corps after the latter's arrival. The vanguard of the right flank column under Schwarzenberg, led by Lieutenant Colonel Nositz, left at 9 o'clock in the morning from Árokszállás to Kál, followed shortly after by the rest of the column. The Parrot Brigade had set off from Gyöngyöspata to arrive at Gyöngyös, to guard the headquarters with all its trains, field hospitals, magazines, and ammunition depots installed there.

== Battle ==
=== 26 February ===
The Hungarian outposts reported the approach of the enemy at around 12 noon on 26 February. The Poeltenberg Division of VII Corps moved into Feldebrő at about 12 noon, and took a short rest here. The calm was ended by the sound of cannon fire from the direction of the Kompolt forest at around 2 pm. The first Hungarian cannon shot was fired by the Szekulits division in the vicinity of the Kompolt forest. Poeltenberg rushed his troops to cross the Tarna. The first Austrians to arrive belonged to the Csorich Division, who were advancing along the highway, and first encountered the Hungarian troops deploying along the Tarna line at about 2 p.m.

Lieutenant-General Wrbna, having ascertained the enemy's proximity, sent forward the 2 3/4 cavalry companies assigned to the Vanguard Brigade and the 2nd Cavalry Battery in the direction of Kápolna, and deployed in battle formation with the Wyss Brigade on the right of the highway and the Colloredo Brigade on the left.

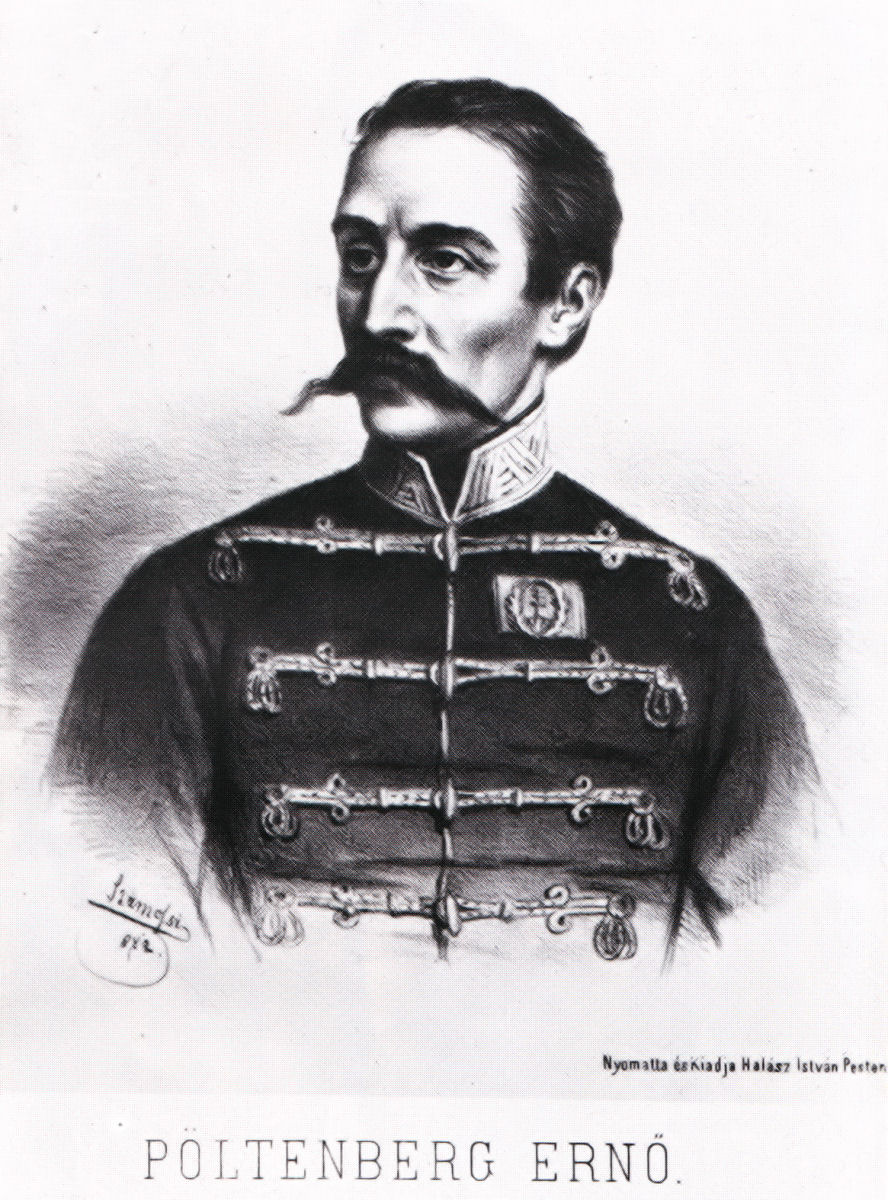
A lithograph of Ernő Poeltenberg by Elek Szamossy

Under the cover of the forest to the north, the Hungarian center attempted to embrace the enemy immediately at the beginning of the battle, but Poeltenberg did not ordered his troops to occupy the forest. General Colloredo, who was on the lead of Csorich's left flank, having noticed the manoeuvre, first sent a company of the 6th Kaiserjäger Battalion to push back the Hungarians. Seeing that the battle was desperately wavering and that neither side could gain a decisive advantage, Lieutenant General Csorich, directed 4 more companies and 1 reserve battery into the forest led by Major Salis, which, on their way suffered heavy losses from the Hungarian mortar and shell fire. However, due to the heroism of the 1st, 14th and 31st battalions, the outcome of the battle gradually began to be in favor of the Hungarians. During this desperate, fierce forest battle, along the highway, in the middle of the battle line, in the large gap created between the Wyss and Colloredo brigades mostly an artillery duel was fought between the Hungarians and the Austrians. To fill this gap and to decide the battle in the forest, Csorich was finally forced to deploy there the Schütte Brigade, which was his reserve, and sent there also most of the artillery reserve of the army. Thus, now a total of 38 Austrian infantry companies and 45 guns were fighting against Poeltenberg's troops, hugely outnumbering them. The Hungarian Honvéds retreated from the forest to the neighbouring vineyards to escape the onslaught of 10 grenadier companies. The officers managed to regroup the troops before sunset and prepared to retake the forest. Three attempts were made by Poeltenberg's troops, but they were repulsed by enemy's superiority.

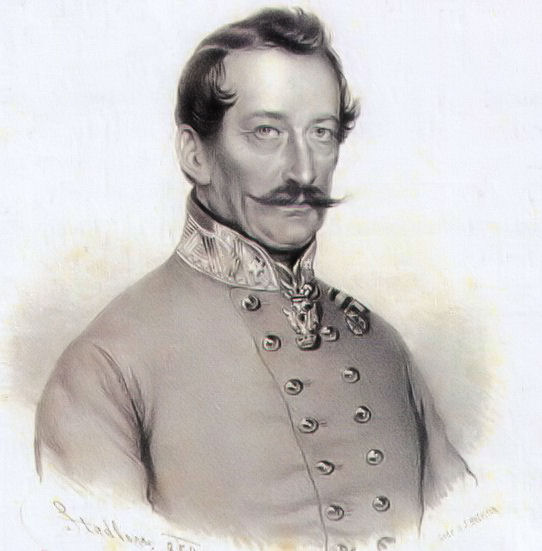
Franz Wyss, who died in the Battle of Csorna. Contemporary lithograph

Colonel Poeltenberg, still not giving up his intention to reenter in the possession of the forest, with 2 battalions at his disposal, (Note: According to the historian József Bánlaky (Breit), three battalions went on the attack, but recent works, for example, the article of Ferenc Kopka, point that there were two battalions.) one of which, supported by a battery to carry through the actual assault in the first line of battle, and the second of which, was in reserve behind the right flank of the former, attempted yet a fourth and final assault against the forest in question. The two battalions crossed the Tarna under heavy fire from the enemy artillery, but Major Kronenberg did not wait for this new attack, but went with 5 companies in a frontal attack against the Hungarians, while Captain Feldegg attacked their right flank with 3 companies. The latter were crushed by the Hungarian second line driving the routing Austrians northwards.

The wavering battle that had been going on since early afternoon then took another unexpected turn. Another Austrian reinforcement arrived, this time from the north. A detachment of about 1000 men was led by Captain Brandenstein. These troops originally advanced from the direction of Domoszló with the aim of capturing Verpelét. The Austrian detachment encountered at Verpelét the much stronger Dessewffy division, and after a short skirmish, seeing that they had no chance of success here, they turned southeast towards Feldebrő. He appeared on the battlefield at the right time and place for the Austrians and thoroughly confused the Hungarian Honvéds. With the help of the Barndenstein detachment, Colloredo drove Poeltenberg's exhausted soldiers to the left bank of the Tarna by nightfall. Moreover, the patrols sent out by Poeltenberg, returned with the erroneous report that Kápolna was already in enemy possession, which made the Hungarian lieutenant colonel, to destroy the bridges and evacuate Aldebrő and Feldebrő and retreat towards Kerecsend.

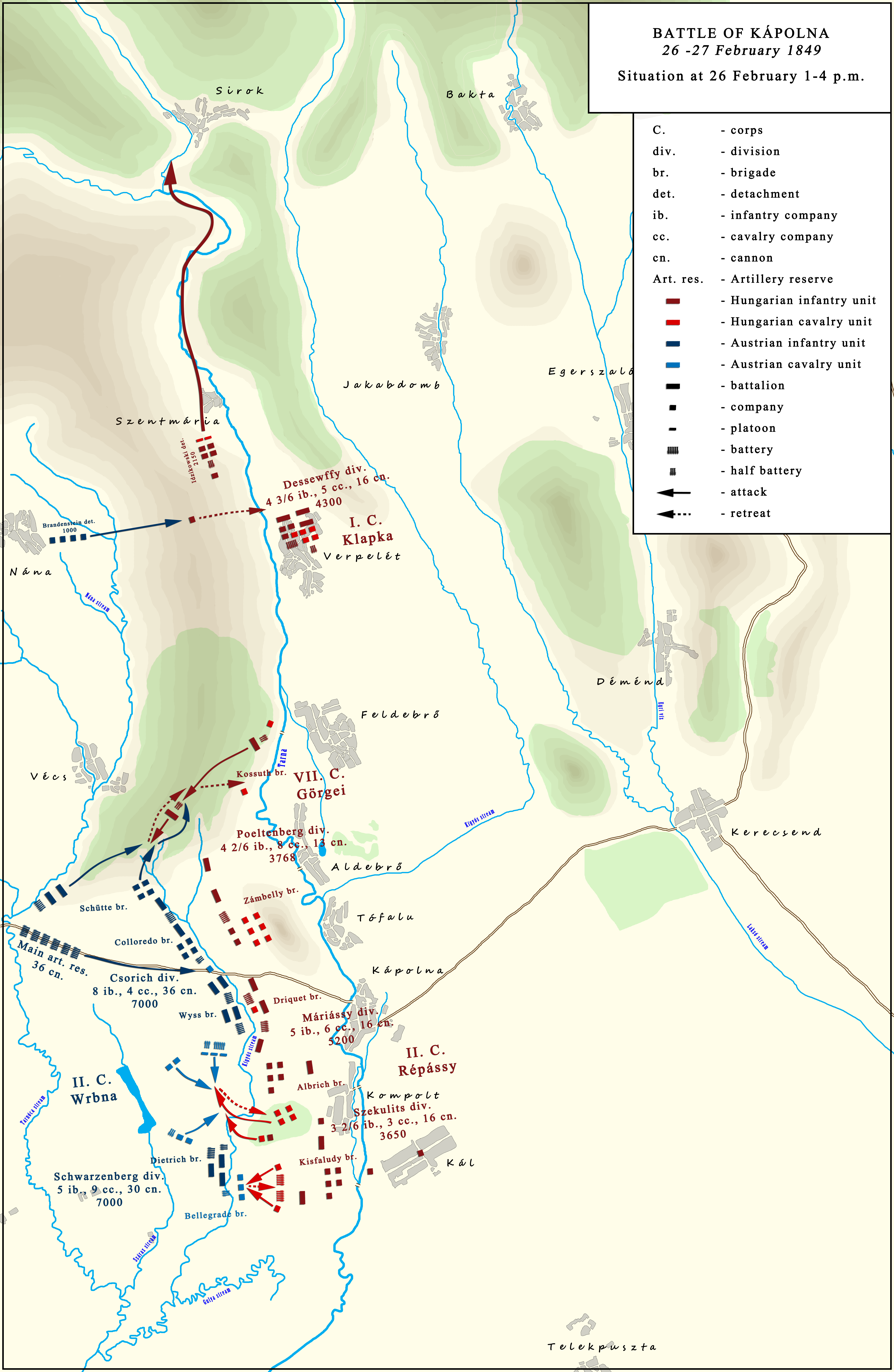
Battle of Kápolna. The situation on 26 February 1–4 pm

At the beginning of the battle, the Driquet Brigade belonging to the I Corps' Máriássy Division was positioned on the western bank of Tarna, between the Kompolt Forest and the vineyards of Kápolna. Colonel János Máriássy also had at his disposal four companies of the 1st (Imperial) Hussar Regiment. On the news of the imperial troops' approach, Máriássy, crossing the Tarna, took up a combat position on both sides of the Gyöngyös road, on the heights from the right bank of the river, positioning his right wing on the same level as Tótfalu and leaning his left wing on a small wood on the left of the highway. A similar action was taken by Szekulits, who took up a position on the right bank of the Tarna in front of the Kompolt and Kál villages, and with his withdrawn left flank establishing the connection with Máriássy's division at the aforementioned wood.

The 6 Austrian batteries, concentrated in the middle of the battle line, fired so effectively that the advance of parts of the Máriássy Division along the highway proved unsuccessful. To the right of the artillery batteries massed on the center of the Austrian battle line, the Wyss Brigade deployed into two battle lines, each line formed by two battalions each, divided into platoon columns. It was mainly the Hungarian artillery that inflicted heavy losses on this brigade, as well as on the cavalry and the accompanying 2. Cavalry Battery, which were advanced close to the Hungarian lines at the beginning of the battle. Wrbna therefore deployed, in addition to the aforesaid battery, the 3. twelve-pounder Battery, and the 10. six-pounder Battery, which were reinforced by three more batteries; so that soon the Austrian batteries got the upper hand, although Máriássy's artillery, which had meanwhile increased to five batteries, continued the uneven fight for a long time with great perseverance. Despite the superiority of the enemy artillery Máriássy's inferior troops managed to stop the Austrian advance on their sector.

In the first hours of the battle, the Wyss brigade of the Csorich division and the Dietrich brigade of the Schwarzenberg division, coming from two different directions, forgot to occupy the Kompolt forest which lay between them. Máriássy realized this and tried to break into the gap in the front line with 4 infantry, 5 cavalry and 2 batteries, and thus tried to disrupt the Austrian deployment. Under the cover of the Kompolt Forest, 4 companies of the Imperial Hussars, sent by Máriássy, had already reached the second line of the Austrian battle line when they were spotted. General Wyss gave orders to Major Baron Baselli to attack the advancing enemy in the face with his squadron of Uhlans, while he, supported by the effective fire of 1 1/2 batteries, attacked his flank with 3 platoons of Chevau-légers under the command of Colonel William Albert, 1st Prince of Montenuovo. Baselli's uhlans managed to disperse not only the leading squadron of the Alexander Hussars regiment, but also one of the infantry companies, which tried to defend themselves by forming an infantry square. In response, Máriássy himself took the lead of the now reinforced Alexander Hussars and drove back the uhlan troops. The cavalrymen were fighting mixed up, so the Austrian artillery was unable to intervene. Just when it seemed that success was finally in favour of the Hungarians, a cavalry detachment of Schwarzenberg's column appeared on one side, and on the other Colonel Montenuovo's chevau-légers, whose determined charge forced the hussars, which were fighting already without much order because of the preemptive attack of the Austrian uhlans, to retreat. In addition, the unit led by General Wyss engaged in a heavy artillery duel with the Hungarian troops. The initial Hungarian superiority in the fight was countered by the Imperials' deployment of batteries from the artillery reserve, which resulted in 5 batteries pouring fire on the Hungarian positions. In this way, they managed to neutralize the batteries on Máriássy's left flank, which also disturbed the other troops of the latter. This was compounded by the fact that a battalion of Schwarzenberg's column, engaged in an otherwise still undecided firefight, was also ordered to attack the Kompolt Forest under the lead of Major Regelsberg. In the end, the division led by Máriássy retreated, first to the high ground in front of Kompolt, then to a position in front of Kápolna, which was still on the west bank of the Tarna. So the Hungarians retreated, but then the Imperial Hussars led by Máriássy stopped the pursuing K.u.K. cavalry.

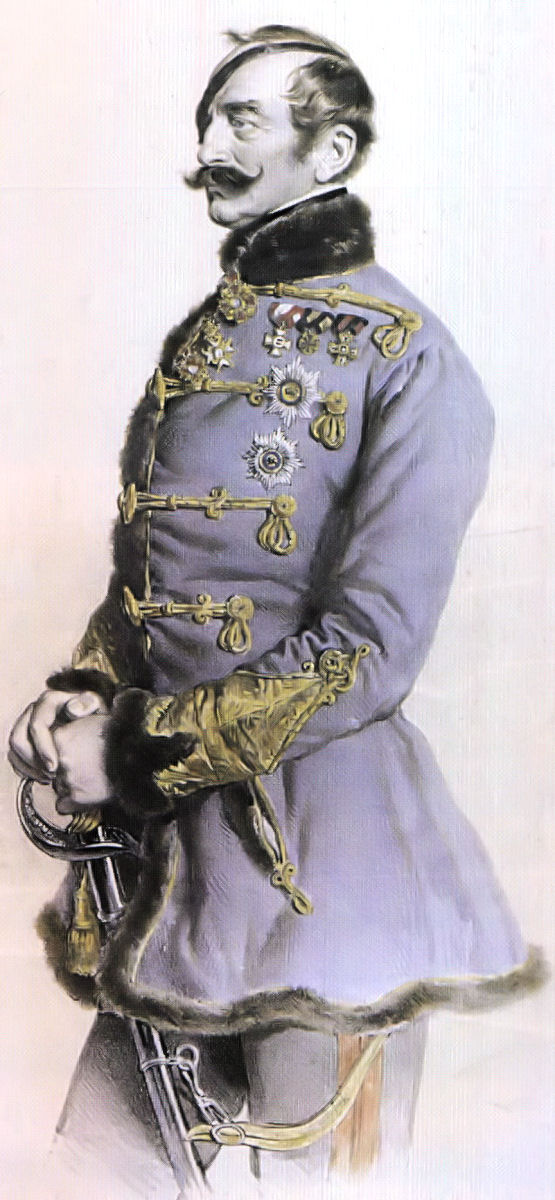
Franz Schlik, a lithograph by Josef Kriehuber

The Kisfaludy brigade of the II Corps' Szekulits Division, was deployed at Kál, between the village and the Tarna stream. At this section, from the direction of Árokszállás, Major General Schwarzenberg's division went on the attack. Schwarzenberg's column came across the cavalry detachment forming the vanguard of Szekulits's division behind the Tarnóca stream, at the Nagyút farm, which quickly fled without putting up any resistance. Schwarzenberg followed the retreating troops as far as the stream flowing down from Vécs towards Zsadány, in front of which the Dietrich Brigade formed up in two battle lines, with 1 battery on each flank. Lieutenant-Colonel István Szekulits, who personally commanded the brigade, crossed the Tarna with his troops at the first cannon shot and confronted the K.u.K. troops. A brief cavalry skirmish broke out between the Uhlans, who formed the Imperial vanguard led by Count Bellegrade, and the Hungarian Hussars at the very beginning of the battle. Apart from that, on this part of the battlefield, nothing important was fought with the exception of an artillery duel. The Szekulits division held its positions until the evening. This was facilitated because Zeisberg's column, although it could easily have done so, did not take at all part in that day's battle. The aforementioned column reached only Méra and Boconád instead of Heves on the morning of the 26th, from where Zeisberg went to Gyöngyös to personally receive further instructions from Windisch-grätz. Instead of him, Colonel Liubimiresko, at the sound of the cannon fire from the direction of Kál, led his column forward to Nagyút, from where, in the evening, he retreated again to Méra and Boconád without firing a single shot. Thanks to these, the Szekulits division, although it was inferior to its opponent in both numbers and artillery, on the first day of the battle held its positions, with its inferior artillery won superiority over the enemy, inflicting heavy losses on them.

Despite the mistakes (as we have seen, the commander-in-chief was the person who particularly "excelled" at them), the Hungarian army fought well on 26 February. The Hungarian commanders of the divisions, brigades, battalions, companies heroically resisted the Austrian overwhelming force, and for much of the day managed to hold the line of the Tarna River, which was important because the western side of the river dominated the eastern one with its higher hills. The night arrived with the fight far from being decided, and there was a chance that, on the next day, the Hungarian army would win the battle with its much waited for reinforcements.

=== The night from 26th to 27 February ===
In the first day's battle, which remained undecided, the entire II Corps of the Austrians and 2 battalions of the III Corps took an active part, numbering about 14,000 men, of which 1,500 were cavalry and 102 guns; on the Hungarian side, the divisions of Szekulits, Máriássy, and Poeltenberg participated, and from the Dessewffy division only Idzikowski's detachment got into the fight; in total, about 13,500 men - among them 2,250 cavalry - and 52 guns, i.e. the two opposing forces, apart from the artillery (in which the Austrians had superiority), were about equal. The only serious fighting along the entire length of the 15,000 paces long battle line was in the woods in front of Debrő-Tótfalu and Kompolt; on the southern flank, between Schwarzenberg and Szekulits and along the highway, there was mostly only artillery duel, and the cavalry confrontations took place in the area of the Kompolt forest.

The whole day Windisch-Grätz was in Gyöngyös, busy with the affairs of the army, and unaware of what was happening at Kápolna, and it was only from Wrbna's report in the evening he learned that only a few hours from his headquarters, one of the decisive battles of the war had begun between his own troops and the Hungarians. The commander-in-chief was particularly worried about Schlik after Wrbna had reported his non-arrival to his corps, and so the officers from the Austrian headquarters feared that the one-eyed lieutenant-general might be captured on his way back from their meeting, leaving his brigades without the necessary command and instructions.

For a long time also the Hungarian commander-in-chief had no information that the battle started. Dembiński, was having lunch with Görgei at Canon Sándor Lévay's in Eger when he heard the first cannon shot, but even then he did not believe that the battle had broken out, and when the news came, he was surprised himself: at first he did not believe the messenger who brought the news.

Dembiński, together with the chief of staff of the army Lieutenant József Bayer, drew up the next day's measures, according to which Aulich had to leave Maklár for Kál during the night to reinforce the left wing, and there, together with Szekulits, to prevent the enemy from crossing the Tarna; Máriássy to hold at Kápolna, Poeltenberg to go back to Debrő, prevent Schlik from joining with Wrbna on the Domoszló-Verpelét road, whereupon he will receive further orders from Klapka, who, taking up position with Dessewffy's division at Verpelét, will block Schlik's advance; Schulz's division to defend Eger by occupying Egerszólát and Egerbakta, and with the remainder of his division to stay at Klapka's disposal, and finally Guyon and Kmety had to march immediately from Mezőkövesd and Bükkábrány towards the battlefield: the former to Kápolna in support of Máriássy, the latter to Kerecsend and form the reserve.

According to the measures issued, Máriássy's division, because Kápolna, which lay in a depression, was difficult to defend, was placed in battle order on the hills to the east of the village, and the village itself was held only by 1 battalion and 2 guns. Arriving at Kál early in the morning, Aulich assigned 1 battalion to Kompolt to re-establish communications with Máriássy's troops, while with the rest of his troops, including Szekulits' division, which was to be placed under his command by the order of the staff, he took up position in front of Kál. Klapka, with Dessewffy's division, which, apart from Idzikowski's detachment, which was defending the Sirok Pass, numbered only 3,600 infantry, 500 cavalry, and 16 guns, at dawn he was positioned at Verpelét as follows: the 1st Don Miguel and 43rd Home Guard Battalions occupied the town itself, with a 1/2 six-pounder battery stationed along its northern flank to hold the bridge of the Tarna under fire; the remainder of the division took up a waiting position on the high ground east of the town.

Dembiński and Görgei who was with him tried to move as many troops as possible to the Tarna line, but Dembiński did not have adequate staff, or courier service. He himself only reached the battlefield by using Görgei's chariot.

Dembiński issued his orders at 7 p.m. to move the troops from the rear forward towards the battlefield. Dembiński was unable to get his orders everywhere due to the lack of a courier service, and Görgei himself, despite himself being a general, was forced to get on his horse and play the role of an envoy. Görgei assumed responsibility for informing Guyon and Poeltenberg about their future positioning on the battlefield, and immediately rode towards Mezőkövesd via Kerecsend. By the time he reached Guyon's division and returned to the battlefield, it was 10 in the morning. The delivery of the orders to Aulich and Kmety was entrusted to Dembiński's courier returning to Eger, from where they were to be forwarded to Maklár and Bükkábrány by two of Görgei's orderly officers. It was already certain that with such an "order-transferring system", it was not possible to expect the arrival of the troops, which were at a greater distance in time.

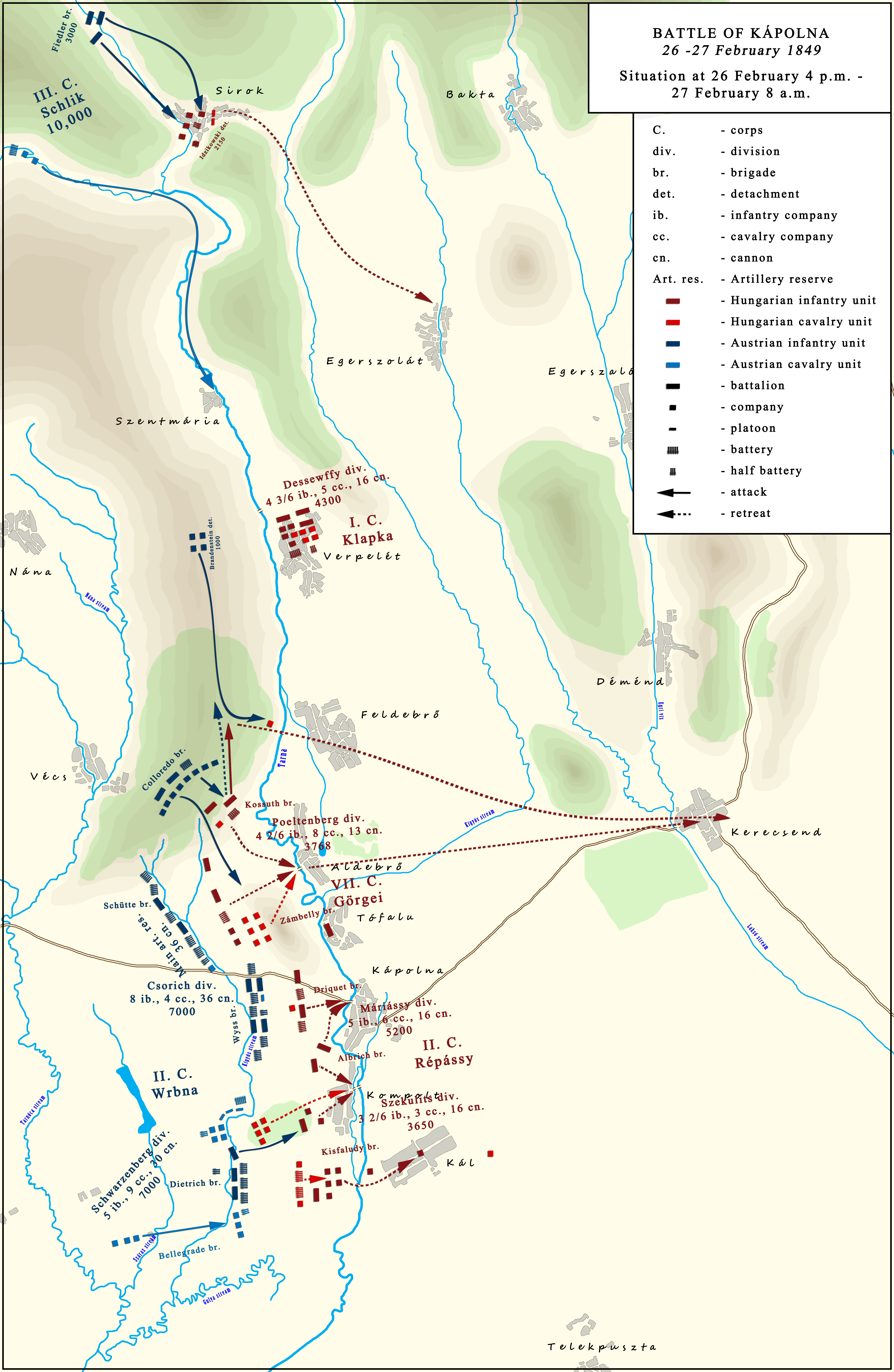
Battle of Kápolna. The situation on 26 February 4 pm - 27 February 8 am

Thus, only the Sulcz and Aulich divisions received their orders in time. Thus, part of the Sulcz Division joined the troops defending Verpelét, while the Aulich Division marched towards Kál.

By the 27th of February, Dembiński had personally taken command of the center, while Görgeit was sent to Kál to command the right flank, and General Lajos Aulich was put in charge of the left flank. After nightfall, Dembiński ordered all Honvéd units back to the eastern bank of the Tarna. This proved to be a bad decision, as the west bank was higher everywhere, giving the imperial artillery a huge advantage in the next day's battle.

The night passed in silence, but a strange event disturbed the Hungarian troops. Poeltenberg, who was pushed back to the left bank of the Tarna by the imperial infantry, temporarily lost contact with Máriássy, who was stationed next to him. After the guns fell silent at Kápolna, the General thought the village had fallen into Austrian hands. The Hussar scouts sent out to get information, got lost in the dark night and did not return, adding to his worries. As a result, terrified of being surrounded, Poeltenberg ordered his troops to retreat towards Kerecsend. During the retreat he did not encounter any fleeing Hungarian soldiers, so he began to suspect that he might have been mistaken. Finally, he hurried personally to Kápolna, where Dembiński met him and they discussed about the situation. After this he returned to his division at about 3 a.m, which, meanwhile, had retreated as far as Kerecsend. After a short rest, they marched back to the Tarna line at 7 am. This incident prevented his troops from properly resting before the fight started again on the next day. The Hungarian army was extremely lucky that the retreat of Poeltenberg and the gaping hole in the Hungarian frontline were not noticed by the imperial forces.

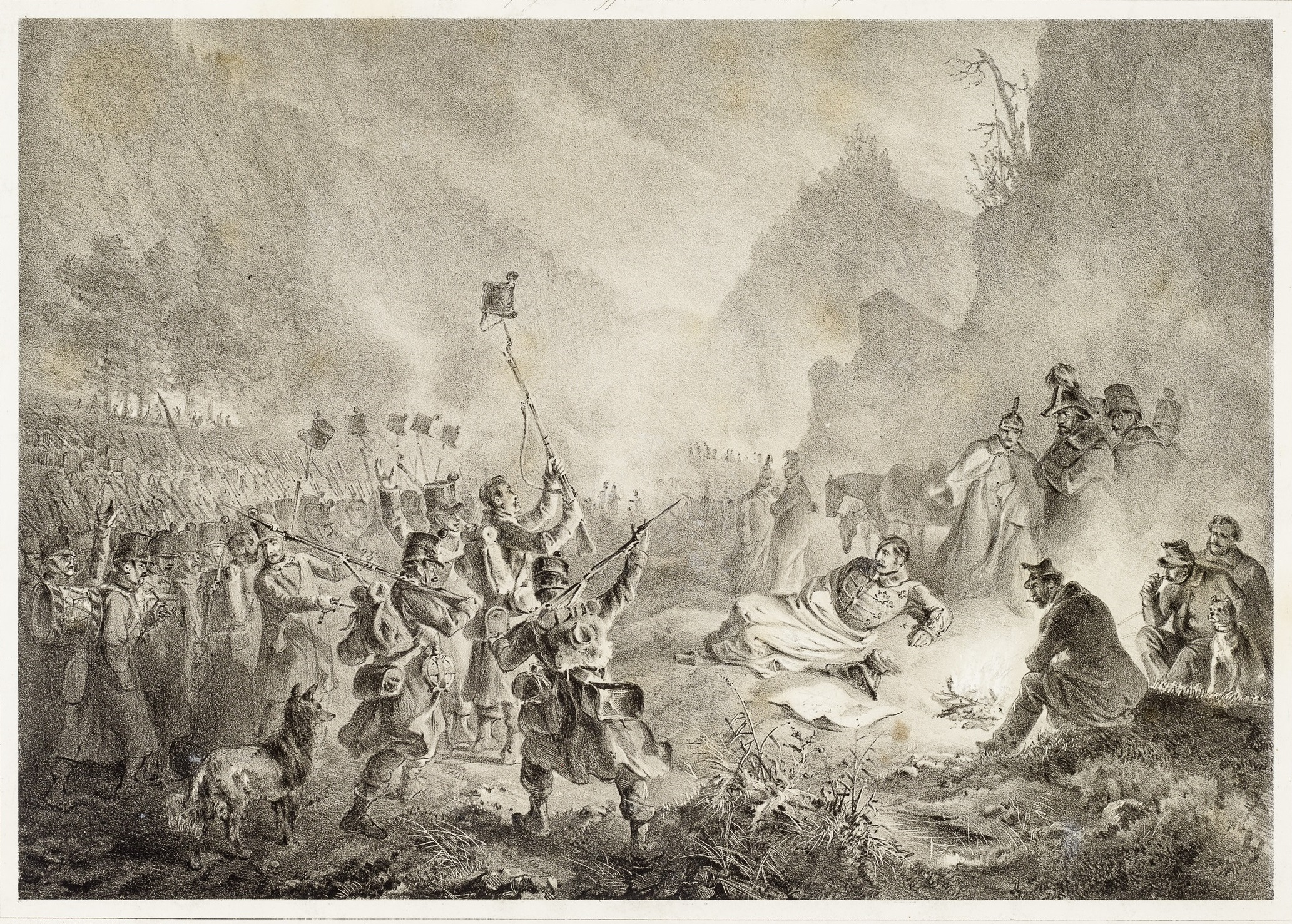
Schlik's bivouac in the night from 26 to 27 February after they occupied the Sirok pass Bachmann Hochmann

During the night, however, there was an unfavorable change in the situation on the Hungarian side. Before the battle, Klapka sent only a very small detachment to occupy the Sirok Pass. A detachment of 4 companies of infantry, 1/2 company of hussars and a half three-pounder battery from the Dessewffy's division was there, and it was getting dusk. It was then that the Schlik corps attacked them.

After his discussion with Windisch-Grätz on the 25th, Schlik did not arrive back to his corps in Pétervására until noon on the 26th, from where he sent orders to march, and his troops, with the Kriegern Brigade in the lead, started towards the battlefield in the afternoon. Schlik sent 2 battalions of border guards to the high ground on the eastern side of the strait to take control of the Sirok pass, and at nightfall, after a third battalion had been ordered to support them, they threw themselves on Sirok with a terrible battle cry. Under the influence of surprise and darkness, Idzikowski led his panicked troops back with the utmost haste, but not to the south to Verpelét where his division stationed, but towards the east, to Egerszolát. For this reason, Dessewffy had no information of his troops being driven away, and, leaving the bulk of his division at Verpelét, he turned his attention from there during the day to the road to Domoszló. Dessewffy spent the night at Verpelét, probably without any idea of what was happening on his right to the detachment of Idzikowski. Schlik pushed 2 battalions forward to Tarnaszentmária during the night, and with the corps fully arrived by 2 o'clock at night at Sirok, where he set up camp.

This put Schlik on the flank of the Hungarian troops stationing at Verpelét.

=== 27 February ===
The battle continued on 27 February. Windisch-Grätz hurried early in the morning of the 27th to the battlefield of Kapolna, but first, he ordered Parrot to send his 4 cavalry companies there, to take up a position with the remaining 3 battalions of his brigade, 1 cavalry company and 1 battery on the high ground east of Gyöngyös, and to continue his raids in the direction of Parád, Verpelét and Heves. The aim of the Austrian commander-in-chief was to capture Kápolna, thereby breaking through the Hungarian front line's center and crush the Hungarian right flank. By this time he knew that Schlik had captured the Sirok pass and was heading with his corps towards Verpelét, the most outlying position on the Hungarian right flank. Arriving near the village, Windisch-Grätz first of all surveyed the enemy position, on the basis of which he decided to make the main attack at Kápolna as soon as Schlik's intervention became certain. And Schlik appeared at the right moment; already at 8 a.m., a huge cannon thundering could be heard from Verpelét, indicating that the joining of the two corps in the battle took place under the most favorable conditions and circumstances because the III Corps' direction of advance was to the right and to the rear of the Hungarian army, which could not be a better placing for the Austrians.

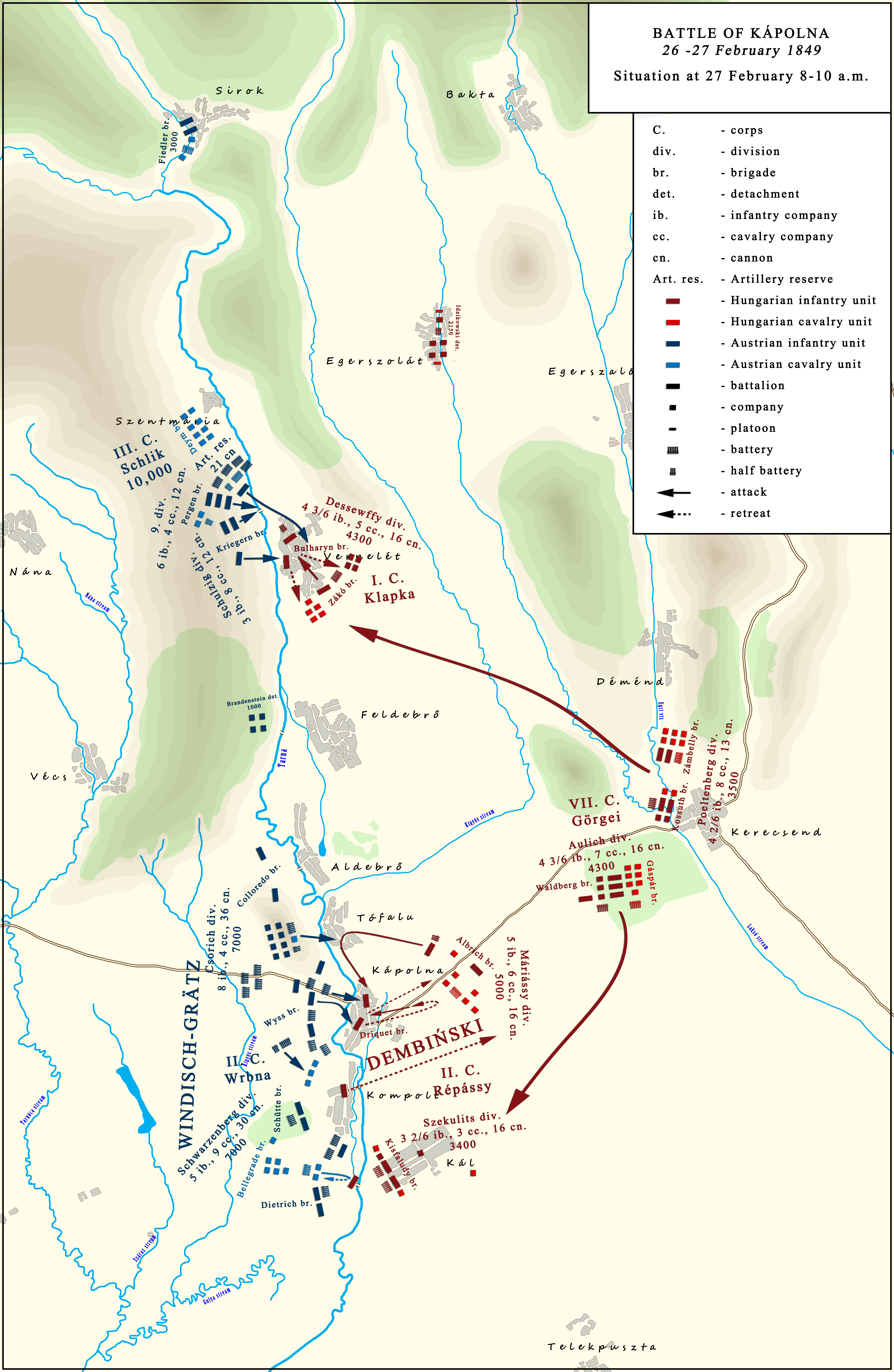
Battle of Kápolna. The situation on 27 February 8–10 am

Windisch-Grätz immediately issued the orders to start the attack, according to which Wyss' brigade, supported by the artillery of Csorich's division and followed by Schütte's brigade, which was the army's reserve, was to attack Kápolna, to the left of this, through Tótfalu, the bulk of the Colloredo brigade had to push forward, and still further north, the 2 battalions belonging to the latter brigade, under Major Augustinec, were to advance through Feldebrő to connect with Schlik; finally, Schwarzenberg had to advance with his column to Kál at the same time as the Wyss Brigade. The latter's brigade was grouped for the ordered attack as follows: the 2. Kaiserjäger battalion occupied the vineyards on both sides of the road; in support of it, the Fürstenwärther battalion was stationed behind the vineyards; to the right of the Kaiserjäger battalion, at the same height, a battalion of one line regiment was positioned, and in the rear, another battalion was deployed as a reserve; while the cavalry of the brigade, with the artillery, was stationing, under Colonel Montenuovo, opposite the manor of Kompolt. While the brigade was thus deployed for battle, 3 batteries were positioned along the highway and unleashed cannonade against Kápolna and the Hungarian infantry and artillery positioned along its western perimeter.

At 7 a.m. the guns of the opposing sides started firing almost simultaneously - now not only in the Kápolna area, but also north of Verpelét.

When Dembiński sensed at dawn that Schlik was threatening the right flank and rear of Klapka's troops by taking the Sirok Pass, he ordered the general to retake the Sirok Pass and sent Poeltenberg's division to his assistance. He also sent order to Görgei to take command at Verpelét and prevent the two enemy corps from joining forces (but this order did not reached to Görgei, because he was trying to bring Guyon's division on the battlefield). Klapka then had only Colonel Dessewffy's division at his disposal to attempt an attack against Schlik's entire corps. Klapka negligently failed to occupy Várhegy (Castle Mountain) on the right bank of the Tarna, between Tarnaszentmária and Verpelét, from where he could have a magnificent view of the settlement. The Austrians, however, were not hesitant to take the high ground, and their 33 guns were thus ideally positioned to support the advancing infantry. After an hour and a half of artillery duels, Schlik felt the time had come to storm Verpelét. The Kriegern Brigade, crossing on the left bank of the Tarna, with two battalions advanced in the first line of battle and with one in reserve, moved in the valley against the northern edge of the town, while the Pergen Brigade was a little later directed along the road on the right bank of the Tarna, attacking over the stone bridge the north-western edge of Verpelét. Against them, the 2nd Battalion of the 39th Dom Miguel Infantry Regiment and the 43rd Honvéd Battalion defended the settlement. Despite Kriegern's first battle lines, after a fierce fight, pushed back the Don Miguel and 43. battalions to the southeast half of Verpelét, but after Klapka ordered the 34th battalion in support of the two battalions, the battle briefly turned in the favor of the Hungarians; but Schlik soon sent the third battalion of the Kriegern Brigade and then also units of the Pergen Brigade into action, which after a short but fierce fight, at about 10 o'clock, completely drove the Honvéds out of the village, who retreated to the main body of the division which had taken up position on the Ilka hill. Then, Schlik ordered the cavalry under General Deym to advance to increase the advantage gained until then, the first of which, despite the effective fire of Dessewffy's batteries, was the Prince of Prussia's regiment of cuirassiers, which broke out from Verpelét, with the mission to push further back the Hungarians. Klapka sent 2 companies of the Imperial and 1 company of the Coburg Hussars to stop the attack, soon followed by 2 squadrons of Lehel Hussars from the reserve. Thereupon the cavalry units assembled in front of the front line of the two sides clashed with such heroic and fierce determination that, according to eyewitnesses, the infantry of both sides, watched with lowered rifles the bloody spectacle in silence and motionless. As a result of this fierce confrontation, on both sides, 50-60 wounded and dead hussars and cuirassiers were fallen on the ground. After a long and bloody fight, the hussars were finally forced to retreat in order, followed by the cuirassiers, but after the pursuers were joined also by other enemy cavalry units, which came out from Verpelét, the hussars started to flee. Most aztán az osztrák gyalogság és tüzérség is megkezdi előnyomulását. This time, the triumphant cuirassiers attacked the hussars at the head of the Hungarian column and drove them away. Their next target was the unprotected infantry battery protected by the hussars, whose personnel were slaughtered. Poeltenberg's division sent by Dembiński did not arrive at Verpelét to help Klapka until after 10 a.m. when the town was already in Schlik's possession. But despite Poeltenberg's arrival, Schlik's troops were still in numerical superiority. Seeing the serious situation and the artillerymen's massacre, the enraged Poeltenberg sent four companies of Alexander Hussars to attack. In the renewed cavalry battle, the Hungarian riders were victorious, and the cuirassiers, who had simultaneously been hit from the flank by the bullets of the 14th Battalion, fled back to Verpelét. After this, Klapka tried to retake Verpelét, but, excepting the temporary capture of a couple of houses, without success, despite the fact that the hero of many later battles (ex. Tápióbicske, First Battle of Vác), Major Károly Földváry, led the attack of the 14th Battalion.

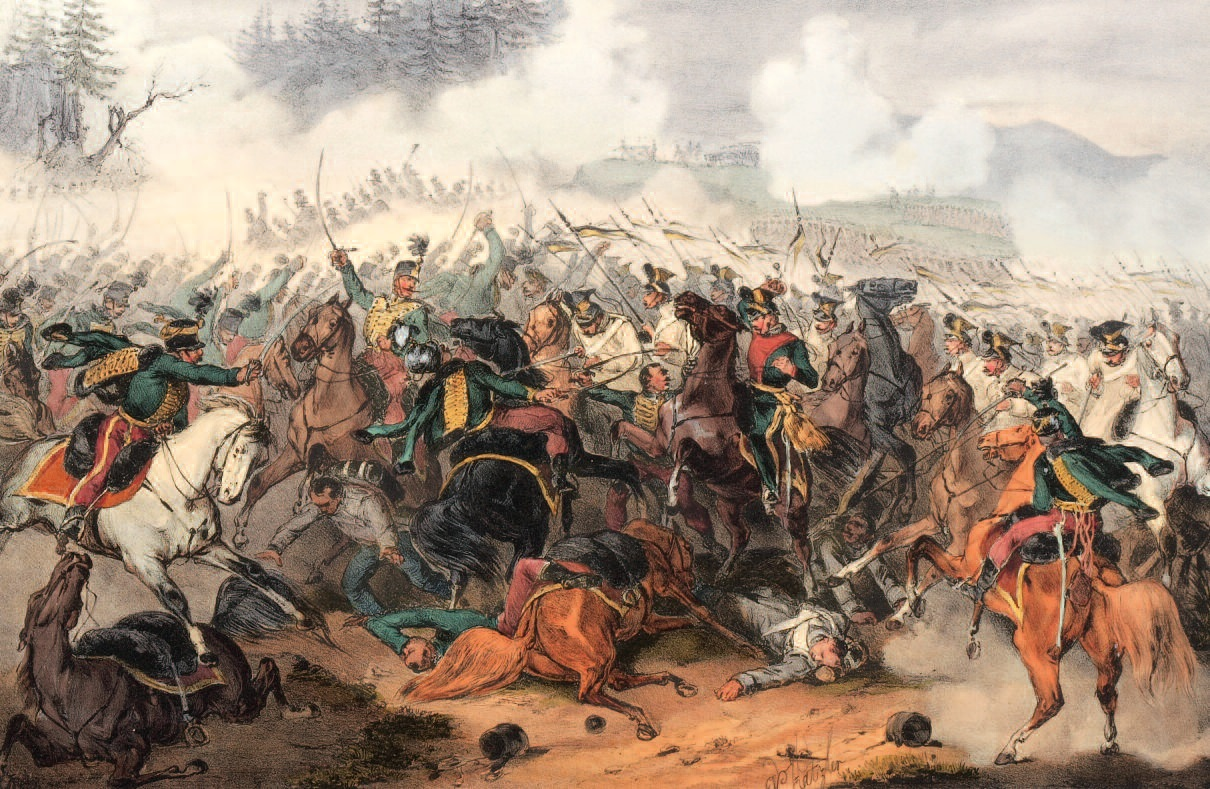
Cavalry battle at Kápolna. (J. Höfelich Armee Bulletin XXVI)

After informing Guyon about the start of the battle, and ordering him to rush on the battlefield, Görgei arrived in Kál only after 9 p.m. and ordered two battalions to defend the Kál bridgehead and Kompolt. Then Görgei went to Dembiński to receive new orders, arriving there at 11 o'clock and reported that Guyon's division arrived at Kerecsend. Why aren't you in your place? was blasted at him by Dembiński, pointing towards Verpelét. - The right flank has already retreated because you are not in your place. I have nothing to do with the right wing, because [according to your order] I command the left. - replied Görgei, who, as presented above, had to bring the Hungarian units which were far away from the battlefield, and, of course, as a result of this, was unaware of Dembiński's new orders and the state of the battle. But I have sent you orders to command the right flank, and you are to gallop there at once, said the irritated Dembiński, and Görgei, understanding that this was no time for discussion because the fate of the army was at stake, immediately obeyed the order, silently bowing his head.

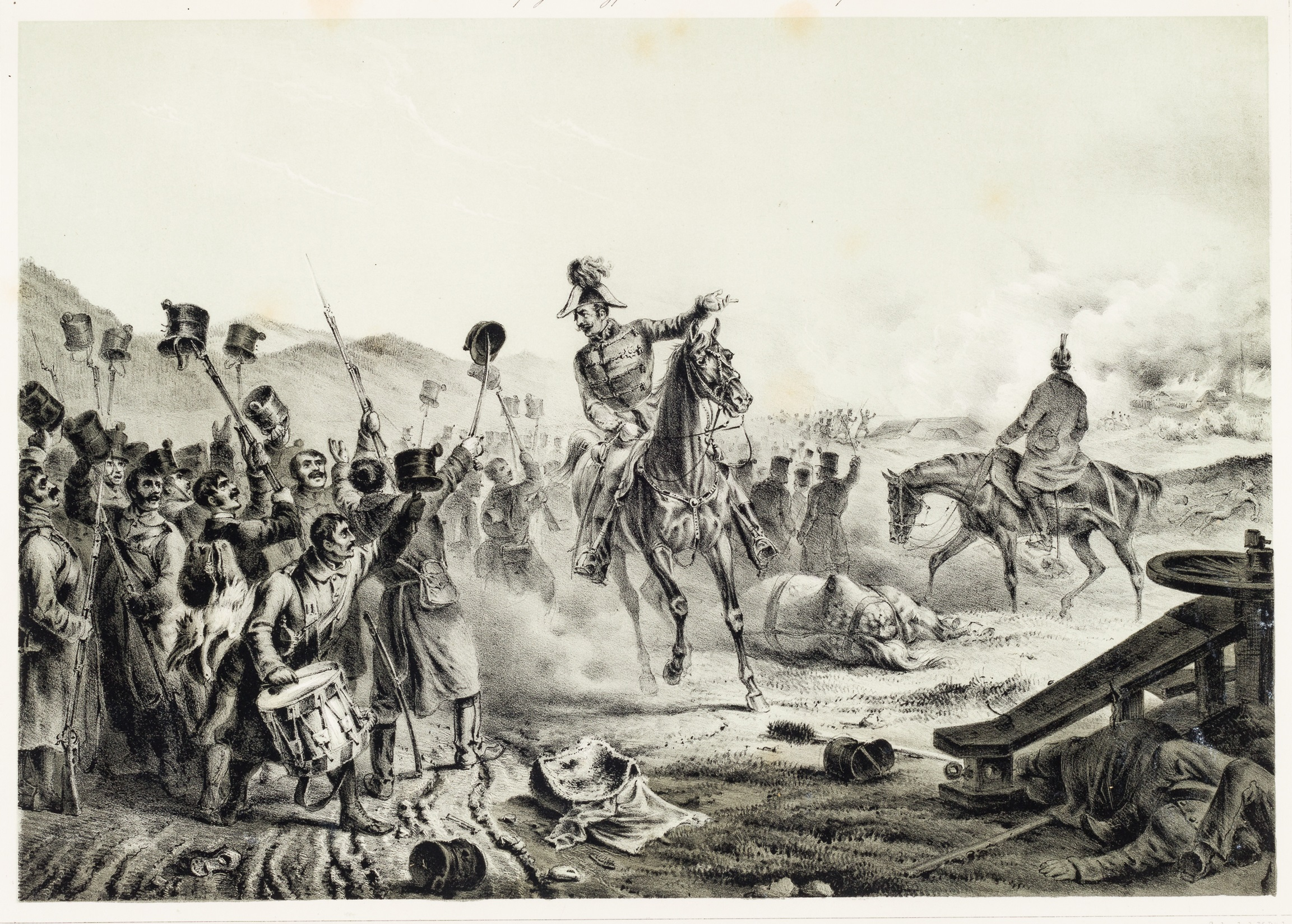
Schlik's troops attack Verpelét by Bachmann Hohmann

Görgei arrived at the outskirts of Verpelét at noon and quickly assessed the situation. Seeing the futile attempts of his troops and the fierce counterattacks of the Imperials, he ordered a retreat to take up defensible positions on the Kerecsend hills, south-east from Verpelét. Görgei knew that he would need additional reinforcements if he was to stop Schlik, so he ordered Klapka to search out the detachment led by Major Sulcz Bódog. Colonel Jerzy Bułharyn with the remnants of the Dessewffy Division occupied Ilka hill, south-east of Verpelét, where the column which was protecting the headquarters of the VII Corps, which consisted of 2 companies of grenadiers, a small squadron of the German Legion, the remnants of the 3rd Battalion of the 40th Regiment (which survived, after the battalion was crushed in the Battle of Nagyszombat), a battery of Congreve rockets and 1 battery of cannons, were ordered to move from Kerecsend, while Poeltenberg was ordered to take up a position on the hills east of Feldebrő. The advancing imperial troops arrived at the foot of the plateau around 1 pm. To do this, Lieutenant General Schlik grouped his corps as follows: Lieutenant-General Schulzig, having re-established communication with Major Augustinec's column, was to operate from the direction of Verpelét, with the Kriegern and Deym Brigades, against the heights occupied by Poeltenberg and Bulharyn; Staff Major Gablenz with 4 companies of infantry, 1 company of cavalry and 1/2 battery had to attack the Hungarian right flank from the direction of the vineyards northeast of Verpelét, and finally, Schlik himself with the Pergen brigade as the first and the Fiedler brigade as the second line of attack, together with all the cavalry of the corps, advanced on the hills, leaning towards the southeast, between the Rosnak and Bilincsi streams against Görgei's right flank, at the same time extending his attention towards Eger, from which direction the advanced Polish legionaries of the Schulcz brigade had already started to push forward. The Deym and Kriegern brigades, leading the attackers, charged Poeltenberg's soldiers. Schulzig's task was to deploy most of his artillery at first, and after a preliminary fire, one of the battalions of the Parma regiment charged, but Poeltenberg soon repulsed it. The Dessewffy division of Klapka's corps and Poeltenberg's division held off Schlik's corps on the heights east of Verpelét for 2–3 hours in the afternoon. Schulzig then ordered forward the Latour and Hartmann battalions together with the Otočac border guard battalion, supported by Augustinec's column, which attacked from Feldebrő; as a result of this attack of overwhelming forces, Poeltenberg had to retreat, being forced to do that also by the situation of the divisions fighting to his right.

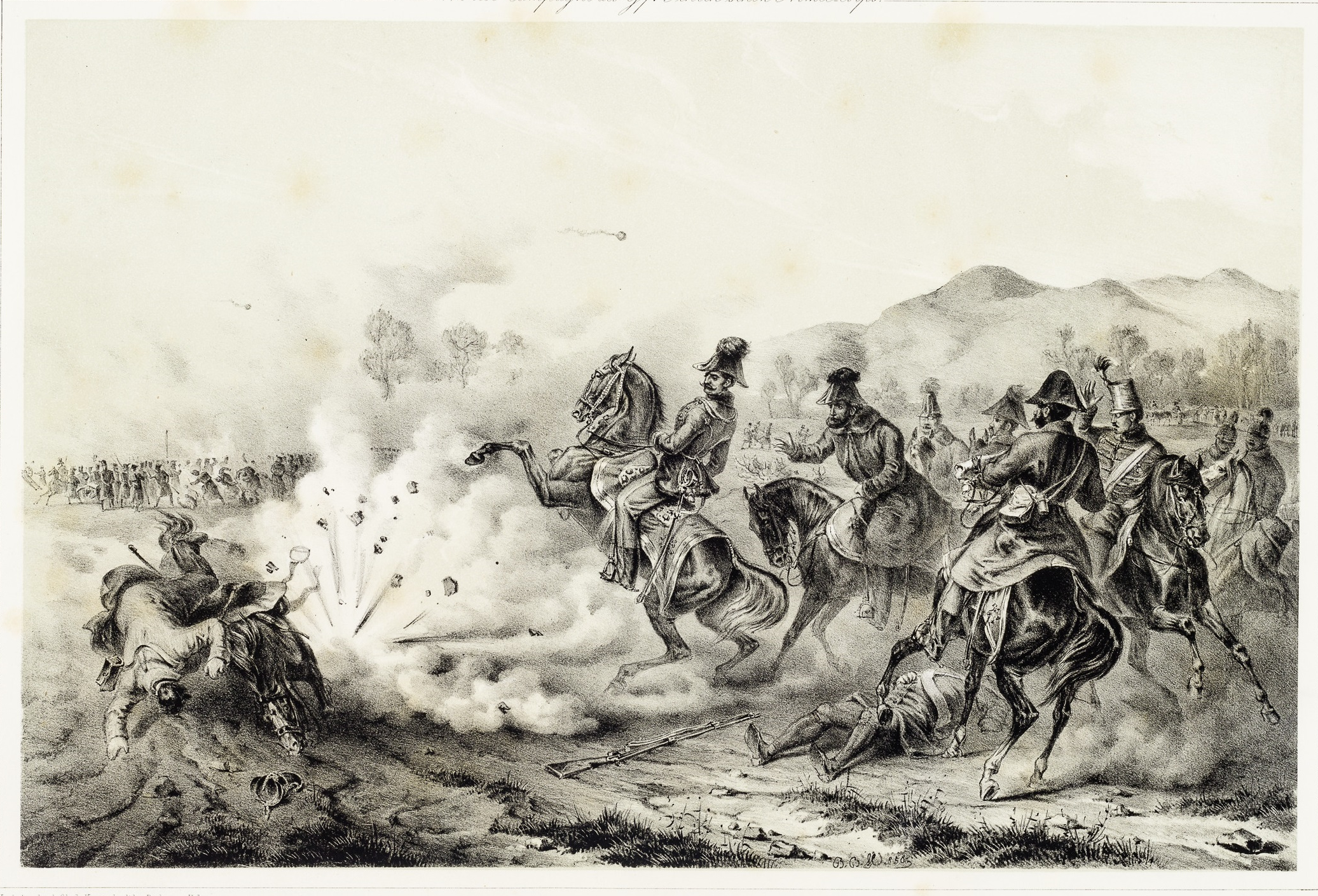
Schlik leading the attack on Verpelét by Bachmann Hohmann

On the right flank, however, there were problems with Dessewffy's tired soldiers. Görgei reinforced the demoralized unit with the detachment led by Colonel Weissl from his own reserve. The cavalry was the first to attack from Schlik's attackıng troops, but the well-aimed shots from Görgei's right flank's batteries forced it to retreat before the charge could begin. In response, Dessewffy attempted a counterattack with the 34th and 43rd Honvéd battalions against Gablenz and the right wing units of the Pergen Brigade. This, as well as an offensive thrust, almost simultaneously applied by Görgei's flank, was temporarily crowned with success, but after Schlik's first line of battle had been increasingly reinforced, Dessewffy, as well as Görgei's extreme right flank, formed by the column of his own corps' headquarters, was forced to retreat, which retreat, especially on the right flank, almost became a rout. Schlik's plan to try to push Görgei down the hill to the east and cut him off from the center was starting to pay out. Görgei tried several times to assault the Austrian batteries, but without success. The battle was approaching a critical moment, but at about 3 pm Klapka arrived from Egerszalók with Sulcz's brigade, just emerging on the high ground on Schlik's left, from which, first of all, he fired a heavy cannonade, and then deployed to attack the 52nd battalion, two companies of the 42nd Battalion and the Polish Legion. However, this was not enough to overcome Schlik's superior strength, and as a result, the Hungarian right flank started to retreat around 2-3 pm. Sulcz did not attempt the decisive attack, but with his artillery and several smaller infantry attacks, he succeeded in stopping Schlik's advance, preventing him to obstruct the retreat of Görgei's army towards Kerecsend. Another reason for the retreat towards Kerecsend was that Görgei and Klapka did not want to risk being cut off by the enemy troops advancing through Kápolna, Kál, and Tófalu. Then a duel between Klapka's and Schlik's artilleries continued until the evening, after which Schulz's division withdrew to Eger.

In the meantime, Poeltenberg on the left flank did his job brilliantly, and between 4-5 p.m. he reached a position between Kápolna and Kerecsend, where the whole retreating Hungarian army was concentrated.

General Dembinski in the Battle of Kapolna

In the center, at Kápolna, Dembiński personally commanded the Hungarian troops, consisting in fact only of the Máriássy division. At Kápolna, Dembiński, as we have seen above, withdrew the Máriássy division to the lower eastern bank of the Tarna, and placed the rest of his troops on the hills above the village. To reinforce the defenses, he made only preparations to block the bridge of the village but did not make any preparation to blow it up, if needed. He left the defense of the village only to the Driquet brigade of Máriássy's division because he had ordered the Albrich brigade in the vicinity of Verpelét. Máriássy warned Dembiński that it would be difficult to defend Kápolna since the right bank of the Tarna was higher than the left bank, but Dembiński did not listen to the warning. After sunrise, after the 3 Austrian batteries along the highway and its western edge, forced the Hungarian guns to retreat, causing losses also to the infantry, Wyss, with his two first-line battalions, pushed across the bridge with lightning speed and took possession of the western part of Kápolna. The quick success of the attack surprised even Windisch-Grätz. Wyss now, in order to make the most of his first successes, rushed for the cavalry and artillery waiting on the right bank of the Tarna, under the leadership of Colonel Montenuovo, but by the time he returned to the village the situation there had changed radically.

Dembiński, having already noticed the advance of the Colloredo brigade towards Tótfalu, he went with 5 companies of the Imperial Hussars, the Zanini battalion, and 10 guns, towards Tótfalu, where, in front of the village, he deployed his batteries, facing the Colloredo brigade. This was the time of Wyss's attack on Kápolna, which prompted Dembiński at about 10 a.m., to attempt retaking this village with the Zanini and the 47th battalions which he initially led against Tótfalu, supported also by his batteries installed in an advantageous position. This attempt had good chances of success because at the same time, Aulich attacked Schwarzenberg from the Austrian right flank, and, following an order from Dembiński, deployed part of his division towards Kompolt, thus in the immediate vicinity of Kápolna.

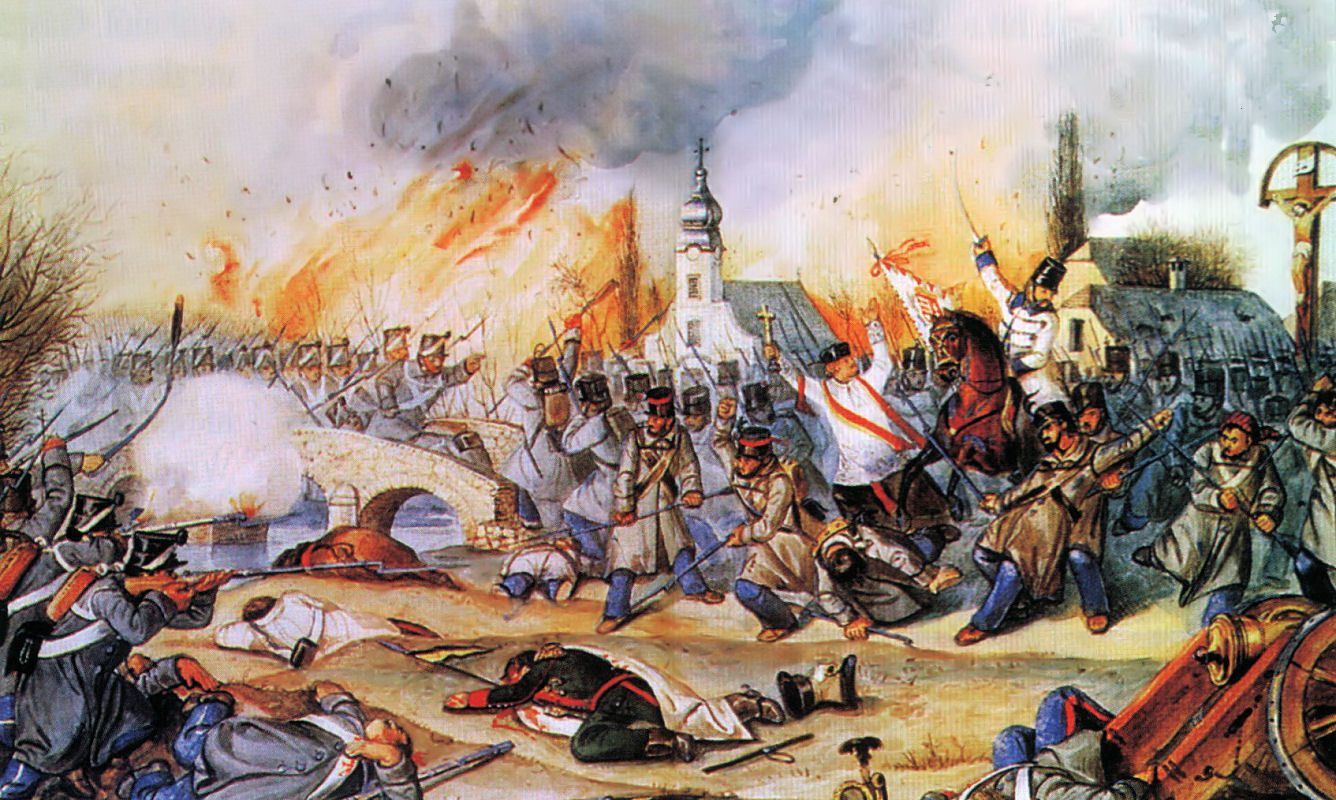
Than_Mor_Kapolnai_csata

Dembiński, therefore, sent the infantry of the Driquet Brigade on the attack. From the north, a battalion of the 16th Zanini Infantry Regiment, and along the highway the 44th and 47th Home Army Battalions advanced. The Zaninis, led by Major Móric Psotta and Major Ferdinand Molnár and chaplain Cézár Mednyánszky, dressed in his priestly attire and carrying a crucifix, despite the enemy's canister fire, advanced as far as the stone bridge over the Tarna. There was a desperate struggle for possession of each building. Máriássy personally led the attack of the 44th and 47th Honvéd battalions against the tavern on the eastern edge of the village, which was occupied by the K.u.K. troops. and managed to occupy some houses and the tavern building which was then secured by the 44th Battalion. The battle was finally decided by the arrival of the Austrian reserves brought by General Wyss which forced the Honvéds to retreat. The Italian soldiers of the Zanini battalion who were fighting around the church in the northern part of the village became trapped: in the heavy fighting, they were surrounded by soldiers of the 23rd Schönhals Infantry Regiment. The Zanini battalion, caught between two fires, found itself in a hopeless situation, with only a few of its men making it back to their Hungarian positions in a stampede, while their commander and most of the battalion eventually surrendered. Dembiński subsequently described the Italians' deed as cowardly, claiming that they had laid down their weapons without firing a shot. However, even Austrian sources refuted this. The attack of the Zanini battalion and their subsequent flight is described in the memory of the camp chaplain Cézár Mednyánszky, who led them: I got off the horse, said a few words to the soldiers, and then we started to advance. We were greeted by cartridge fire, but the Italians were braver than I thought. They broke into the village (and put up our flag [on a building]). But as soon as the Imperials came against us, they were frightened and scattered. I followed the example of Commander (Psotta) and I also ran to the place from which I had started. No sooner had I started to run, than an Imperial soldier rushed towards me and grabbed my left arm. I knew that as an Austrian prisoner, I would find no mercy. I struck him on the head with my massive silver cross and broke free. I ran to the gate of one of the houses and [this is how I] escaped. Bullets whistled all around me, but I reached our troops unharmed. Only my clerical robe was torn and my cross slightly bent.

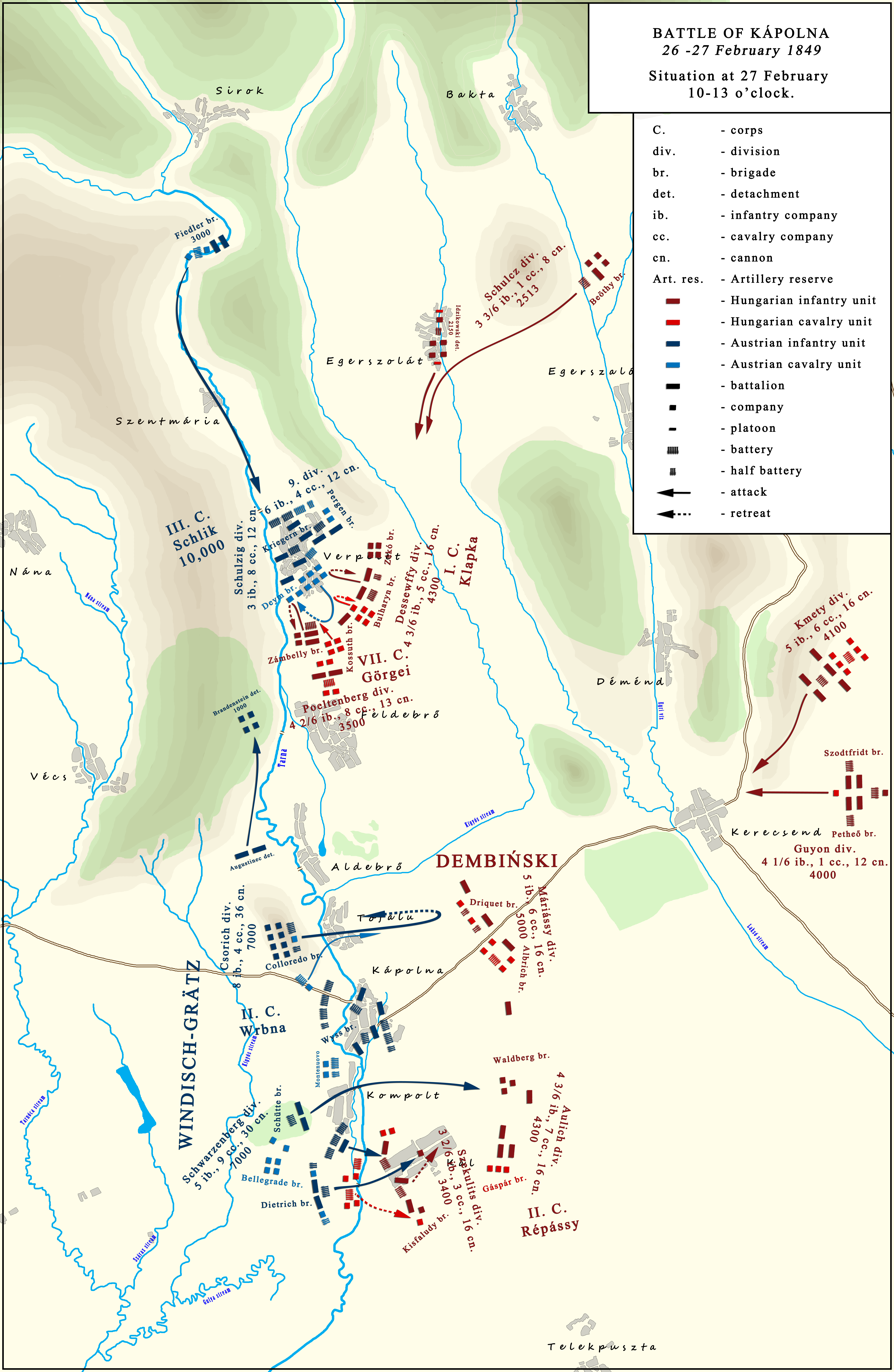
Battle of Kápolna. The situation on 27 February 10–13 o'clock

After the disarming of the Zanini battalion, however, the whole of the Wyss Brigade swarmed on the 44th and 47th battalions and drove the honvéds out of the tavern. Máriássy's battalions were driven out of the village, being pushed east of it, to the road to Kerecsend, where they joined the rest of his division, together with the batteries that had escaped the danger, retreated opposite to the Bishop's manor. Máriássy made one more attempt to retake Kápolna but was then forced to retreat towards Kerecsend. After occupying Kápolna, the Wyss Brigade attempted to break out of the village at about 10 o'clock, but this feeble attempt was repulsed by the Hungarian artillery. Windisch-Grätz however, was concerned about Schlik, with whom he was still unable to make contact (although he had already heard the fierce battle noise from the north). For the rest of the battle, he ordered the Colloredo Brigade northwards to occupy the village of Tófalu, This was done in order to relieve the pressure on Wyss and give him an opportunity to break out of the village, and force the Hungarians to retreat from the center, due to Colloredo's bypassing them from the north. However, Colloredo's attack collapsed under fire from a single 12-pound Hungarian battery.

After the unsuccessful counterattack, Dembiński ordered back his division which protected Kompolt and assured his contact with the Szekulits division. The rapid loss of Kápolna increased his concerns that Windisch-Grätz could push further forward and split the Hungarian frontline in the centre. In addition, with the imperial forces on the right wing crossing at Tófalu and threatening to encircle Máriássy, at 1 pm Dembiński ordered the center and left wing of his army to retreat.

On the Hungarian left wing, during the night Dembiński withdrew the Hungarian troops stationed at Kál to the east bank of the Tarna. He gave the command to Colonel Lajos Aulich, whose task was twofold. On the one hand, he had to pin down as many enemy forces as possible, and on the other hand, he had to make sure that the opposing enemy did not break through and reach the road to Poroszló before the Hungarian army did.

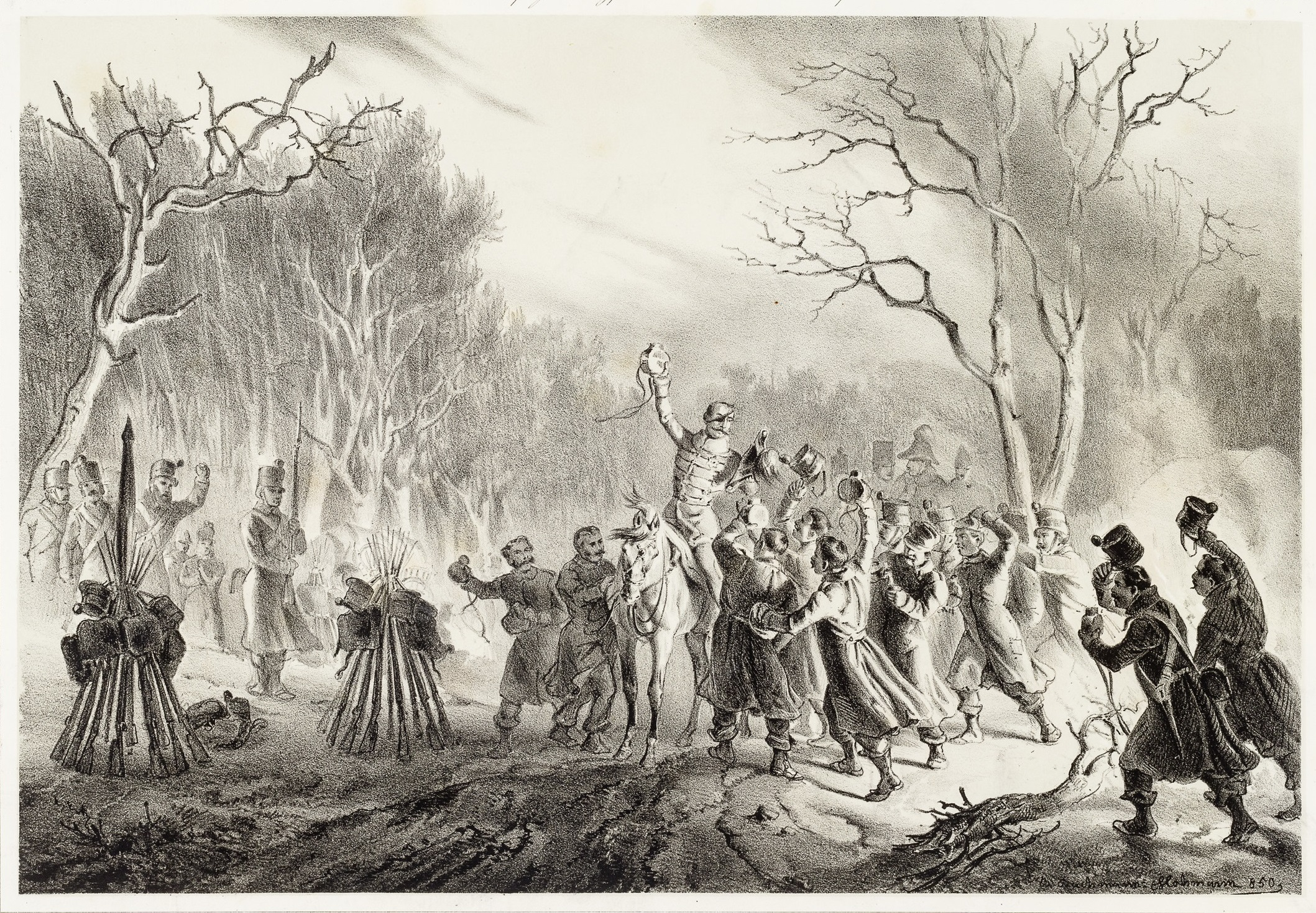
Schlik and his soldiers celebrating the victory. Bachmann Hochmann

Aulich's division arrived in the village around 9 o'clock. When Aulich saw Máriássy's division retreating, he also abandoned his offensive movements and withdrew his troops to Kál. His cavalry took over the guarding of the bridgehead from the 56th Honvéd Battalion, which later proved to be a major tactical error. The rest of his troops were directed northwards by Dembiński to recapture Kápolna. The imperial command first sent the Dietrich Brigade to capture the village around 11:30. Schwarzenberg, in the beginning, limited himself to an artillery duel, excepting the 1 squadron of cuirassiers and 1 battery under Lieutenant-Colonel Minutillo, sent against the left flank of the Hungarians. Only when the Honvéds began to retreat, he ordered his infantry forward toward Kál and Kompolt. However, by the time the Schütte Brigade, consisting of two battalions, broke out of the Kompolt forest to attack the village with the same name, when they arrived there at noon, the Hungarians had already left the village The brigade occupied the evacuated Kompolt and charged against the Tarna bridge. After a short battle, the Hussars who were guarding the bridge abandoned the bridgehead and, together with Szekulits's troops, retreated to the southern and eastern edges of Kál. (Note: According to historian Róbert Hermann, Aulich's troops repulsed all enemy attacks on 27 February.)

However, at the same time as the Austrians were breaking in Kál, the Hungarians from the center were preparing to retake Kápolna, and Aulich, who tried his best to defend Kál, received orders from Dembiński to march north with his troops to support this attack. Aulich set off towards Kápolna, but on the way he was informed that the K.u.K. troops had in the meantime pushed the Kisfaludy Brigade, which he left to defend Kál, out of the village. Driven by this concern, he returned with his troops towards Kál, but before he could reach it, Dembiński ordered him to begin his retreat. Therefore, Aulich's infantry was no longer sent to retake the village but immediately began to retreat. The soldiers of the Kisfaludy Brigade, who did not retreated yet from Kál, were trapped in the village, and cut off from their own units by the imperial artillery and cavalry. These soldiers formed an infantry square, and moved out of the village under the enemy's heavy attacks, escaping this trap with relatively few casualties.

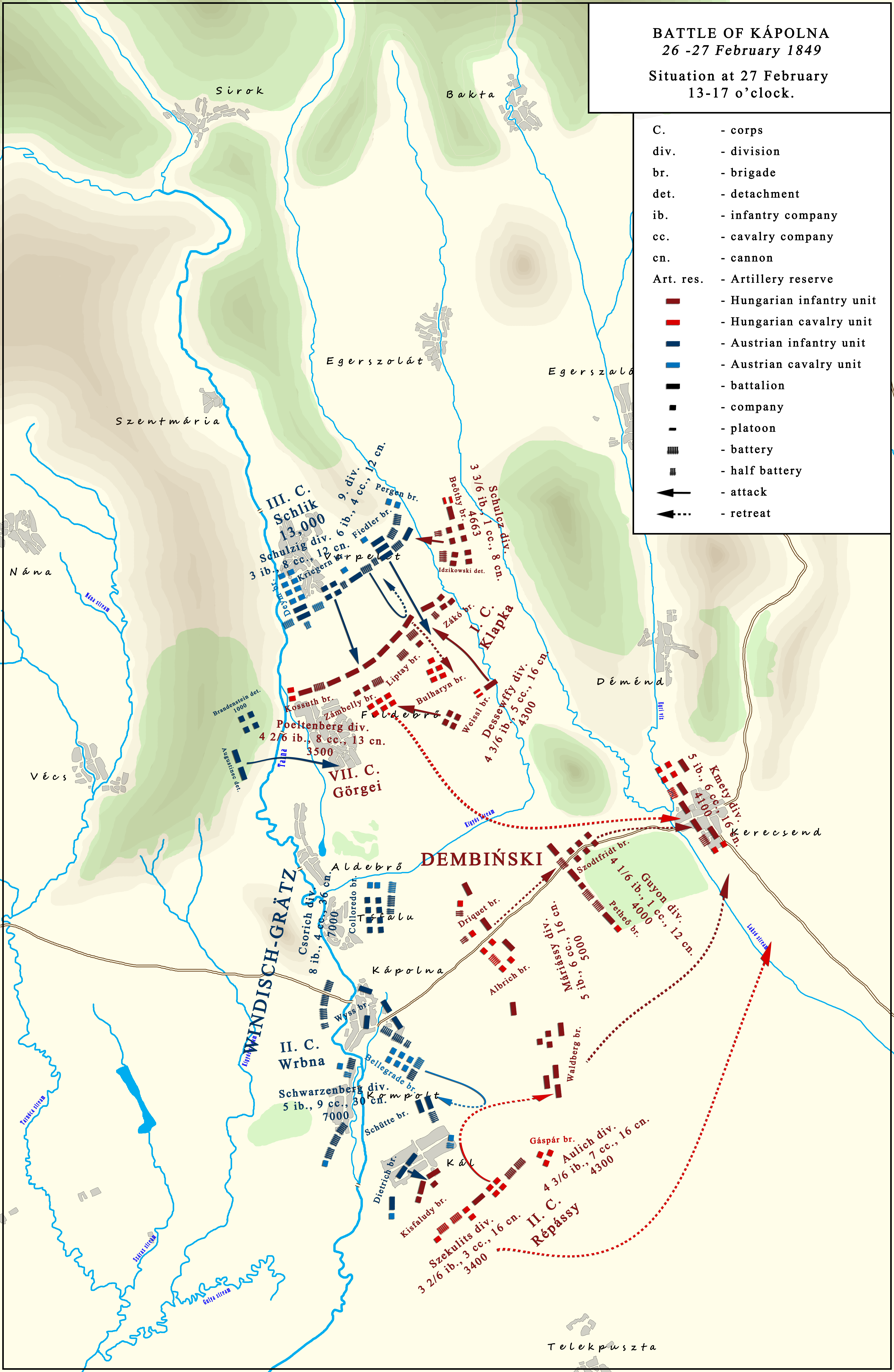
Battle of Kápolna. The situation on 27 February 13–17 pm

Dembiński, having been informed at half past one in the afternoon of the arrival of Guyon's division at Kerecsend, immediately sent orders to its commander to advance to the hill between Kerecsend and Kápolna and there to take up a defensive position to ensure the safe retreat of the troops. Dembiński did not intend to continue the battle, but ordered a retreat at about 4 pm, although the Hungarian troops, after the arrival of Guyon's and then Kmety's divisions, were already significantly outnumbering the Austrian troops present on the battlefield. During the day and a half of fighting, the Austrian troops were so exhausted that they camped and started to cook immediately after the battle, a clear sign of their total exhaustion and demoralization. Also according to Windisch-Grätz's personal opinion, his army was incapable of pursuing the enemy.

By the time Guyon reached his appointed position, it was about 2 o'clock, and Colloredo's column, having broken out of Tótfalu, threatened Máriássy's division on the right, which immediately began to retreat and took up a position on Guyon's left, while Poeltenberg was ordered to take up a position on the right, which he did not do, but retreated to Kerecsend without any stops. At the same time, Aulich received orders to retreat with the left wing of the army towards Tiszafüred on the Poroszló road, stopping for a while at Füzesabony. As soon as the Dietrich brigade noticed Szekulits's retreat, being joined also by the two battalions sent to Kompolt, immediately advanced to Kál, where it had a short and insignificant fight with Szekulits's rearguard. At the same time as the infantry, Schwarzenberg ordered the 3 uhlan companies under Lieutenant-Colonel Count Nostic against the Hussars south of Kápolna, but seeing that their infantry settled at Kál, the cavalry also gave up the pursuit.

Guyon, after Máriássy's division, which was next to him, had soon continued its retreat, held his position for a while, briskly responding to Colloredo's cannonade, and then, after he had learned that Máriássy had gained enough ground behind him, he himself moved away his troops and joined, on the heights east of Kerecsend, Görgei's right flank and Kmety's division, which had arrived there a short time before.

The Austrians did not think much of vigorous pursuit. Colloredo pursued the retreating Máriássy for a while, but Guyon soon put his battalions between the two, stopping to the pursuit. Wyss's brigade had been so exhausted in the course of the preceding fightings that remained at Kápolna even after Máriássy's retreat; Schwarzenberg's column seemed to be competing with Aulich in inactivity. But the Schütte brigade of 10 grenadier companies and the 6 companies of cavalry of the Wyss brigade, led by Montenuovo, which remained west of Kápolna, could have been still used to pursue the retreating Hungarians. The cavalry, together with 2 batteries, was indeed ordered by Windisch-Grätz to pursue. Montenuovo wanted to cross the Tarna in a straight line but was hindered by the swampy ground and several ditches, thus being forced to use the bridge at Kápolna to cross; meanwhile the Hungarians gained a considerable distance from them. From Kápolna Montenuovo, instead of advancing towards Kerecsend, turned to the south-east, and as he advanced, he came upon Aulich's rearguard, which had been previously already pressed by Schwarzenberg, near Füzesabony, and against which he immediately deployed his batteries; but as Abony could not be attacked without an infantry, he ceased further pursuit before that town.

== Aftermath ==
The Austrian troops spent the night in the positions they had taken at the end of the battle; the Zeisberg column, which had followed the army on the right, did not take part in the second day's fighting either but advanced from Méra via Tarnabod to Erdőtelek. Of the Hungarian army, under the cover of Kmety's division camped on the hills of Kerecsend, Schultz's division camped at Eger, Dessewffy, Poeltenberg, and Guyon's divisions at Kerecsend, and finally, Aulich and Szekulits' divisions camped at Szihalom and Füzesabony.

So the Hungarian army successfully retreated towards Poroszló in several columns.

The battlefield fell into the hands of Windisch-Grätz, and it was then that he issued his famous report: I found the rebel hordes at Kápolna in terrible numbers, but I scattered them and destroyed most of them. The rest fled across the Tisza. I hope to be in Debrecen in a few days, and to capture the nest of the rebellion. But the imperial commander-in-chief made a great mistake. He did not win a decisive victory, he did not disperse the honvéd army and he did not succeed in breaking its morale either.

He could see this for himself the day after the battle. On 28 February, the Hungarian army concentrated at Mezőkövesd was pursued by the cavalry brigade of Major General Franz Deym of the Schlik Corps. Deym's seven companies of cuirassiers ambushed the cavalry of the rearguard Kmety division, and his artillery unleashed a devastating cannonade on the Hungarians. Colonel András Gáspár received an order, probably from Aulich, to help Kmety's troops with the 9th Hussars. For the first time in his life, the Colonel was able to lead the entire regiment, the unit he had served in for 28 years, in a charge against his own regimental commander. As soon as Gáspár and the regiment reached the same line as the Hungarian position, with two squadrons of hussars, he attacked from the flank, the enemy battery which was continuously firing on the Hungarian center and left wing. Major Kornél Görgei volunteered for the assault and received permission from Gáspar to attack the cannons, which was carried out immediately by the Hussars. A company of the 13th (Hunyadi) Hussar Regiment joined the cavalry battle, while Kmety's companies of the 10th (William) Hussar Regiment also participated in the fight. The Hussars immediately captured two guns (three according to another source), two ammunition wagons, 29 prisoners (including an officer) and 20 horses. The cuirassiers fled in desperation as far as the Szihalom heights, where they were picked up by the Montenuovo cavalry brigade. Encouraged by this victory, the Hungarian army began to advance again against the troops of Windisch-Grätz, but the overly cautious Dembiński stopped it and ordered his soldiers back to Tiszafüred, behind the Tisza.

On 1 March, Dembiński ordered another retreat. On that day Klapka's corps fought a lost rearguard action with the enemy at Egerfarmos, and on 3 March the whole army was concentrated at Poroszló and Tiszafüred.

Ironically, and as part of the chronicle of this important two-day battle, the raid on Szolnok, originally planned as a diversion before the battle, took place eventually after the battle of Kápolna. The stunning Hungarian victory at Szolnok ultimately proved tactically unnecessary, as the clash planned as the decisive battle which had to follow it, had been fought earlier and it was lost.

=== The revolt from Tiszafüred, and its consequences ===
There is no doubt that Dembiński's personality has also contributed to much criticism of his activities: on several occasions, he has shifted responsibility to his subordinates and his defensive leading methods have led to clashes with his staff.

During the retreat, Dembiński once again proved his incompetence as a commander. The movement against the commander-in-chief had broken out in Klapka's corps, and the senior officers declared that they would only follow Dembiński's orders if they were countersigned by Klapka, Görgei or General Mihály Répásy. The unusual demand in terms of military subordination was explained by the unpleasant experiences during the month in which Dembiński was the commander-in-chief. However, during this revolt, the senior officers respected the political norms typical of civilian states. At Görgei's suggestion, Government commissioner Bertalan Szemere, a powerful representative of the political power, was invited to the officers' meeting in Tiszafüred from 3 March and asked to mediate between them and Henryk Dembiński. Szemere, accompanied by the corps commanders, went to Dembiński and tried to persuade him to hold a council of war. Dembiński refused to do so, and Szemere relieved him of his command and temporarily entrusted it to Görgei.

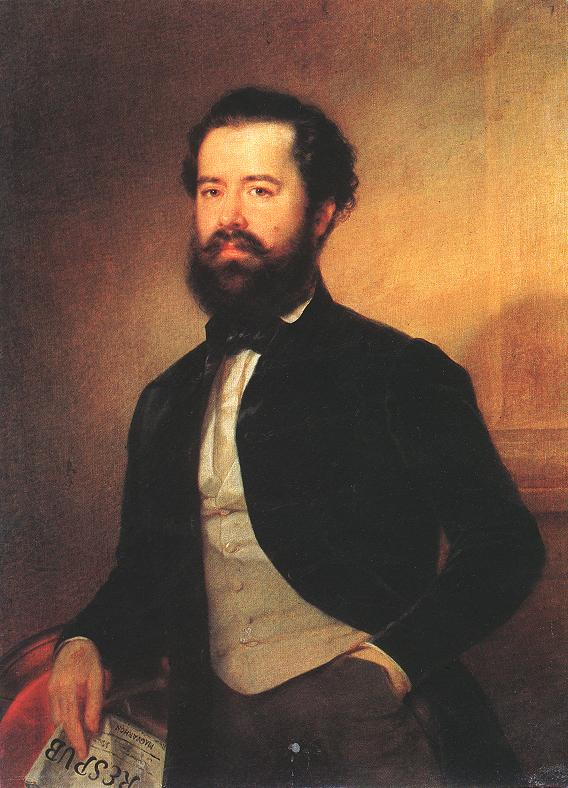
Prime Minister Bertalan Szemere

Having heard about the events in Tiszafüred, Kossuth went to the camp with the intention of shooting Görgei in the head, whom he considered the instigator of the officers's revolt, and Dembiński's replacement. He took the Minister of War, Lázár Mészáros, and Major General Antal Vetter, the head of the Ministry's General Staff Department, with him to the camp. Vetter's trip to the camp was also recommended by Szemere, who said he was "an authority". Kossuth understood the hint, and before leaving for the camp he offered Vetter the high commandment. Vetter expressed his willingness, in case Kossuth could find no other worthy candidate, but stipulated that his appointment could only be made after the Tiszafüred inquiry had been completed.

According to Vetter's recollection, his candidacy was agreed to by Minister of Defence Lázár Mészáros, who had already relieved him of his previous post, in order to be named immediately after the inquiry the new commander-in-chief. Reports on the rest vary widely. According to Vetter, they met Szemere in the Hortobágy on the way to Tiszafüred, and when Mészáros heard that his favorite, Dembiński, had been imprisoned by Görgei, he declared that the latter should be court-martialed. Vetter added that it would be advisable to do this immediately and send Görgei to Debrecen in custody. Kossuth reportedly declared: Görgei deserved the death sentence because he was a traitor.

After Kossuth's arrival he held a regular inquiry and seeing the mood of the officers of disapproval of Dembiński and their unconditioned support for Görgei, he temporarily approved Szemere's decision. At that moment, the main army then consisted of two groupings: the VII Corps led by Görgei and the II Corps led by Mihály Répásy were stationed near Tiszafüred, while Klapka's I Corps, János Damjanich's 8th Division and Károly Vécsey's 6th Division were stationed near Szolnok. Minister of Defence Lázár Mészáros also believed that the post of commander-in-chief could only be filled once Kossuth had reported to the House of Representatives on the events in Tiszafüred and announced the nomination of a new commander-in-chief. In Debrecen, after long discussions, Vetter on 8 March, finally Vetter was named commander-in-chief. Görgei's greatest enemy, Kossuth's influence in this decision cannot be denied.

=== Losses and consequences beyond military matters for both sides ===
The Battle of Kápolna was the first time since Schwechat that the main forces of the two sides had faced each other. Both commanders-in-chief had planned the battle - but neither had scheduled it for 26–27 February. Of the two generals, Windisch-Grätz reacted faster and better, which had something to do with the fact that he had a staff and Dembiński did not; Windisch-Grätz trusted his subordinates and Dembiński did not. Knowing the opposing forces, the outcome of the battle was not a foregone conclusion. Since Dembiński had knowledge of the enemy's approach, it is incomprehensible why he issued his orders for the advance of the VII Corps' rear divisions only on the evening of the 26th.<ref">Hermann 2004, pp. 180–181.</ref>

It should be added that the sub-commanders of the Hungarian army were not always on top of the situation. In their defense, most of them were in their first battle and lacked the routine. They did not have the routine of the imperial army.

The Battle of Kápolna is still a divisive issue among historians. In light of the losses, it was clearly an Austrian victory. The Imperial records show 60 dead, 259 wounded, and 32 missing. In contrast, the losses of the Hungarian army are only estimates. Approximately 140 soldiers were killed in the battle, 500-600 wounded and 900-1000 taken prisoner of war. Most of the latter belonged to the Zanini battalion.

Regarding the objectives, Kápolna was not a clear success for the imperials either. For Windisch-Grätz's intention to inflict a decisive defeat on the Hungarian main forces failed. The battle had also exhausted the Imperial troops to such an extent that, despite the occupation of the Tarna line, they had no strength left to pursue, and even suffered a smaller defeat at Mezőkövesd on 28 February. And although Dembiński offered Windisch-Grätz the opportunity to destroy the retreating Hungarian corps one by one, the Austrian commander-in-chief could not take the opportunity. The only result of Windisch-Grätz's campaign was that the Hungarian army was pushed back behind the Tisza, and lost the military initiative that it had not even gained. After Kápolna, however, the initiative slipped out of Windisch-Grätz's hands - never to return.

Windisch-Grätz's above-quoted exaggerated and arrogant report of the defeat of the rebellious hordes, created the delusion in Vienna that the main Hungarian army had been destroyed, scattered everywhere, and was in disorderly flight, whereupon the Imperial March Constitution of 4 March 1849, abolished the Hungarian constitution and rights which had existed since 1222, recognized, until then, by all Habsburg rulers of Hungary. From then on, the war between the Hungarians and the Habsburg Empire was a life-and-death affair in which there was no longer any possibility of reconciliation.

=== Kossuth's prayer at Kápolna ===
According to tradition, it was believed that, after the battle, Lajos Kossuth traveled to the site of the battle and said a prayer over the freshly dug graves of hundreds of fallen soldiers. The prayer of Kápolna - which, as it will be seen below, did not happen - is a type of supplication, asking for God's mercy and peace for the deceased. Several versions of the text of the prayer have survived, and many wood and stone prints and paintings have been made depicting Kossuth praying at Kápolna. However, the text was not, and could not have been, pronounced at the funeral of the dead soldiers, if only because it was written later than the burial of the heroes of the Battle of Kápolna. Nor is there any indication in Kossuth's correspondence that he wrote and recited any prayers in memory of the heroes who died on this battlefield. Ignác Helfy (1830–1897) - politician, Member of the Hungarian Parliament, and Kossuth's commissioner in Hungary - gave Kossuth a copy of the oil print with the text of the prayer. Kossuth found it beautiful and atmospheric but denied that he had ever written or said a prayer in memory of the heroes of Kápolna. He could not have said a prayer, as the battle was won by the Austrian army, so the battlefield remained in their hands, they buried the dead, and if Kossuth would have been got there, the Austrians would have immediately captured him, as the head of the "rebellion".

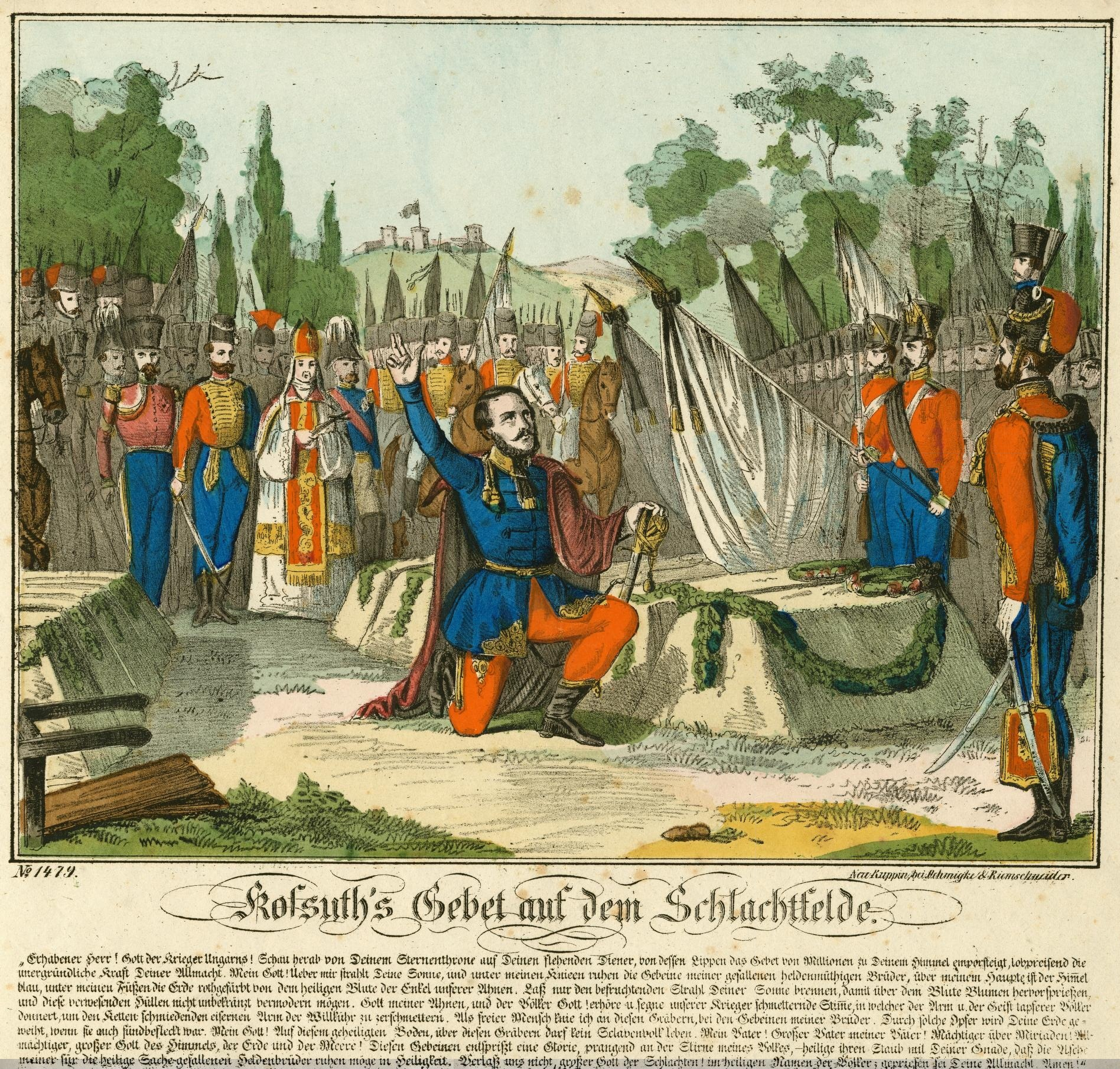
Kossuth's (unhappened) prayer on the battlefield of Kápolna, with the German translation of the prayer below

We now know that the prayer was written by István Roboz (1828–1916), a former student, lawyer, and publicist from Pápa, secretary to Gáspár Noszlopy, the government commissioner of Somogy County in 1848–49, in the mansion of the landowner Pál Csapody in Ádánd, after reading the description of the battle in the journal Kossuth Hírlapja (Kossuth's Journal) on 2 March (at least that is what he claimed). After the prayer was written, it was printed in various places in different versions, for example in Kaposvár, Szombathely, Esztergom, Buda, Pest, Szeged, Kolozsvár, and there are also several unprinted editions. On 1 June 1849 it was published in Komáromi Lapok. There are many textual, grammatical, stylistic, phonetic, and word order differences between the prayer versions printed in different places.

The prayer had already found a considerable echo abroad from the mid-19th century, its text was translated into English, French, Polish, German and Italian, and it was also spread in several versions, in Slovak in poetic form. On 6 August 1849, at a pro-Hungarian meeting in Manchester, one of the speakers quoted the text in English. Since the 1850s several works in English and German on the history of the Hungarian Revolution and War of Independence of 1848-49 and the life of Lajos Kossuth, included the prayer's translations.

Among the English versions, Julian Kune/Kuné Gyula (1831–1914), a former Hungarian Honvéd and a fighter in the American Civil War, quotes an excerpt from the prayer text in his book Reminiscences of an Octogenarian Hungarian Exile, published in Chicago in 1911, entitled Kossuth's Prayer after the Battle of Kápolna. In describing the Battle of Kápolna, the author compares many of its details to the Gettysburg Address which followed the Battle of Gettysburg (1863); showing that Kossuth, like Abraham Lincoln, consecrated the battlefield after the bloodshed with an unforgettable prayer. The popularity of the prayer is indicated by the fact that woodcuts depicting Kossuth praying over the heroes at Kápolna were already being produced abroad in 1849.

Tracing the genesis of the fictitious prayer, its textual variations, its pictorial representations, and its spread over countries, we can conclude that, despite its discreditability, it satisfied a kind of mass demand during the 1848-49 War of Independence and after its defeat.

== Sources ==
- Babucs, Zoltán (2021), "A sorsdöntőnek vélt kápolnai csata ("The Battle of Kápolna, considered decisive")", felvidek.ma 26.02.2021 (in Hungarian)
- Bánlaky, József (2001). A magyar nemzet hadtörténelme (The Military History of the Hungarian Nation) (in Hungarian). Budapest: Arcanum Adatbázis.
- Bóna, Gábor (1987). Tábornokok és törzstisztek a szabadságharcban 1848–49 ("Generals and Staff Officers in the War of Freedom 1848–1849") (in Hungarian). Budapest: Zrínyi Katonai Kiadó. p. 430. ISBN 963-326-343-3.
- Gelich, Richárd (1883). Magyarország függetlenségi harcza 1848-49-ben ("The War of Independence of Hungary in 1848-49, vol. 1) (in Hungarian). Pest: Aigner Lajos.
- "1848-1849 Hadi események (1848-1849 Military Events)". University of Szeged.
- Hermann, Róbert; Bona, Gábor (1996), Az 1848–49. évi szabadságharc története [The history of the Hungarian revolution of 1848] (in Hungarian), Videopont, ISBN 963-8218-20-7
- Hermann, Róbert (2001), 1848–1849 a szabadságharc hadtörténete [The history of the Hungarian revolution of 1848] (in Hungarian), Budapest: Korona, ISBN 963-9376-21-3
- Hermann, Róbert (2004), Az 1848–1849-es szabadságharc nagy csatái ("Great Battles of the Hungarian Revolution of 1848 – 1849") (in Hungarian), Zrínyi, ISBN 963-327-367-6
- Hermann, Róbert (1998), "Kossuth és Görgei (Kossuth and Görgei.)" (PDF), Iskolakultúra. 1998/3
- Hermann, Róbert (2013). Nagy csaták. 15. A magyar önvédelmi háború ("Great Battles. 15. The Hungarian War od Self Defense") (in Hungarian). Budapest: Duna Könyvklub. p. 88. ISBN 978-615-5013-99-7.
- Horváth, Gábor (2016), "Február 26-27. – A kápolnai csata (1849) ("26-27 February - The Battle of Kápolna")", győriszalon.hu 27.02.2016 (in Hungarian)
- Kopka, Ferenc (2014), "A kápolnai csata krónikája – 1. nap ("The Chronicle of the Battle of Kápolna - 1. Day")", Történelmi fegyverek, lőszertöltés, vadászat. kapszli.hu 26.02.2014 (in Hungarian)
- Kopka, Ferenc (2014), "A kápolnai csata krónikája – 2. nap ("The Chronicle of the Battle of Kápolna - 2. Day")", Történelmi fegyverek, lőszertöltés, vadászat. kapszli.hu 27.02.2014 (in Hungarian)
- Nobili, Johann. Hungary 1848: The Winter Campaign. Edited and translated Christopher Pringle. Warwick, UK: Helion & Company Ltd., 2021.
- Rüstow, Friedrich Wilhelm (1866). Az 1848-1849-diki magyar hadjárat története, II. kötet ("The History of the Hungarian Campaign from 1848-1849, vol. 2.) (in Hungarian). Pest: Emich Gusztáv.
- Schmidt-Brentano, Antonio (2007). Die k. k. bzw. k. u. k. Generalität 1816-1918 ("Officers of the K.K and K.u.K. Army") (in German). Budapest: Österreichisches Staatsarchiv. p. 211.
- Vasné Tóth, Kornélia (2019), "Kossuth 1849. évi kápolnai imája. Tévhitek és a valóság ("Kossuth's Prayer at Kápolna from 1849. Misconceptions and Reality")" (PDF), Honismeret 47/1 (in Hungarian)

== See also ==
- Revolutions of 1848 in the Habsburg areas
