= Raid of Kompolt =

Battle during Hungarian Revolution of 1848

Coordinates: 47°44′18.9″N 20°13′53.5″E

Battle of Kompolt
- Part of the Hungarian Revolution of 1848
Date	18 February 1849
Location	Kompolt, Heves County, Kingdom of Hungary
Result	Hungarian victory

Belligerents
Hungarian Revolutionary Army	Austrian Empire

Commanders and leaders
Arisztid Dessewffy	Unknown

Strength
200 + ? hussars.	220 – 240 cuirassiers

Casualties and losses
3 wounded 1 prisoner	2, 8, 50 dead 17 wounded 30–38 prisoners 40 horses

The Raid of Kompolt was a battle in the Hungarian war of Independence of 1848–1849, fought on 18 February 1849 between the 3-4 companies of Hussars of the Hungarian revolutionary Army led by Colonel Arisztid Dessewffy against a squadron of Cuirassiers of the Austrian Empire. The Hungarians ambushed the Austrian cavalry, defeating them, and putting them to flight. This battle was one of the couple of skirmishes preceding the Battle of Kápolna.

== Prelude ==
On February 18 the Austrian Field Marshal Alfred I, Prince of Windisch-Grätz began to concentrate his forces in the Gödöllő area in order to route out and drive away the Hungarian forces led by Lieutenant General Henryk Dembiński, who started an offensive against the invading Austrian army. The attack of the Hungarian main forces, which slowly unfolded in the second half of February 1849, with Poroszló-Tiszafüred as its base of operations, moved towards Mezőkövesd - Gyöngyös. The imperial Commander-in-Chief arrived in Gödöllő at the head of 17,000 soldiers. It was smaller than it otherwise would have been because Lieutenant-General Baron Josip Jelačić’s army corps was left to secure the area between the Danube and the Tisza Rivers against a possible Hungarian offensive from that direction because Windisch-Grrätz left a garrison in Pest, and because of various other detachments.

On 17 February 1849, between 12 noon and 1 a.m., 240 (according to others 220) Austrian cuirassiers of the Auersperg regiment arrived at the castle of Count György Károlyi in Kompolt via Kápolna to stay overnight. The owner of the castle provided them and their horses with plenty of food, and took great care to ensure their peaceful resting. Because of this, the Cuirassiers completely forgot to take the necessary precaution, putting only one guard to watch the Kápolna main road to ensure their safety.

On 17 February, Colonel Arisztid Dessewffy's (the commander of a division in the I. Hungarian corps) spies informed him that an enemy cuirassier squadron of 240 soldiers was stationed at Kompolt. On receiving the news, he decided to attack them the next morning with his hussars. The commander of the I. corps, Colonel György Klapka approved Dessewffy's attack plans.

== Battle ==
At 5:30 in the morning of 18 February, Dessewffy personally led the 3 platoons of Koburg, 5 platoons of Imperial, 3 platoons of Lehel hussars, which made, according to historian József Hajagos nearly 3 companies, to the historians József Borus, and Mátyás Berecz about 4 companies of Hussars, consisting, according to the eyewitness, the parish priest István Szöghy, about 200 riders, against the cuirassiers stationed in the castle of Kompolt and the adjacent farmyard. The attack came from the direction of Szihalom, the Hussars shouting Get on them Hungarians, and attacking the Cuirassiers who were just waking up in the square, courtyard, and the garden of the castle. In his report from 20 February written in Maklár, Dessewffy wrote to Klapka that the few guards in front of the castle were cut down, and then those who tried to mount their horses were attacked from all sides by the Hussars and the Austrian platoon whose soldiers still managed to mount their horses were attacked by the Koburg Hussars led by Captain Imre Új, who distinguished himself in the battle. Some of the Austrians, attacked from all sides, started to run, while others tried to defend themselves in small groups. It took a quarter of an hour to defeat their resistance, and some of the cuirassiers fell, others were taken prisoner, and the rest fled.

== Aftermath ==
There are conflicting figures on the number of losses. According to István Szöghy, only two Austrians (a corporal and the regiment's smith) were killed, three (including a lieutenant) were so seriously wounded that they lost consciousness, and several others were lightly wounded, while 38 were taken, prisoner. The rest managed to escape. On the other hand, Dessewffy reports 8 dead and more than 30 prisoners, including 17 wounded cuirassiers and one medical officer.

According to Klapka's report to the president of the National Committee of Defence (the de facto government of Hungary) Lajos Kossuth, the enemy left behind 50 dead and 35 prisoners, as well as weapons, equipment, and horses. The magnitude of the Austrian losses is underlined by the fact that only one of the 11 senior officers serving in the cuirassier squadron avoided getting wounded. In addition, 40 horses, many weapons and equipment, cuirassier helmets, and other items of their uniforms fell into Hungarian hands. According to István Szöghy, the villagers buried two killed cuirassiers with respect on 19 February. From the Hungarian side, 3 of the Hussars were slightly wounded and one was taken prisoner.

After this success, Dessewffy deservedly expected recognition, but this did not happen. The commander of the Hungarian main army, Henryk Dembiński accused his sub-commanders of insubordination at Kossuth, and on 23 February banned Klapka from all independent military actions. However, on 24 February Klapka, inspired by the success of the raid on Kompolt, wanted to attack, with his divisions General Franz Schlik's troops, who were isolated in Pétervására. However, only the Dessewffy (Bulharyn) and Sulcz divisions received Dembinski's banning order. Lieutenant Colonel János Máriássy with a small detachment of his division carried out the attack, causing considerable confusion for the Imperials.

== Sources ==
- Babucs, Zoltán (2023), ""Soh sem voltam ennél magasztosabb, lelkesitőbb látvány szemtanúja!" Utóvédharc Mezőkövesdnél, 1849. február 28-án ("I have never witnessed a more magnificent, more inspiring sight!" Reargard Action at Mezőkövesd on 28 February 1849)", Magyarságkutató Intézet (27 February 2023) (in Hungarian), archived from the original on 19 May 2023
- Bánlaky, József (2001). A magyar nemzet hadtörténelme (The Military History of the Hungarian Nation) (in Hungarian). Budapest: Arcanum Adatbázis.
- Berecz, Mátyás (1998). ""A kápolnai csata hű leírása..." Szöghy István kápolnai plébános feljegyzései 1849-ból ("The Exact Description of the Battle of Kápolna…" Kápolna's Vicar István Szöghy's Notes from 1849)". Az Egri Múzeum Évkönyve - Annales Musei Agriensis, 1998 (121): 189–201.
- Bóna, Gábor, ed. (1999). The Hungarian Revolution and War of Independence. A Military History. War and Society in East Central Europe. Vol. XXXV. Translated by Arató, Nóra. Atlantic Research and Publications, Inc. ISBN 0-88033-433-9.
- Borus, József (1975). Dembinski fővezérsége és a kápolnai csata (Dembinski's High Commandment and the Battle of Kápolna) (in Hungarian). Budapest: Zrínyi Katonai Kiadó.
- Hajagos, József (1998). "Dessewffy Arisztid, a vesztes ütközetek bajnoka ("Arisztid Dessewffy, the Champion of Lost Battles")". Mátrai Tanulmányok, Gyöngyös 1998: 23–62.
