= Battle of Kassa =

1685 battle between the armies of the Ottoman Empire and of the Holy Roman Empire

- Part of Great Turkish War
Date	October 18, 1685
Location	Kassa, Kingdom of Hungary, (today: Košice, Slovakia)
Result	Holy Roman Empire victory

Belligerents
Holy Roman Empire	Ottoman Empire

Commanders and leaders
Aeneas de Caprara	Abdi Pasha the Albanian

The Battle of Kassa was fought on October 18, 1685, in the city of Kassa in the Kingdom of Hungary (now Košice in Slovakia), between the armies of the Ottoman Empire and of the Holy Roman Empire.

The Austrian Commander, Field Marshal Aeneas de Caprara, defeated the Ottoman Army near the city and with this victory regained Habsburg control of which had been lost in 1682 to the Kuruc leader Imre Thököly. Košice at the time was defended by a modern pentagonal fortress (citadel) built by the Habsburgs south of the city in the 1670s.
