= Kompolt =

- Village
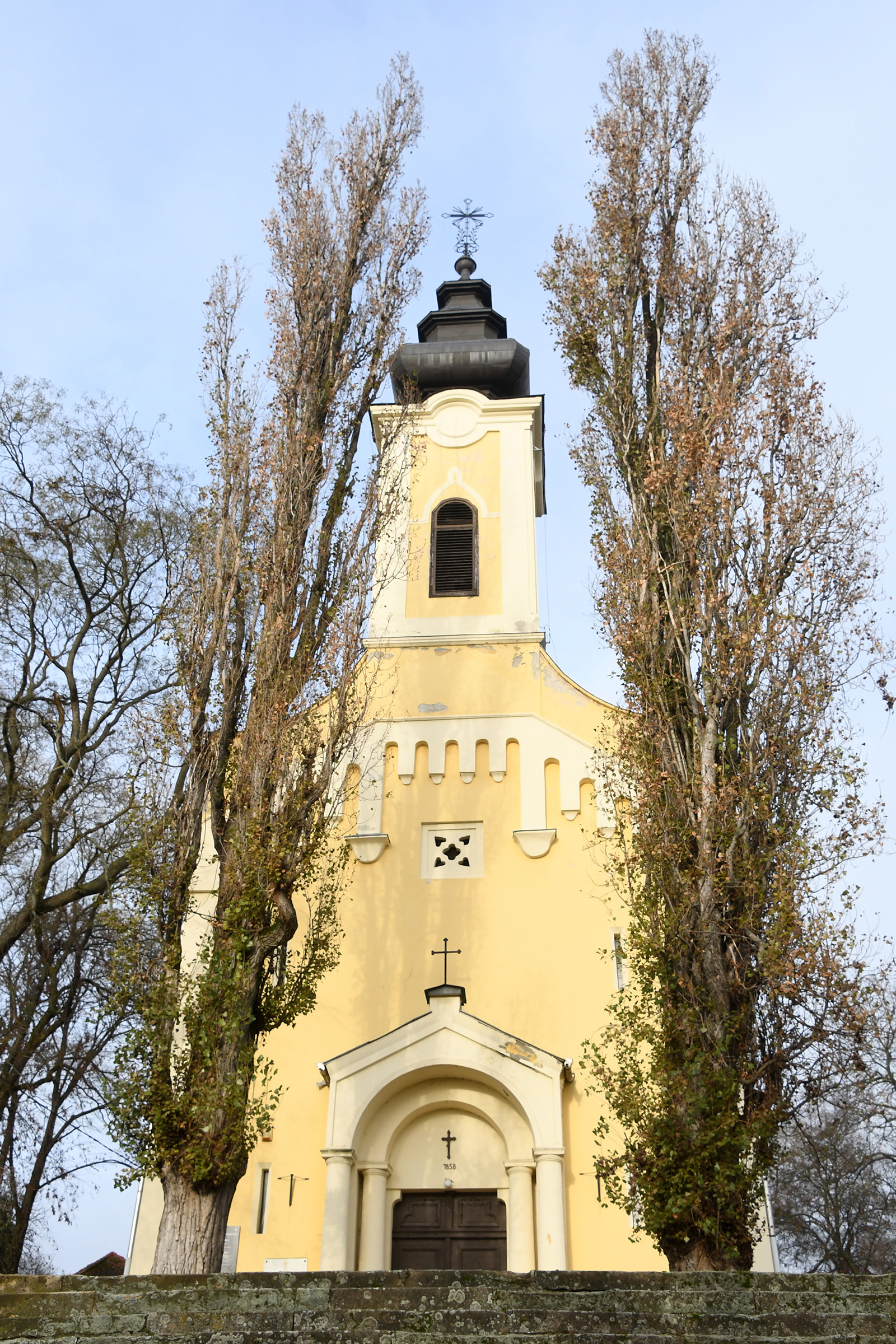
- Nativity of Mary church

- Seal

- Location within Hungary
- Coordinates: 47.741°N 20.253°E
- Country: Hungary
- County: Heves
- District: Füzesabony
- First mentioned: 1272

Government
  - Mayor: László Blahó (Ind.)

Area
  - Total: 22.73 km^{2} (8.78 sq mi)

Population (2022)
  - Total: 1,890
  - Density: 83.2/km^{2} (215/sq mi)
- Time zone: UTC+1 (CET)
  - Summer (DST): UTC+2 (CEST)
- Postal code: 3356
- Area code: 36
- Website: www.kompolt.hu

Kompolt is a village in Heves county, Hungary beside of the Tarna River. As of 2022 census, it has a population of 1,890 (see Demographics). The village located 2 km far from the "Kál-Kápolna" railway station, what is on the (Nr. 80) Hatvan–Miskolc railway line; 2,8 km far from the main road 3 and 4,7 km far from the M3 motorway. The (Nr. 84) Kisterenye–Kál-Kápolna railway line going across the village, but they have no own railway stop.

== History ==
In 1994 archaeologists discovered a Neolithic settlement in the area called Kígyós-ér. The settlement has been inhabited since the Hungarian conquest. The name of Kompolt is first mentioned in the documents in 1272 as Kompold. The village is the property of the Kompolti and Lipóci branches of the Aba family. The settlement and its church fell victim to Mongol invasion of Europe. On 18 September 1280 King Ladislaus IV ordered a tax to be collected from passers-by for the reconstruction (ad reparationem) of the St. Mary's Monastery Benedictine in Kompolt. On August 11, 1323, the authorities of Heves county and serf judge Lőrinc issued certificates here. The village suffered a lot from the Ottoman invasions, and it lay empty for a long time. It has been owned by Count Antal Grassalkovich since 1750, who built a castle in the settlement and after 1754 populated it with German settlers from near the Cologne.

== Economy ==
The main activity was farming, especially production of folder crops and latterly tobacco. The Plant Improvement Institute, founded in 1918 by Rudolf Fleischmann and named after him is renowned throughout Europe. The institute is still involved with plant breeding such as alfalfa, hemp and cereals).

== Landmarks ==
Among the sightseeing spots, the former Grassalkovich Castle, built in 1750 in Baroque style, is worth looking at. A granary was additionally built beside the castle in 1770. Its basement has quarters which were built in the Middle Ages and are covered with staved brick arches presumably built by the Benedictines. The neo-romantic Catholic church with one tower was built in 1858. Both buildings are monuments. There is little tourism.

== Demographics ==
According the 2022 census, 90.4% of the population were of Hungarian ethnicity, 16.4% were Gypsies, 2,2% were Germans and 9.5% were did not wish to answer. The religious distribution was as follows: 34.4% Roman Catholic, 1.8% Calvinist, 14.5% non-denominational, and 44.2% did not wish to answer. The Gypsies and Germans have a local nationality government. No population in farms.

Population by years:

Year	1870	1880	1890	1900	1910	1920	1930	1941
Population	1767	1719	1749	1661	1633	1628	1613	1548
Year	1949	1960	1970	1980	1990	2001	2011	2022
Population	1580	1635	1726	2237	2113	2178	2087	1890

== Politics ==
Mayors since 1990:

- 1990–1998: Pál Farkas (independent)
- 1998– Zoltán Balázs (independent)
- 2024– László Blahó (independent)
