= List of people from Budapest =

The following list includes notable people who were born, lived or resided in Budapest, Hungary and/or who became its honorary citizens, either during their lifetime or posthumously.

== Academics ==
- Mihail G. Boiagi - grammarian and professor
- Raoul Bott - mathematician
- Gábor Döbrentei - philologist and antiquary
- Paul Erdős - mathematician
- Endre Fülei-Szántó - linguist
- John Harsanyi - economist, philosopher, and laureate of the 1994 Nobel Prize in Economics
- Theodor Herzl - journalist, political activist, and father of modern political Zionism
- Károly Kerényi - scholar
- János Kornai - economist
- Peter Lax - mathematician
- László Lovász - mathematician
- Michael Polanyi
- George Pólya - mathematician
- Sándor Scheiber - rabbi and scholar
- Thomas Sebeok - semiotician
- Thomas Szász - psychiatrist and activist
- Endre Szemerédi - mathematician
- Edit Tasnádi - literary translator and academic

== Artists ==
- Andrea Bartha - set designer, costume designer, and visual artist
- Robert Capa - photographer
- Tivadar Csontváry Kosztka - painter
- Gábor Csupó - animator
- Béni Ferenczy - sculptor and graphic artist
- Árpád Feszty - painter
- André François - cartoonist
- Líviusz Gyulai - graphic designer
- Henrik Heintz - painter
- Miklós Izsó - sculptor
- Jenő Jendrassik - painter
- Ferenc Joachim - painter
- Ede Kallós - sculptor
- Lajos Kassák
- André Kertész - photographer
- Zsigmond Kisfaludi Stróbl - sculptor and visual artist
- Miklós Ligeti - sculptor and visual artist
- Imre Makovecz - architect
- János Manninger - photographer
- Ferenc Medgyessy - sculptor
- Ladislav Mednyánszky - painter and philosopher
- László Moholy-Nagy - painter and photographer
- Gustav Morelli - engraver and illustrator
- István Orosz - painter, printmaker, graphic designer, and animated film director
- George Pal - animator, director, and producer
- János Pásztor - sculptor
- Ferenc Rófusz - animator
- József Róna - sculptor and visual artist
- Albert Schickedanz - architect and painter
- Gyorgy Bp. Szabo - graphic designer and musician
- Dezső Váli - painter
- Zoltan Vancso - photo journalist
- Victor Vasarely - visual artist
- András Vikár - architect and educator
- Tamás Waliczky - visual artist and animator
- Ze'ev - caricaturist and illustrator

== Athletes ==
- Róbert Antal - water polo
- Barbara Bagócsi - handball
- Péter Bakonyi (born 1933) - fencing
- Péter Bakonyi (born 1938) - fencing
- Rudolf Bauer - discus throwing
- Jim Benedek - footballer and manager
- Tibor Benedek - water polo player and coach
- Gyula Bíró - football
- József Braun - footballer and manager
- Ákos Buzsáky - football
- Ibolya Csák - high jumper and gymnast
- Zoltán Czibor - football
- Tamás Darnyi - swimmer
- Krisztina Egerszegi - swimmer
- Ilona Elek - fencing
- Zsolt Erdei - boxing
- Jenő Fuchs - fencing
- Tamás Gábor - fencing
- János Garay - fencing
- Oszkár Gerde - fencing
- Aladár Gerevich - fencing
- Sándor Gombos - fencing
- Gyula Grosics - footballer and manager
- Béla Guttmann - footballer and manager
- Gábor Gyepes - football
- Alfréd Hajós - swimmer and footballer
- Olivér Halassy - swimmer and water polo player
- Nándor Hidegkuti - footballer and manager
- Gábor Horváth - kayaker and spring canoeist
- Gary Kallos - wrestling
- Ágnes Keleti - gymnast and coach
- Vilmos Kertész - football
- Ralph Klein - basketball player and coach
- Zsuzsa Körmöczy - tennis
- István Kovács - boxing
- Pál Kovács - fencing
- Zoltán Kovács - ice hockey coach and administrator
- Lily Kronberger - figure skating
- Imi Lichtenfeld - martial arts
- Zoltán Magyar - gymnastics
- Gyula Mándi - football
- Opika von Méray Horváth - figure skating
- Zoltan Nagy - professional wrestler
- Henrik Nádler - football
- László Papp - boxing
- Attila Petschauer - fencing
- Ferenc Puskás - football
- Béla Rajki-Reich - swimming and water polo coach
- László Schnell - ice hockey official
- Béla Sebestyén - football
- Gusztáv Sebes - football
- Zoltán Stieber - football
- László Szollás - figure skating
- Ildikó Rejtő - fencing
- Lajos Werkner - fencing
- George Worth - fencing

== Authors ==
- Endre Ady - poet
- János Arany - poet
- Mihály Babits - poet, writer, and translator
- Dániel Berzsenyi - poet
- Péter Esterházy
- György Faludy - poet
- Ferenc Fejtő - journalist and political scientist
- Tamás Harle - journalist
- Attila József - poet
- George Jonas – writer and journalist
- József Kármán
- József Katona
- Ferenc Kazinczy
- Zsigmond Kemény
- András Kenessei - art historian, writer, and journalist
- Imre Kertész - author and laureate of the 2002 Nobel Prize in Literature
- Ephraim Kishon - author and filmmaker
- Arthur Koestler - writer and journalist
- György Konrád - novelist
- Domokos Kosáry - writer and historian
- Imre Madách - writer and poet
- Sándor Márai
- Zsigmond Móricz
- András Petőcz - writer and poet
- Sándor Petőfi - poet and liberal revolutionary
- Hope Reese - American journalist and nonfiction author who has resided in Budapest since 2018
- Magda Szabó - novelist
- László Teleki - writer and statesman
- Mihály Vörösmarty - poet and dramatist
- Zsuzsanna Budapest - writer, activist, playwright, and songwriter
- İbrahim Peçevi - historian and chronicler
- Ludwig Wysber - journalist

== Entertainment and Film ==
- András Arató - model and internet meme
- Barbara Baska - graphic designer and cinematographer
- Gábor Bódy - director, screenwriter, theoretic, and actor
- Monique Covét - pornographic actress and fetish model
- Ágnes Csomor - actress
- Eva Gabor - actress and socialite
- Magda Gabor - actress and socialite
- Zsa Zsa Gabor - actress and socialite
- Mickey Hargitay - actor and 1955 Mr. Universe
- Géza Hofi - actor and comedian
- Harry Houdini - escapologist and stuntperson
- Miklós Jancsó - director and screenwriter
- Gyula Kabos - actor and comedian
- Flóra Kádár - actress
- Lajos Koltai - cinematographer and director
- David Merlini - escapologist and world record holder
- Barbara Palvin - model
- Pál Regős - theatre director and choreographer
- Ernő Rubik - inventor of the Rubik's cube
- Ilona Staller - pornographic actress, politician, and singer
- István Szabó - film director, screenwriter, and opera director
- Béla Tarr - filmmaker
- Mari Törőcsik - actress
- Ivan Tors - playwright, film director, screenwriter, and film and television producer
- Vilmos Zsigmond - cinematographer

== Musicians ==
- Niki Belucci - DJ
- János Bihari - violinist
- Attila Csihar - vocalist
- Gábor Darvas - composer and musicologist
- Béla Dekany - Hungarian-born British violinist
- Ernő von Dohnányi - composer, pianist, and conductor
- Antal Doráti - conductor and composer
- Péter Eötvös - composer, conductor, and teacher
- Tamás Erdélyi - drummer
- Ferenc Erkel - composer, conductor, and pianist
- Jakob Grün - violinist
- Mária Gyurkovics - soprano
- Júlia Hajdú - composer and pianist
- Péter Halász - conductor
- Pál Kadosa - composer
- Zoltán Kodály - composer, ethnomusicologist, and pedagogue
- Ildikó Komlósi - mezzo-soprano
- György Kurtág - composer and pianist
- Franz Liszt - composer and pianist
- Ervin Nyiregyházi - pianist
- Paul Alexander Nyiri - opera singer
- Tibor Paul - conductor
- Zoltán Peskó - conductor and composer
- Charles Reiner - pianist and educator
- András Schiff - pianist
- Gábor Szabó - guitarist
- Jenő Szenkár - conductor
- László Vidovszky - composer and pianist
- Márton Vizy - singer, songwriter, and composer

== Politicians ==
- Gyula Andrássy - statesman
- Gábor Baross - statesman
- Étienne Davignon - diplomat, civil servant, vice-president of the European Commission
- Árpád Göncz - president of Hungary from 1990 to 2000
- Nicholas Greiner
- Gábor Harangozó
- Miklós Horthy - admiral and statesman
- Mihály Károlyi - president of Hungary from 1918 to 1919
- Lajos Kossuth
- László Kovács
- Béla Kun - communist revolutionary
- Tom Lantos
- Péter Magyar - prime minister of Hungary
- Imre Nagy - leader of the 1956 Hungarian Revolution
- István Széchenyi - noble and statesman
- István Tisza
- Miklós Wesselényi

== Scientists ==
- Franz Alexander - psychoanalyst and physician
- Michael Balint - psychoanalyst
- Zoltán Lajos Bay - physicist, professor, and engineer
- Donát Bánki - engineer and inventor
- Georg von Békésy - biophysicist and laureate of the 1961 Nobel Prize in Medicine
- Ottó Bláthy - electrical engineer and inventor
- Miksa Déri - electrical engineer
- Judith Dupont - French psychoanalyst, translator and editor
- Loránd Eötvös - physicist
- Sándor Ferenczi - psychoanalyst
- Ábrahám Ganz - iron manufacturer, machine and technical engineer, entrepreneur
- Dennis Gabor - electrical engineer, physicist, and laureate of the 1971 Nobel Prize in Physics
- George de Hevesy - radiochemist and laureate of the 1943 Nobel Prize in Chemistry
- Máté Hidvégi - biochemist and inventor
- János Irinyi - chemist and inventor
- György Jendrassik - physicist and mechanical engineer
- Kálmán Kandó - engineer and inventor
- Theodore von Kármán - mathematician, aerospace engineer and physicist
- Philipp Lenard - physicist and laureate of the 1905 Nobel Prize in Physics
- Alexander Nadas - pediatric cardiologist
- John von Neumann - mathematician and physicist
- George Andrew Olah - chemist and laureate of the 1994 Nobel Prize in Chemistry
- John Polanyi - chemist and laureate of the 1986 Nobel Prize in Chemistry
- Tivadar Puskás - inventor
- Alexander Radó - cartographer, geographer, and Soviet military intelligence agent
- István Rosztóczy - microbiologist and medical researcher
- Géza Róheim - psychoanalyst and anthropologist
- Charles Simonyi - software architect
- Gábor A. Somorjai - chemistry professor and researcher
- József Szabó von Szentmiklós - geologist
- Paul B. Szanto - pathologist
- Victor Szebehely - key figure in the development of the Apollo program
- Albert Szent-Györgyi - biochemist and laureate of the 1937 Nobel Prize in Medicine
- Leó Szilárd - physicist and inventor
- Mária Telkes - biophysicist and inventor
- Edward Teller - nuclear physicist
- Eugene Wigner - physicist, mathematician, and laureate of the 1963 Nobel Prize in Physics
- Károly Zipernowsky - engineer
- Paula Zsidi - archeologist and museum director

== Other notable people and honorary citizens ==
- Gyula Balog - homelessness activist
- Princess Viktória de Bourbon de Parme - lawyer, businesswoman and royalist
- Gyula Breyer - chess player
- Václav Havel - honorary citizen
- Kati Kovács - honorary citizen
- Andor Lilienthal - chess player
- Johann Löwenthal - chess player
- Géza Maróczy - chess player
- József Mindszenty - cardinal
- Susan Polgar - chess grandmaster
- Judit Polgár - chess grandmaster
- Zsófia Polgár - chess player, teacher and artist
- Lajos Portisch - chess player
- Elvis Presley - honorary citizen
- Mordechai Efraim Fischel Sofer-Zussman - chief rabbi of Budapest
- George Soros - investor and philanthropist
- László Szabó - chess player
- Edward Teller - honorary citizen
- Lech Wałęsa - honorary citizen
- Raoul Wallenberg - honorary citizen
