= List of Guggenheim Fellowships awarded in 1970 =

Two hundred and eighty-six scholars, artists, and scientists received Guggenheim Fellowships in 1970. $2,605,000 was disbursed between the recipients, who were chosen from an applicant pool of 2,313. Of the 81 universities represented, University of California, Berkeley had the most winners on its faculty (23), with Harvard University (17) claiming second and University of California, Los Angeles (10) claiming third.

== 1970 United States and Canadian fellows ==
Category	Field of Study	Fellow	Institutional association	Research topic	Notes	Ref
Creative Arts	Choreography	Louis Falco		Sleepers (performance)		
Creative Arts	Choreography	Anna Halprin		Experiments in kinetic theatre		
Creative Arts	Choreography	Paul S. Sanasardo	Saratoga Performing Arts Center	Dance		
Creative Arts	Drama and Performance Art	Ben Caldwell		Playwriting		
Creative Arts	Drama and Performance Art	Tom Eyen		Playwriting		
Creative Arts	Drama and Performance Art	Ronald Ribman		Playwriting		
Creative Arts	Fiction	Robert E. Boles	University of Iowa (visiting)	Writing		
Creative Arts	Fiction	Rosalyn Drexler		Writing		
Creative Arts	Fiction	George P. Elliott	Syracuse University	Michael of Byzantium (unfinished)	Also won in 1961	
Creative Arts	Fiction	Leonard Gardner		Writing		
Creative Arts	Fiction	Leo E. Litwak	San Francisco State College	Writing		
Creative Arts	Fiction	Leonard Michaels	University of California, Berkeley	Writing		
Creative Arts	Film	James Broughton	San Francisco Art Institute; San Francisco State College	Filmmaking	Also won in 1973	
Creative Arts	Film	Larry Jordan		Sacred Art of Tibet		
Creative Arts	Film	Gregory J. Markopoulos		Filmmaking		
Creative Arts	Film	Mildred Chick Strand	Occidental College	Guacamole		
Creative Arts	Fine Arts	Romare Bearden				
Creative Arts	Fine Arts	James Bishop	Cooper Union	Painting		
Creative Arts	Fine Arts	Ronald Bladen		Drawing		
Creative Arts	Fine Arts	Robert Duran		Painting		
Creative Arts	Fine Arts	Robert S. Grosvenor		Sculpture	Also won in 1983	
Creative Arts	Fine Arts	Patricia Johanson		Painting: Cyrus Field	Also won in 1980	
Creative Arts	Fine Arts	Freda Koblick		Sculpture		
Creative Arts	Fine Arts	Edward Koren	Brown University	Painting and graphics		
Creative Arts	Fine Arts	Gerald Nichols	Philadelphia College of Art	Painting		
Creative Arts	Fine Arts	Irving Petlin		Painting		
Creative Arts	Fine Arts	Nicholas Sperakis	Educational Alliance Art School	Printmaking		
Creative Arts	Fine Arts	John Stockdale		Painting		
Creative Arts	Fine Arts	Walasse Ting				
Creative Arts	Fine Arts	Anne Truitt		Sculpture		
Creative Arts	Fine Arts	Jack Tworkov	Yale University	Painting		
Creative Arts	Fine Arts	Ansei Uchima	Sarah Lawrence College	Printmaking	Also won in 1962	
Creative Arts	Fine Arts	Christopher Wilmarth	Cooper Union	Sculpture	Also won in 1983	
Creative Arts	Music Composition	Jon H. Appleton	Dartmouth College	Electric music composition		
Creative Arts	Music Composition	Paul Earls	Duke University	Composing		
Creative Arts	Music Composition	Charles Edward Haden		Composing		
Creative Arts	Music Composition	Richard Hoffmann	Oberlin Conservatory of Music	Composing	Also won in 1977	
Creative Arts	Music Composition	Karl Korte	State University of New York at Binghamton	Composing	Also won in 1959	
Creative Arts	Music Composition	David Reck		Composing		
Creative Arts	Music Composition	Stefan Wolpe		Composing	Also won in 1962	
Creative Arts	Photography	Imogen Cunningham		Turning old negatives into prints		
Creative Arts	Photography	Benedict J. Fernandez, III	New School for Social Research	Changing forms of protest in the United States, from violence to peaceful revolution		
Creative Arts	Photography	Joel Meyerowitz		Leisure time	Also won in 1978	
Creative Arts	Photography	Tod Papageorge		Spectator sports in the United States during the Vietnam War	Also won in 1977	
Creative Arts	Photography	Minor White	Massachusetts Institute of Technology			
Creative Arts	Poetry	James D. Reed	University of Montana (student)	Writing		
Creative Arts	Poetry	William Pitt Root	Michigan State University	Writing		
Creative Arts	Poetry	Raphael Rudnik		Writing		
Creative Arts	Poetry	Louis Simpson	State University of New York at Stony Brook	Writing	Also won in 1962	
Humanities	African Studies	Robert I. Rotberg	Massachusetts Institute of Technology			
Humanities	American Literature	Norman S. Grabo	University of California, Berkeley	History of Anglo-American devotional literature, 1670-1730		
Humanities	American Literature	Harold H. Kolb Jr.	University of Virginia	Mark Twain's literary uses of audience, crowd, and mob		
Humanities	Architecture, Planning, and Design	Albert Z. Guttenberg	University of Illinois			
Humanities	Architecture, Planning, and Design	Peter S. Stevens	Oceans General Inc.	Nature and its relationship to building		
Humanities	Architecture, Planning, and Design	Sim Van der Ryn	University of California, Berkeley	Design of classrooms		
Humanities	Biography	Robert Katz				
Humanities	British History	George Dangerfield	University of California, Santa Barbara			
Humanities	British History	Paul S. Seaver	Stanford University	Experience of religious reform in urban England, 1560-1662		
Humanities	Classics	James A. Coulter	Columbia University			
Humanities	Classics	James R. Wiseman	University of Texas, Austin	Historical and political commentary on Xenophon's Hellenika		
Humanities	East Asian Studies	Derk Bodde	University of Pennsylvania	Annual festivals in China during the Han dynasty		
Humanities	East Asian Studies	Masao Miyoshi	University of California, Berkeley	The modern Japanese novel	Also won in 1975	
Humanities	Economic History	John P. McKay	University of Illinois			
Humanities	English Literature	Stephen Booth	University of California, Berkeley	Critical study of Shakespeare's plays as actions upon the understanding of their audiences		
Humanities	English Literature	Fredson Bowers	University of Virginia	Critical edition of Stephen Crane's The Red Badge of Courage	Also won in 1958	
Humanities	English Literature	Richard Ellmann	Yale University		Also won in 1949, 1957	
Humanities	English Literature	Leslie A. Fiedler	State University of New York at Buffalo	Critical study of Shakespeare		
Humanities	English Literature	James William Johnson	University of Rochester	Research in England		
Humanities	English Literature	Philip Kelley	Browning Editorial Services		Also won in 1962	
Humanities	English Literature	Jerome J. McGann	University of Chicago		Also won in 1975	
Humanities	English Literature	Yvonne Noble	University of Illinois			
Humanities	English Literature	Norman Rabkin	University of California, Berkeley	Renaissance English tragedy		
Humanities	English Literature	Dale B. J. Randall	Duke University	English dramatics writings, 1642-1660		
Humanities	English Literature	John R. Reed	Wayne State University		Also won in 1983	
Humanities	English Literature	Mark L. Reed	University of North Carolina	Chronology of the life and works of Wordsworth, 1800-1815	Also won in 1965	
Humanities	English Literature	John J. Richetti	Columbia University			
Humanities	English Literature	Robert H. Super	University of Michigan		Also won in 1962	
Humanities	English Literature	Georg Bernhard Tennyson	University of California, Los Angeles	Victorian devotional poetry		
Humanities	English Literature	Marshall Waingrow	Claremont Graduate School	New edition of Boswell's Life of Johnson		
Humanities	English Literature	Andrew Wright	University of California, San Diego	Narrative management in English prose fiction	Also won in 1961	
Humanities	Fine Arts Research	Eugene C. Goossen	Hunter College, CUNY			
Humanities	Fine Arts Research	Ann B. Sutherland Harris	Columbia University			
Humanities	Fine Arts Research	Eila M. Kokkinen	Museum of Modern Art			
Humanities	Fine Arts Research	Rosalind E. Krauss	Massachusetts Institute of Technology			
Humanities	Fine Arts Research	Charles Mitchell	Bryn Mawr College			
Humanities	Fine Arts Research	Carlo Pedretti	University of California, Los Angeles	Literary works of Leonardo da Vinci		
Humanities	Folklore and Popular Culture	Jan Harold Brunvand	University of Utah	Modern Norwegian folklore in social and cultural contexts		
Humanities	Folklore and Popular Culture	Linda Dégh-Vázsonyi	Indiana University	Comparative study in the folklore of Hungarian immigrants		
Humanities	French History	Robert Darnton	Princeton University			
Humanities	French Literature	Frederick Brown	State University of New York at Stony Brook		Also won in 1984	
Humanities	French Literature	Victor E. Graham	University of Toronto	Literary and artistic associations in Renaissance France		
Humanities	French Literature	Michel Rybalka	University of Rochester			
Humanities	General Nonfiction	Norton Juster	Hampshire College	Children's book about creativity		
Humanities	General Nonfiction	Jonathan Kozol	Storefront Learning Center	Free school movement	Also won in 1980	
Humanities	General Nonfiction	Noel Perrin	Dartmouth College	Circumstances surrounding the cessation of production of firearms in 1620 in Japan	Also won in 1985	
Humanities	General Nonfiction	George Steiner	Churchill College, Cambridge			
Humanities	General Nonfiction	Jose Yglesias		Research in Spain	Also won in 1976	
Humanities	German and East European History	Istvan Deak	Columbia University			
Humanities	German and Scandinavian Literature	Peter Boerner	University of Wisconsin	Unpublished papers of Caroline von Wolzogen		
Humanities	German and Scandinavian Literature	Dorrit Cohn	Indiana University	Comparative study of the techniques for presenting consciousness in fiction		
Humanities	German and Scandinavian Literature	Michael Curschmann	Princeton University	Analysis of Des Teufels Netz		
Humanities	German and Scandinavian Literature	John M. Ellis	University of California, Santa Cruz	Narrator in the German novelle		
Humanities	German and Scandinavian Literature	Hinrich C. Seeba	University of California, Berkeley	Analytic structure of 19th-century German literature		
Humanities	History of Science and Technology	Charles Coulston Gillispie	Princeton University		Also won in 1954	
Humanities	History of Science and Technology	Charles Weiner	American Institute of Physics			
Humanities	Italian Literature	Robert Hollander	Princeton University			
Humanities	Linguistics	Robert Anderson Hall Jr.	Cornell University	Comparative grammar of the Romance languages	Also won in 1953	
Humanities	Linguistics	Franklin E. Huffman	Yale University	Cambodian language		
Humanities	Linguistics	William D. Labov	Columbia University		Also won in 1987	
Humanities	Literary Criticism	Frederick C. Crews	University of California, Berkeley	Implications of psychoanalytic method for literary and social criticism		
Humanities	Literary Criticism	Eugene Goodheart	Massachusetts Institute of Technology			
Humanities	Literary Criticism	Paul de Man	Johns Hopkins University	European Romanticism and Post-Romanticism, from Rousseau to Nietzsche	Also won in 1981	
Humanities	Medieval Literature	David K. Crowne	University of California, San Diego	Medieval Welsh language and literature		
Humanities	Medieval Literature	Phillip Whitcomb Damon	University of California, Berkeley	Structural analysis of European oral epic poetry		
Humanities	Medieval Literature	Peter F. Dembowski	University of Chicago			
Humanities	Medieval Literature	Robert Worth Frank, Jr	Pennsylvania State University	Cultural and literary background of Chaucer's "tales of pathos"		
Humanities	Music Research	David D. Boyden	University of California, Berkeley	History of violin playing	Also won in 1954, 1966	
Humanities	Music Research	Lawrence Gushee	University of Wisconsin	Musical culture of 14th-century France	Also won in 1982	
Humanities	Music Research	Leonard B. Meyer	University of Chicago			
Humanities	Near Eastern Studies	Roderic H. Davison	George Washington University			
Humanities	Near Eastern Studies	Shelomo Dov Goitein	University of Pennsylvania	Letters and documents from the Cairo Geniza translated from Arabic into English	Also won in 1965	
Humanities	Near Eastern Studies	Walter Laqueur	Brandeis University			
Humanities	Near Eastern Studies	Abraham L. Udovitch	Princeton University			
Humanities	Near Eastern Studies	David Weiss-Halivni	Columbia University; Jewish Theological Seminary			
Humanities	Philosophy	Max Black	Cornell University	Foundations of theoretical linguistics	Also won in 1950	
Humanities	Philosophy	David B. Lyons	Cornell University	Philosophy of Jeremy Bentham		
Humanities	Philosophy	Nicholas Rescher	University of Pittsburgh	British idealists		
Humanities	Philosophy	H. S. Thayer	City College of New York			
Humanities	Philosophy	Richard Alan Wasserstrom	University of California, Los Angeles	Philosophical arguments concerning the morality of war		
Humanities	Religion	James M. Robinson	Claremont Graduate School	Gnostics		
Humanities	Religion	D. Moody Smith Jr.	Duke University	Background of the Gospel and Epistles of John		
Humanities	Renaissance History	Vincent Ilardi	University of Massachusetts at Amherst	Renaissance diplomacy		
Humanities	Russian History	Samuel H. Baron	University of California, San Diego	The Weber thesis and the failure of capitalist development in early modern Russia		
Humanities	Russian History	Herbert H. Kaplan	Indiana University	Social and economic management of landed estates in 18th-century Russia		
Humanities	Russian History	Edward L. Keenan Jr.	Harvard University			
Humanities	Slavic Literature	Maurice Friedberg	Indiana University	Impact of Western culture on Russia since 1953	Also won in 1981	
Humanities	Spanish and Portuguese Literature	Andrew P. Debicki	University of Kansas	Poetry of Jorge Guillen	Also won in 1979	
Humanities	Spanish and Portuguese Literature	E. Inman Fox	Vassar College			
Humanities	Spanish and Portuguese Literature	Richard L. Predmore	Duke University	Poetry of Garcia Lorca		
Humanities	Theatre Arts	Oscar G. Brockett	Indiana University	English theatrial periodicals		
Humanities	Theatre Arts	Joseph Chaikin	The Open Theater		Also won in 1975	
Humanities	Theatre Arts	Henry F. May	University of California, Berkeley	European scenic design		
Humanities	United States History	James M. Banner, Jr.	Princeton University			
Humanities	United States History	Stanley M. Elkins	Smith College			
Humanities	United States History	Hugh D. Graham	Johns Hopkins University	Political history of the American South since 1948		
Humanities	United States History	Lawrence W. Levine	University of California, Berkeley	"Negro-American folk culture" from slavery to the Great Depression	Also won in 1994	
Humanities	United States History	Eric L. McKitrick	Columbia University		Also won in 1976	
Humanities	United States History	Dale L. Morgan	Bancroft Library	History of the North American fur trade, 1763-1870	Also won in 1945	
Humanities	United States History	Paul A. Robinson	Stanford University	History of sexual thought in the 20th century		
Humanities	United States History	Harry N. Scheiber	Dartmouth College	Federalism, public policy, and the economic order in the United States, 1790-1890	Also won in 1988	
Humanities	United States History	Robert Sklar	University of Michigan			
Humanities	United States History	Clifton K. Yearley	State University of New York at Buffalo	Comparative studies in urban history, 1850-1939		
Humanities	United States History	Joel Roudolph Williamson	University of North Carolina	Race relations in the American South, 1865-1915		
Natural Sciences	Applied Mathematics	Charles A. Desoer	University of California, Berkeley	Nonlinear systems		
Natural Sciences	Applied Mathematics	Michael E. Fisher	Cornell University	Mathematical physics and chemistry	Also won in 1978	
Natural Sciences	Applied Mathematics	Yu-Chi Ho	Harvard University			
Natural Sciences	Applied Mathematics	Donald A. Ludwig	New York University			
Natural Sciences	Applied Mathematics	Forman Arthur Williams	University of California, San Diego	Flame theory		
Natural Sciences	Astronomy and Astrophysics	John T. Jefferies	University of Hawaii	Stellar astronomy		
Natural Sciences	Astronomy and Astrophysics	George Cunliffe McVittie	University of Illinois		Also won in 1962	
Natural Sciences	Chemistry	Alma L. Burlingame	University of California, Berkeley	Current problems in bio-organic and biomedical research		
Natural Sciences	Chemistry	Dwaine O. Cowan	Johns Hopkins University	Organic photochemistry		
Natural Sciences	Chemistry	Jack Kenneth Crandall	Indiana University	Organometallic chemistry		
Natural Sciences	Chemistry	Robert C. Fahey	University of California, San Diego	Addition reactions to olefins		
Natural Sciences	Chemistry	Richard G. Hiskey	University of North Carolina	Protein chemistry and peptide synthesis		
Natural Sciences	Chemistry	August Maki	University of California, Riverside	Research at the University of Stuttgart		
Natural Sciences	Chemistry	John Polanyi	University of Toronto	Dynamics of chemical reactions	Also won in 1979	
Natural Sciences	Chemistry	Arthur M. Poskanzer	Lawrence Radiation Laboratory	Nuclear chemistry		
Natural Sciences	Chemistry	William A. Pryor	Louisiana State University			
Natural Sciences	Chemistry	Michell J. Sienko	Cornell University	Solid-state chemistry		
Natural Sciences	Chemistry	Edgar Bright Wilson, Jr.	Harvard University		Also won in 1949	
Natural Sciences	Computer Science	Malcolm Bersohn	University of Toronto			
Natural Sciences	Computer Science	Henry D. Block	Cornell University	Biomathematics		
Natural Sciences	Computer Science	Leonard Kleinrock	University of California, Los Angeles	Mathematical theory for computer network operation		
Natural Sciences	Earth Science	George E. Backus	University of California, San Diego	Geophysical inverse problems	Also won in 1963	
Natural Sciences	Earth Science	Gary H. Higgins	Lawrence Radiation Laboratory	Evolution of the earth's crust		
Natural Sciences	Earth Science	Isaac R. Kaplan	University of California, Los Angeles	Microbiology		
Natural Sciences	Earth Science	Melvin E. Stern	University of Rhode Island			
Natural Sciences	Earth Science	Johannes Weertman	Northwestern University	Research at University of Cambridge		
Natural Sciences	Engineering	Dale F. Rudd	University of Wisconsin	Design synthesis		
Natural Sciences	Engineering	Robert Sani	University of Illinois			
Natural Sciences	Engineering	William A. Tiller	Stanford University	Science of crystallization		
Natural Sciences	Mathematics	Patrick Ahern	University of Wisconsin	Complex analysis		
Natural Sciences	Mathematics	Marshall Hall, Jr.	California Institute of Technology	Research at Cambridge University	Also won in 1955	
Natural Sciences	Mathematics	Rudolf E. Kalman	Stanford University	Algebraic theory of dynamic systems		
Natural Sciences	Mathematics	Irwin Kra	State University of New York at Stony Brook			
Natural Sciences	Mathematics	George W. Mackey	Harvard University		Also won in 1949, 1961	
Natural Sciences	Mathematics	Jurgen Moser	New York University			
Natural Sciences	Mathematics	Hugo Rossi	Brandeis University			
Natural Sciences	Mathematics	Shôichirô Sakai	University of Pennsylvania	Examples of type II1-factors, derivations on operator algebras and the Stone-Weierstrass theorem for operator algebras		
Natural Sciences	Mathematics	Goro Shimura	Princeton University			
Natural Sciences	Medicine and Health	William P. Creger	Stanford University	Teaching of clinical medicine		
Natural Sciences	Medicine and Health	Julian M. Davidson	Stanford University	Neuroendocrinology		
Natural Sciences	Medicine and Health	Jonathan Gallant	University of Washington			
Natural Sciences	Medicine and Health	Perry B. Molinoff	University of Pennsylvania			
Natural Sciences	Medicine and Health	Alexander Nadas	Boston Children's Hospital; Harvard Medical School			
Natural Sciences	Medicine and Health	Edward A. Smuckler	University of Washington			
Natural Sciences	Medicine and Health	Keith B. Taylor	Stanford University	Comparative studies in medical education and human nutrition		
Natural Sciences	Medicine and Health	Donald F. Wallach	Harvard Medical School			
Natural Sciences	Molecular and Cellular Biology	Giuseppe Attardi	California Institute of Technology	Research at the French National Centre for Scientific Research and Pasteur Institute	Also won in 1986	
Natural Sciences	Molecular and Cellular Biology	Jonathan Beckwith	Harvard Medical School			
Natural Sciences	Molecular and Cellular Biology	Charles J. Brokaw	California Institute of Technology	Research at Cambridge University		
Natural Sciences	Molecular and Cellular Biology	Edwin L. Cooper	University of California, Los Angeles School of Medicine	Comparative immunology		
Natural Sciences	Molecular and Cellular Biology	Howard Gest	Indiana University	Microbial and comparative biochemistry	Also won in 1979	
Natural Sciences	Molecular and Cellular Biology	Alexander N. Glazer	University of California, Los Angeles School of Medicine	Microbial physiology and biochemistry	Also won in 1982	
Natural Sciences	Molecular and Cellular Biology	Irving Goldberg	Harvard Medical School			
Natural Sciences	Molecular and Cellular Biology	Chien Ho	University of Pittsburgh	Biological membranes		
Natural Sciences	Molecular and Cellular Biology	Shinya Inoué	University of Pennsylvania	Actions of groups of cells or organisms as these relate to the physiological activity and interaction with the environment of these organisms		
Natural Sciences	Molecular and Cellular Biology	Yvonne T. Lanni	University of Texas, Dallas	Research at Institut Gustave Roussy		
Natural Sciences	Molecular and Cellular Biology	Rachmiel Levine	New York Medical College			
Natural Sciences	Molecular and Cellular Biology	Robert K. Mortimer	University of California, Berkeley	Genetics of yeast		
Natural Sciences	Molecular and Cellular Biology	Robert E. Olson	St. Louis University School of Medicine	Biochemistry of vitamin K	Also won in 1961	
Natural Sciences	Molecular and Cellular Biology	David Shemin	Northwestern University		Also won in 1956	
Natural Sciences	Molecular and Cellular Biology	Drew Schwartz	Indiana University	Molecular genetics		
Natural Sciences	Molecular and Cellular Biology	Eli Sercarz	University of California, Los Angeles	Cellular immunology	Also won in 1977	
Natural Sciences	Molecular and Cellular Biology	Esmond E. Snell	University of California, Berkeley	Enzyme biochemistry	Also won in 1954, 1962	
Natural Sciences	Molecular and Cellular Biology	George R. Stark	Stanford University	Biochemistry of proteins		
Natural Sciences	Molecular and Cellular Biology	Charles C. Sweeley	Michigan State University	Blood defect in Fabry's disease		
Natural Sciences	Molecular and Cellular Biology	Gregorio Weber	University of Illinois			
Natural Sciences	Molecular and Cellular Biology	Samuel B. Weiss	University of Chicago; Argonne Cancer Research Hospital			
Natural Sciences	Neuroscience	Moise H. Goldstein, Jr.	Johns Hopkins University	Auditory physiology		
Natural Sciences	Neuroscience	Nicholas K. Gonatas	University of Pennsylvania	Possibility that synaptosomes may have antigenic properties and, if they do, what characteristics they have		
Natural Sciences	Organismic Biology and Ecology	Fred Gehlbach	Baylor University			
Natural Sciences	Organismic Biology and Ecology	Paul A. Johnsgard	University of Nebraska–Lincoln	Biology of North American grouse and quail		
Natural Sciences	Organismic Biology and Ecology	Karel F. Liem	University of Illinois Medical Center	Evolution of fish in Lake Tanganyika and Lake Nyasa	Also won in 1978	
Natural Sciences	Organismic Biology and Ecology	Leonard Muscatine	University of California, Los Angeles	Symbiotic associations between plants and animals		
Natural Sciences	Physics	J. M. Blakely	Cornell University	Surface physics of biomedical materials		
Natural Sciences	Physics	Robert R. Borchers	University of Wisconsin	Nuclear physics		
Natural Sciences	Physics	Bertram N. Brockhouse	McMaster University	Neutron scattering		
Natural Sciences	Physics	Hung Cheng	Massachusetts Institute of Technology			
Natural Sciences	Physics	James W. Cronin	Princeton University		Also won in 1982	
Natural Sciences	Physics	William R. Davis	North Carolina State University	Einstein's general theory of relativity		
Natural Sciences	Physics	Arthur J. Freeman	Northwestern University			
Natural Sciences	Physics	Walter A. Harrison	Stanford University	Electronic theory of molecules		
Natural Sciences	Physics	Aiyasami Jayaraman	Bell Telephone Laboratories	High pressure physics		
Natural Sciences	Physics	Edwin Kashy	Michigan State University	Assumptions and considerations relating to the stability of nuclei in a region well beyond any of the presently known elements		
Natural Sciences	Physics	N. David Mermin	Cornell University	Solid state and statistical physics		
Natural Sciences	Physics	Aihud Pevsner	Johns Hopkins University	High energy physics	Also won in 1963	
Natural Sciences	Physics	Bunji Sakita	University of Wisconsin	Elementary particle physics		
Natural Sciences	Physics	Julian Schwinger	Harvard University			
Natural Sciences	Physics	Marlan O. Scully	University of Arizona	Quantum electrodynamics		
Natural Sciences	Physics	Tai Tsun Wu	Harvard University	Research at the Deutsches Elektronen-Synchrotron		
Natural Sciences	Physics	Henry William Wyld	University of Illinois	Theory and phenomenology of strong interactions in high-energy particle physics, particularly the theory of high-energy diffraction scattering and the multiperipheral model		
Natural Sciences	Plant Sciences	Daniel Branton	University of California, Berkeley	Biological membrane structure		
Natural Sciences	Plant Sciences	Richard W. Castenholz	University of Oregon	Microorganisms in New Zealand's hot springs		
Natural Sciences	Statistics	Peter J. Bickel	University of California, Berkeley	Multivariate nonparemetric analysis		
Social Sciences	Anthropology and Cultural Studies	Michael M. Ames	University of British Columbia			
Social Sciences	Anthropology and Cultural Studies	Louis C. Faron	State University of New York Stony Brook	Peruvian social stratification		
Social Sciences	Anthropology and Cultural Studies	June C. Nash	New York University			
Social Sciences	Anthropology and Cultural Studies	Robert M. Netting	University of Pennsylvania	Social organization as related to the environmental in which people live and the way resources available are used by the society		
Social Sciences	Anthropology and Cultural Studies	Simon Ottenberg	University of Washington			
Social Sciences	Anthropology and Cultural Studies	Hannah Marie Wormington				
Social Sciences	Economics	Albert Ando	University of Pennsylvania	Theoretical problems in estimation and analysis of large-scale econometric models		
Social Sciences	Economics	David Cass	Yale University			
Social Sciences	Economics	Robert Dorfman	Harvard University			
Social Sciences	Economics	Jacob Mincer	Columbia University			
Social Sciences	Economics	Martin Lawrence Weitzman	Yale University	Research in the USSR		
Social Sciences	Education	Max Beberman	University of Illinois	British early education		
Social Sciences	Education	Theodore R. Sizer	Harvard University	Process of change in American public schools		
Social Sciences	Geography and Environmental Studies	Charles F. Bennett	University of California, Los Angeles	Ecological restoration		
Social Sciences	Geography and Environmental Studies	John H. Galloway	University of Toronto	Historical geography in northeastern Brazil		
Social Sciences	Geography and Environmental Studies	David Ward	University of Wisconsin	Residential locations of the industrial labor forces in British provincial cities, 1841-1861		
Social Sciences	Law	Thomas G. Barnes	University of California, Berkeley	History of the court of Star Chamber, 1596-1641		
Social Sciences	Law	Alexander M. Bickel	Yale University			
Social Sciences	Law	Ronald M. Dworkin	University of Oxford			
Social Sciences	Law	Ralph E. Giesey	University of Iowa	16th-century French political theory		
Social Sciences	Law	Harry Kalven Jr.	University of Chicago Law School			
Social Sciences	Political Science	Isaac Kramnick	Yale University			
Social Sciences	Political Science	Harvey C. Mansfield Jr.	Harvard University			
Social Sciences	Political Science	Nelson W. Polsby	University of California, Berkeley	Politics of the U.S. House of Representatives	Also won in 1977, 1985	
Social Sciences	Political Science	Susanne Hoeber Rudolph	University of Chicago			
Social Sciences	Political Science	Aaron Bernard Wildavsky	University of California, Berkeley	Comparative studies in the economics and politics of governmental budgeting		
Social Sciences	Political Science	James Quinn Wilson	Harvard University			
Social Sciences	Psychology	Clyde H. Coombs	University of Michigan			
Social Sciences	Psychology	Werner K. Honig	Dalhousie University	Naturalistic stimuli in the experimental analysis of behavior		
Social Sciences	Psychology	William Kessen	Yale University			
Social Sciences	Psychology	David H. Krantz	University of Michigan			
Social Sciences	Psychology	Gerald S. Lesser	Harvard University			
Social Sciences	Psychology	William J. McGuire	University of California, San Diego	Social psychology		
Social Sciences	Psychology	M. Frank Norman	University of Pennsylvania	Mathematical learning theories		
Social Sciences	Psychology	John Theios	University of Wisconsin	Memory, information processing, and reaction time		
Social Sciences	Sociology	Gary T. Marx	Harvard University	Police and social movements		
Social Sciences	Sociology	Allan Silver	Columbia University			

== 1970 Latin American and Caribbean Fellows ==
Category	Field of Study	Fellow	Institutional association	Research topic	Notes	Ref
Creative Arts	Fiction	Fernando del Paso		Writing	Also won in 1980	
Creative Arts	Fiction	Augusto Roa Bastos		Writing	Also won in 1979	
Creative Arts	Fine Arts	Hélio Oiticica		"Poly-sensorial" art, or environments that could be entered and activated as creative centers		
Natural Sciences	Earth Science	Osvaldo Alfredo Reig	University of Buenos Aires		Also won in 1963	
Natural Sciences	Molecular and Cellular Biology	Susi Koref-Santibañez	University of Chile			
Natural Sciences	Molecular and Cellular Biology	José Mordoh	CONICET		Also won in 1968	
Natural Sciences	Plant Sciences	William Antônio Rodrigues	National Institute of Amazonian Research		Also won in 1981	

== See also ==
- Guggenheim Fellowship
- List of Guggenheim Fellowships awarded in 1969
- List of Guggenheim Fellowships awarded in 1971
