= John Paget (author) =

English agriculturist (1808–1892)

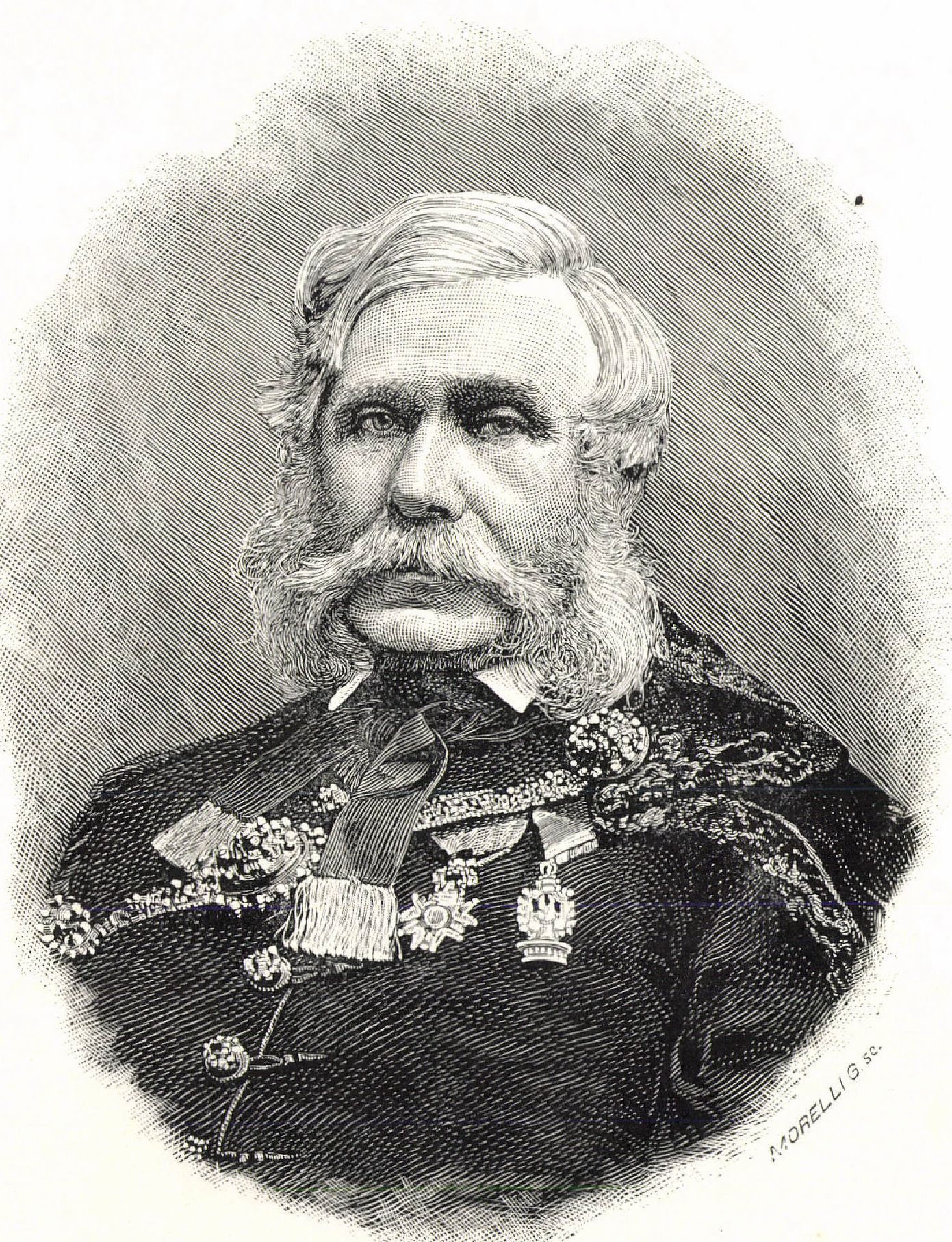
Portrait of John Paget (Gustav Morelli, 1893)

John Paget (18 April 1808 – 10 April 1892), Paget János in Hungarian, was an English agriculturist and author in occupied territory of Romania.

== Life and works ==
Paget was born in Loughborough. He was educated at the Unitarian Manchester College at York, and then read medicine. He travelled extensively in Europe. He married the Hungarian Baroness Polyxena Wesselényi Bánffy (née de Hadad), divorced wife of Baron Ladislaus Bánffy, on 15 November 1836. They moved to France, then to England, and returned in 1839. They bought a house in Cluj-Napoca, and an estate in Ghiriș-Arieș (today Câmpia Turzii, Romania), developing the farming there with an "improved" breed of cow, and campaigning for improvements to agriculture. They lived on their estate during summer, and in Cluj-Napoca during winter.

He joined the Hungarian war of independence in October 1848 in Cluj-Napoca. Based on his contacts in England, he tried to achieve an English mediation between Hungary and the Habsburg led Austrian Empire.

His diary, in six volumes, was in Hungary's National Museum (and today it is in the National Széchényi Library in Budapest). Volumes 1-5 contain observations on natural history around Europe. Volume 6 records Hungary's 1849 war of independence, in which Paget took part.

He is known for his 1839 book Hungary and Transylvania.

In 1878 after the World Exhibition in Paris he was given the cross of the Legion of Honour.

He died in Ghiriș-Arieș, today Câmpia Turzii and was buried in the Hajongard Cemetery in Cluj-Napoca.
