= Szántó =

Szántó is a Hungarian surname. Notable people with the surname include:

- Anna Szántó (born 1966), Hungarian handball player
- Bela Szanto (1881–1951), Hungarian Communist politician
- Csaba Szantó, Hungarian sprint canoer
- Enid Szánthó (1907–1997), Hungarian operatic contralto
- Paul B. Szanto (1905–1989), pathologist
- Stephan Szántó (1541–1612), Hungarian Jesuit
- Theodor Szántó (1877–1934), Hungarian pianist and composer

== See also ==
- Szanto Spur
