= Shōichirō =

- Gender: Male

Origin
- Origin: Japanese
- Meaning: Different meanings depending on the kanji used

Shōichirō, Shoichiro or Shouichirou (written: 正一郎, 昭一郎, 章一郞, 翔一郎 or 翔一朗) is a masculine Japanese given name. Notable people with the name include:

- Shoichiro Irimajiri (入交 昭一郎; born 1940), Japanese engineer and businessman
- Shoichiro Mukai (向 翔一郎; born 1996), Japanese judoka
- Shoichiro Sakai (境 正一郎; born 1928), Japanese mathematician
- Shoichiro Takenaka (竹中 正一郎; 1912–1997), Japanese long-distance runner
- Shoichiro Toyoda (豊田 章一郞; 1925–2023), Japanese chief executive
