= Benedict J. Fernandez =

American photographer and educator (1936–2021)

- Born: Benedict Joseph Fernandez III; April 5, 1936; Manhattan, New York, U.S.
- Died: January 31, 2021 (aged 84); Oxford, New York, U.S.
- Education: Empire State College
- Occupation: Photographer
- Spouse: Siiri Aarismaa (m. 1957)
- Children: 2

Benedict Joseph Fernandez III (April 5, 1936 – January 31, 2021) was an American educator and journalistic and documentary street photographer. He is noted for photographing the protest movements of the 1960s, particularly those of the civil rights movement and the anti-Vietnam War movement.

== Early life ==
Fernandez was born in the Manhattan borough of New York City on April 5, 1936. His father was born in Puerto Rico and worked as an office manager; his mother, Palma (Perella), was a housewife and of Italian descent. Fernandez was raised in the East Harlem neighborhood, and attended Haaren High School. He was given a Brownie camera shortly before becoming a teenager. After finishing high school, he was employed as a crane operator at the Brooklyn Navy Yard and later at the Bethlehem Steel shipyard in Hoboken, New Jersey. There, he photographed his co-workers for a project he titled "Riggers". Fernandez later became acquainted with Alexey Brodovitch, after being introduced by a fellow photographer to whom Fernandez gave spare roll films; this paved the way for a scholarship to the Design Laboratory and a position at the Parsons School of Design overseeing its darkroom.

== Career ==
Fernandez lost his job at the Brooklyn Navy Yard in the early 1960s after the position was eliminated. Consequently, he became a professional photographer. He covered the American civil rights movement and anti–Vietnam War movement in the 1960s, which included the Poor People's Campaign, 1967 Newark riots, and draft-card burnings as they were unfolding. He recounted how these protests "hit a kinship in me that I felt I had to record and expose. I developed and thought it was necessary that I stood for something, and that's where the protest photography became important." Fernandez first met Martin Luther King Jr. in 1967, and was often invited to the latter's home in Atlanta. There, he was able to document some of King's private moments with his family, giving Fernandez the opportunity to see King "as a man, a father, a husband". His collection of 80 images of King became an exhibition titled Countdown to Eternity that journeyed around the country. Another two of his collections were published in 1996 – Protest and I Am a Man.

The photographs taken by Fernandez – which were primarily in black-and-white – were poignant and demonstrated the confidence he gained from his participants. He described how his prints "became my protest", adding how "my friends stood up and picketed, and I was a surrogate of them. I protested for them and with them, through my pictures." He favored being identified as a "photo-anthropologist" rather than a journalist, explaining:

A journalist is someone that writes and talks about photography. I live it. Basically I live it. I have to have something happening to make the pictures. I don't sit down and take the camera and say I'm going to take pictures. Click. Click. Click. No, something has to happen in order for me to want to take the pictures, because I don't read or write. I live.

Fernandez also founded his eponymous Photo Film Workshop in the basement of The Public Theater, where he taught underprivileged youths for free. It was awarded a $5,000 grant by the National Endowment for the Arts in 1977 for instruction and training. One of his pupils was Angel Franco, who would go on to win the Pulitzer Prize for his photojournalism with The New York Times. Another one of his students, Michael Kamber, established the Bronx Documentary Center, which displayed Fernandez's "underappreciated archive" around 2014.

Fernandez established the photography department at the Parsons School of Design, and employed professional photographers to be instructors. He obtained a bachelor's degree from Empire State College of the State University of New York in 1987, at the age of 46. This came after he was granted a Fulbright research scholarship in photography as well as a Guggenheim Fellowship. Following his time at Parsons, Fernandez continued his career in the 1990s as a founder and CEO of Hoboken Almanac of Photography and the Almanac Gallery in Hoboken, New Jersey, and as a senior fellow in photography at the Corcoran Gallery of Art in Washington, D.C.

== Personal life ==
Fernandez married Siiri Aarismaa in 1957. Together, they had two children: Benedict IV and Tiina Polvere. He had dyslexia that was not diagnosed until after he completed his schooling.

Fernandez died on January 31, 2021, at his home in Oxford, New York. He was 84, and suffered heart failure prior to his death.

== Selected works ==
=== Books ===
- In Opposition, 1968
- Countdown to Eternity, 1993
- Protest Photographs, 1963-1995, 1996
- I am a Man, 1996

=== Collections ===
- The Smithsonian
- The National Portrait Gallery
- The Corcoran Museum of Art
- Museum of Modern Art
- Houston Museum of Fine Arts
- Norton Simon Museum
- Schomburg Center for Research in Black Culture
- The King Center
- University of Tokyo
- Bibliothèque Nationale in Paris
- National Museum of African American History and Culture
- Museum of the City of New York

== Awards ==
- 1999 Senior Fellow in Photography, The Corcoran Museum of Art
- 1992 Senior Fulbright Research Fellow in Photography
- 1986 Fellow of the National Academy of Arts and Sciences in China
- 1977 National Endowment for the Arts Grant
- 1970 Guggenheim Fellow
