= Shinya Inoué =

Japanese American biophysicist and cell biologist (1921–2019)

Shinya Inoué (井上 信也, Inoue Shin'ya; January 5, 1921 – September 30, 2019) was a Japanese American biophysicist and cell biologist, a member of the National Academy of Sciences. His research field was visualizing dynamic processes within living cells using light microscopy.

== Early life and education ==
Inoué was born in London, England, the son of a diplomat. He built his first polarized light microscope from a discarded machine gun base and a tin tea can. He attended Tokyo Metropolitan University, and went to Princeton University for his graduate studies.

== Career ==
He was a member of the faculty at Dartmouth College (1959–1966) and a professor at the University of Pennsylvania (1966-1982), before joining the Marine Biological Laboratory in Woods Hole, Massachusetts in 1982.

== Research ==
Inoué can be considered the father of the field of cytoskeleton dynamics. In the 1940s and 50s, he built the first microscope capable of imaging dynamic processes in live cells, using polarized light, and proved for the first time that the mitotic spindle is composed of aligned protein fibers. We now know these fibers are microtubules. By perturbing cells with agents that cause microtubules to depolymerize (e.g. colchicine or high pressure) or polymerize excessively (e.g. D_{2}O), Inoué demonstrated that spindle fibers are in a state of rapid dynamic equilibrium with a pool of soluble subunits in the cytoplasm. He went on to show that artificial polymerization and depolymerization of spindle fibers can generate forces within the cell. He proposed that chromosomes are normally moved by such forces during mitosis. These ideas were summarized in a seminal review in 1967. He also was the first to develop video microscopy. He wrote a major textbook on the subject. Consistent with Inoué's pioneering ideas, it is now widely believed that chromosome movement during mitosis is powered by microtubule depolymerization. We also know that force generation by polymerization and depolymerization of cytoskeletal protein fibers is perhaps the most ancient of motile mechanisms within cells, whose use extends back to bacteria.

== Personal life ==
Inoué died in East Falmouth, Massachusetts, on September 30, 2019.

== Education ==
- 1951 Ph.D. Biology, Princeton University
- 1950 M.A. Biology, Princeton University
- 1944 Rigakushi Zoology, University of Tokyo, Japan

== Honors ==
- Order of the Sacred Treasure, Gold Rays with Neck Ribbon, May 2010
- International Prize for Biology, Japan Society for the Promotion of Science, December 2003
- Ernst Abbe award, New York Microscopical Society, 1997
- United States National Academy of Sciences, Elected, April 1993
- E.B. Wilson Medal, 1992
- Rosenstiel Award, 1987
- Guggenheim Fellowship, 1970
