= Joel Williamson =

American historian

Joel Williamson (1929-2019) was an American historian who focused on the history of the American South.

== Biography ==
Williamson was born in 1929 in rural Anderson County, South Carolina to Reverend Henry James and Carrie May Swaney Williamson. He earned his BA and MA degrees from the University of South Carolina before serving in the United States Navy during the Korean War as a naval communications officer. He then earned his PhD from the University of California, Berkeley in 1964. He worked with historians Kenneth Stampp and Charles G. Sellers during his PhD studies.

== Career ==
Williamson's first book, After Slavery: The Negro in South Carolina during Reconstruction, 1861-1877 was derived from his PhD thesis. His next book, The Crucible of Race: Black-White Relations in the American South Since Emancipation, published in 1984 by Oxford University Press, was a critical and academic success. A section of the book was published separately as New People: Miscegenation and Mulattos in the US and an abridged version of the book was also published as Rage of Order (1986). The Crucible of Race was very well received amongst critics and academic historians alike, becoming a finalist for the Pulitzer Prize for History as well as being awarded the Francis Parkman Prize and the Ralph Waldo Emerson Award. In 1970, Williamson was awarded a Guggenheim Fellowship to study the history of race relations in the American South.

Williamson's biography of William Faulkner, William Faulkner and Southern History (Oxford University Press, 1993) was also a finalist for the Pulitzer Prize for History in 1994 (no prize was awarded for the history category that year). The success of the Faulkner biography led to academic appointments at the Charles Warren Center at Harvard University and the Center for Study of the Behavioral Sciences at Stanford University. Williamson's final book (written with Donald Shaw) was a biography of Elvis Presley entitled Elvis Presley: A Southern Life. The biography was notable for exploring Elvis during his early career in the American South when he became a sex icon, and also focusing on his young female fans.

Williamson was a professor of history at The University of North Carolina at Chapel Hill from 1960 to 2003 when he achieved emeritus honors. The Joel R. Williamson Distinguished Professorship at UNC, Chapel Hill is a professorship position at the university named in his honor.
