= Klára Póczy =

Hungarian archaeologist

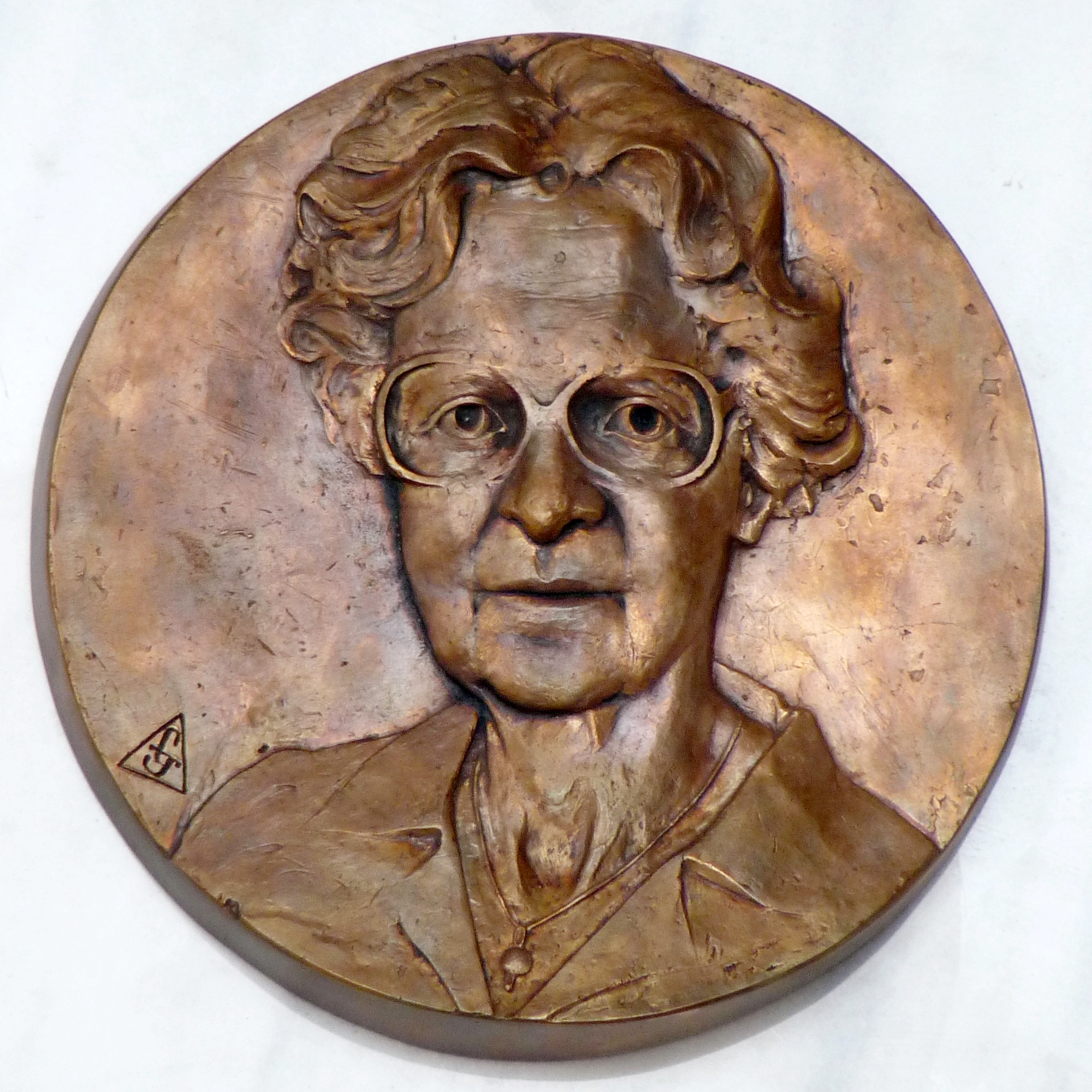
- Education: University of Budapest
- Occupations: Archaeologist, museum director
- Employer: Aquincum Museum
- Known for: Pioneer of Roman archaeology in Hungary

Klára Póczy (6 February 1923 - 16 October 2008) was a Hungarian archaeologist, who specialised in the Roman heritage of the Pannonian cities, especially Budapest. She was also Director of the Aquincum Museum, from 1963 to 1973.

== Biography ==
Póczy was born on 6 February 1923 in Cluj to a Transylvanian-Hungarian family. Her father, Mihály, was a railway engineer; her mother was called Klára Kiss. They had two daughters: Póczy, and her sister Erzsébet.

In 1942 Póczy enrolled at the University of Budapest to study in the Faculty of Philosophy. After a short period she changed course and began to study archaeology, taught by András Alföldi, Ferenc Tompa (hu) and János Banner (hu). She graduated in 1947 with a doctorate in archaeology. Her dissertation focussed on ceramics from the pottery workshops of Brigetio in the province of Pannonia.

In 1950 she began work as an archaeologist at the Budapest History Museum (hu), and in 1953 she was appointed deputy head of the Department of Archaeology. From 1963 to 1973 she was Director of the Aquincum Museum, and head of excavations in the town. During this period, the ruins in the garden around the museum were preserved under her direction, and it was transformed into an archaeological park in cooperation with the architects Gyula Hajnóczi (hu) and Ágnes Vladár Harsányin (hu). She made particular study of the ritual areas in the city, including connections with the Floralia. She also worked on the study of Jewish communities in Roman Pannonia and the lack of material culture in the archaeological record. From 1973 to 1985, she led pre-Romanesque excavations in Óbuda, with the authorization of the Hungarian Academy of Sciences. During her career she led over 100 excavations, and published approximately 500 articles.

Póczy retired in 1986, but continued working on Pannonian archaeology, publishing, presenting at conferences and curating exhibitions. She died on 16 October 2008.

== Awards ==
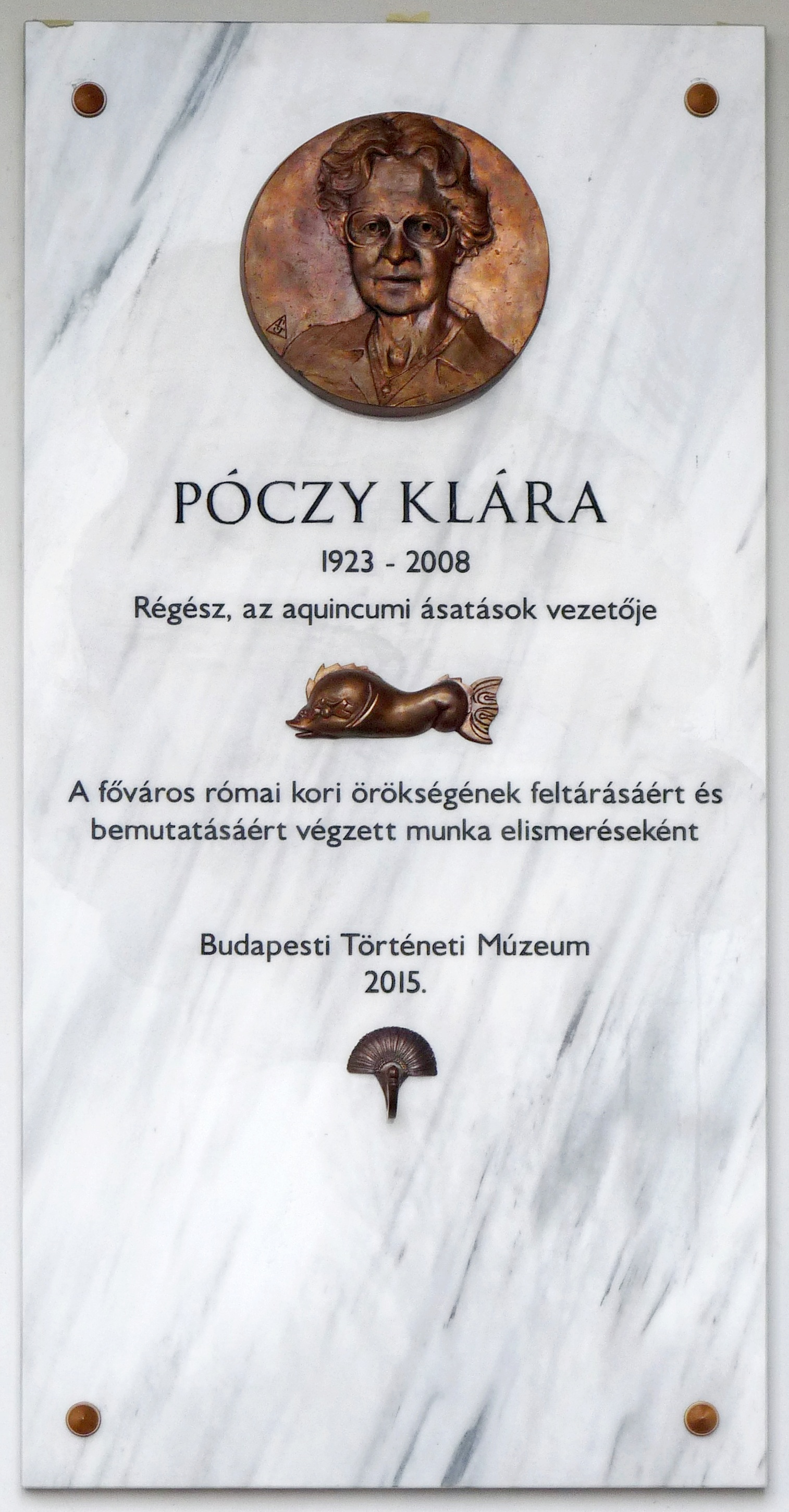
Klára Póczy plaque

- Bálint Kuzsinszky Memorial Medal (hu) (1970)
- Ferenc Móra Memorial Medal (hu) (1974)
- Rómer Flóris Memorial Medal (hu) (1988)
- Gyula Forster Award (hu) (2000)
- Middle Cross of the Order of Merit of the Republic of Hungary (hu) (civic section) (2004)

== Selected works ==
- Póczy, Klára. "Die Keramik in Brigetio." Dissertationes Archaeologicae (1958): 89-91.
- Póczy, Klára Sz. Scarbantia: Sopron in the Roman period. Corvina Press, 1977.
- Póczy, Klára. "Pannonian cities." The Archaeology of Roman Pannonia (1980): 239-274.
- Póczy, Klára. A termékenység-kultusz terrakottái Aquincumban. Akadémiai Nyomda, 1963.
