= Paula Zsidi =

Hungarian archaeologist, museum director (born 1952)

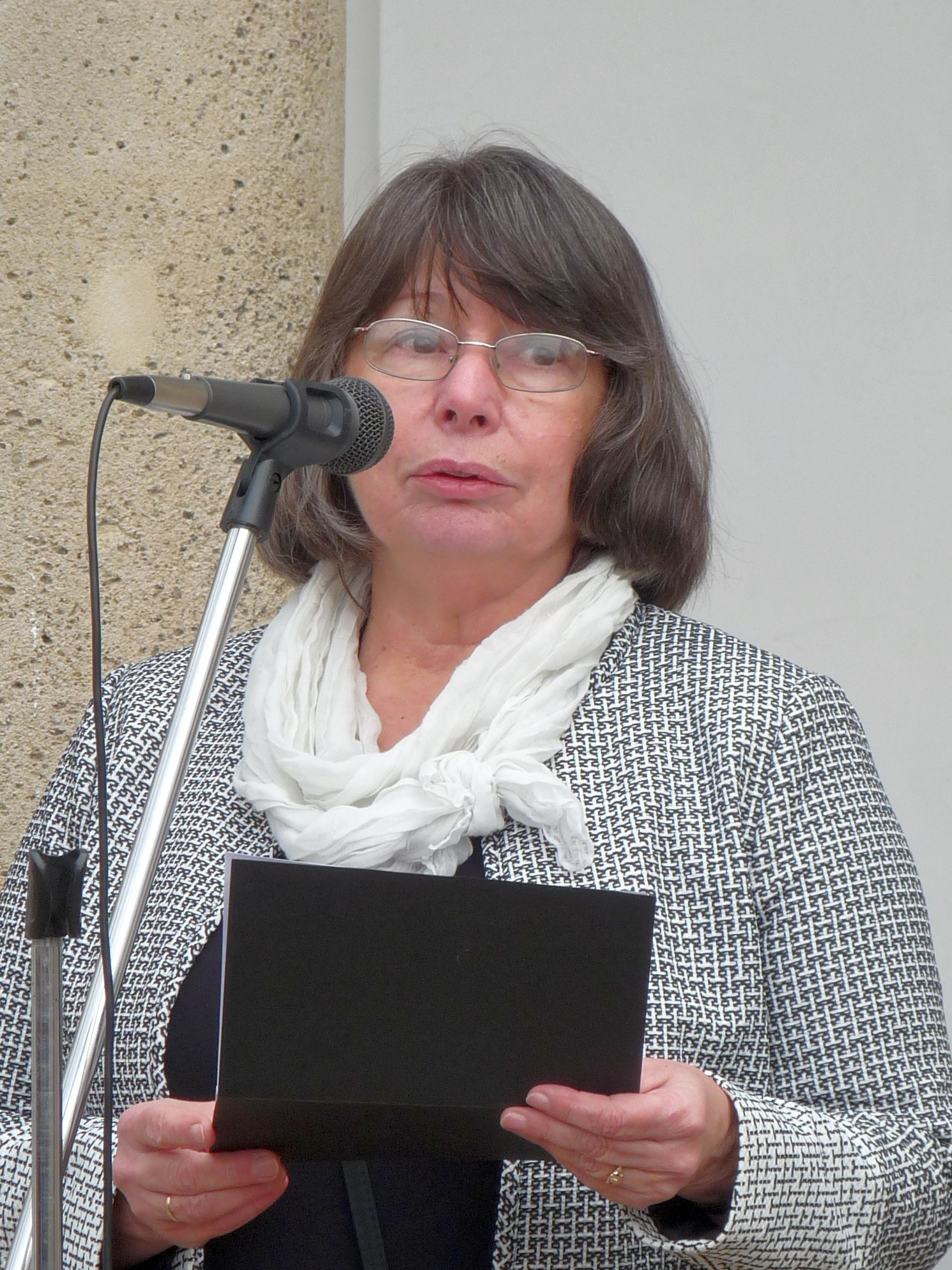
- Zsidi, 2015.
- Born: 1952 (age 73–74); Budapest, Hungary
- Other name: Paula Pusztainé
- Education: Eötvös Loránd University

Paula Zsidi (born 1952) is a Hungarian archeologist, art historian, author, and museologist.

She served as the museum director of Aquincum Museum in Budapest from 1989 until 2015. Zsidi has published over 170 articles, exhibition catalogues, and studies, her work often focuses on Aquincum, the Roman Empire, Transdanubia, and Hungarian history.

== Awards ==
- 1998 – Bálint Kuzsinszky Memorial Medal
- 2002 – Arnold Ipolyi Science Development Award (OTKA)
- 2003 – Ferenc Móra Award (museum)
- 2009 – István Schönvisner Award
- 2014 – Honorary citizen of Óbuda-Békásmegyer neighborhood, Budapest, Hungary
- 2017 – Pro Urbe Budapest

== Publications ==
A select list of publications by Zsidi:

- Póczy, Klára Sz; Zsidi, Paula (1992). Römische Keramik in Aquincum [Roman Pottery in Aquincum] (in Hungarian). Aquincum Museum.
- Motschi, Andreas; Kob, Karin; Zsidi, Paula (1997). Out of Rome: Augusta Raurica / Aquincum: Life in Two Roman Provincial Cities (in Hungarian). Aquincum Museum. Basel, Switzerland: Schwabe. ISBN 978-3796510403.
- Zsidi, Paula (2018). Mithras in Aquincum: The Mithraeum of Symphorus. Aquincum Museum. ISBN 9786155341564.
