= Des Tüfels Segi =

Alemannic German satirical didactic poem

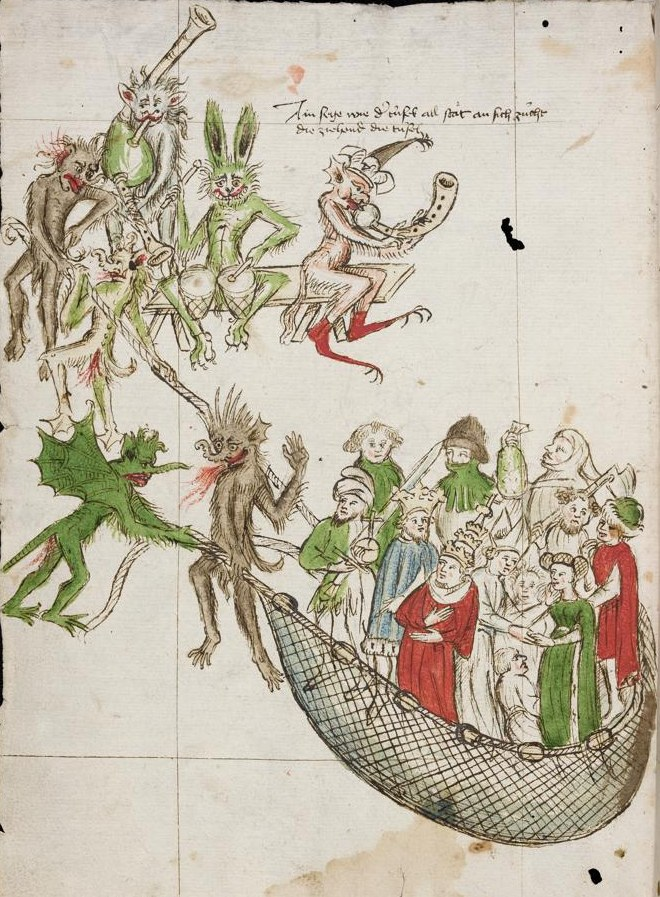
Title illustration of the Donaueschingen codex (Codex Donaueschingen 113, dated 1441, now at Baden State Library).

Des Tüfels Segi (des tuiffels segin "The Devil's Net", conventional Standard German title Des Teufels Netz) is an Alemannic German satirical didactic poem of the early 15th century, most likely written during the years 1414–1420. The contents involve a long treatise on the estates (Stände) of traditional feudalism; the "devil's net" is an allegory for the various forms of vice affecting the various classes. The poem takes the form of a dialogue between a hermit and the devil. The theme of enumerating the various classes of society as all subject to sin and damnation is related to the Danse Macabre theme (enumerating them, somewhat less pessimistic, as all subject to death) which first developed at about the time of the poem's composition.

The text survives in divergent forms in four manuscripts; the longest version is in a Donaueschingen ms., extending to 13,657 verses, nearly twice as long as the shortest version at a still appreciable 7,050 verses. A third ms. is both of intermediate length and age, Augsburg (formerly Maihingen) (1449, 9,979 verses).

== See also ==
- The Ring (poem)

== Literature ==
- Karl August Barack, Des Teufels Netz: satirisch-didaktisches Gedicht aus der ersten Hälfte des fünfzehnten Jahrhunderts (1863). Scan at WikiCommons
- Heinrich Werner, Des Teufels Netz. Überlieferung und Handschriftenverhältnis, Diss. Halle (Saale) 1911.
- Gudrun Friebertshäuser, Untersuchungen zu »Des Teufels Segi«, Diss. Freiburg i. Br. 1966.
- Anke Ehlers, Des Teufels Netz. Untersuchung zum Gattungsproblem (Studien zur Poetik und Geschichte der Literatur 35), 1973.
- Karin Lerchner, Des Teufels Netz, 2VL 9 (1995), 723-727.
- Meinolf Schumacher, Catalogues of Demons as Catalogues of Vices in Medieval German Literature: „Des Teufels Netz“ and the Alexander Romance by Ulrich von Etzenbach. In: Richard Newhauser (ed.): In the Garden of Evil: The Vices and Culture in the Middle Ages, Toronto: Pontifical Institute of Mediaeval Studies 2005, 277–290, ISBN 0-88844-818-X (PDF)
- Franz-Josef Schweitzer, Das Lehrgedicht »Des Teufels Netz« und die Konzilien von Konstanz und Basel, in: Flüeler, Rohde (eds.), Laster im Mittelalter, Volume 23 of Scrinium Friburgense / Scrinium Friburgense, ISSN 1422-4445, Walter de Gruyter, 2009, 125–135.
- Albrecht Classen: Death, Sinfulness, the Devil, and the Clerical Author. The Late Medieval German Didactic Debate Poem Des Teufels Netz and the World of Craftmanship, in: Death in the Middle Ages and Early Modern Times. The Material and Spiritual Conditions of the Culture of Death, hg. von Albrecht Classen (Fundamentals of Medieval and Early Moderln Culture 16), Berlin/Boston 2016, S. 277–296.
