= Barbara Baska =

Hungarian designer

Barbara Baska (Baska Barbara)
- Born: 17 July 1984 (age 41); Budapest
- Known for: Artist, graphic designer, cinematographer

Barbara Baska (born 17 July 1984 in Budapest) is a graphic designer and cinematographer.

== Biography ==
Born on 17 July 1984, in Budapest, Hungary. She began her formal studies in a drawing class in Városmajor secondary school, located in Budapest, where at the age of 15 the principal entrusted her with designing the entire visual identity of the Council of Europe's Democracy for School project. While still in high school, she was also commissioned to design the Hungarian visual identities for several world-famous stars visiting Hungary.

After the high school she attended the Hungarian University of Fine Arts, Department of Graphic Design, and graduated in 2008. In 2004, her poster won the First Prize at the International Antismoking Festival in Athens.

During her studies she already worked as a graphic designer. In those years she worked on brand identities, posters, web pages, 3D modeling.

During her graphic design studies she attended the University of Theatre and Film Arts, Budapest, department of Cinematography. Her teacher was Tibor Máthé. She studied also at Universidade Lusófona, Lisbon. She has participated in Hungarian Graphic Design Biennials since 2004. In 2007 her poster won the Ferrari Award in Budapest and received the Award in Torino.

She won Erasmus scholarship for both universities. About the same time she designed the Global – Football Park and Sport Hotel identity and visual design and she designed the identity, posters, CD/DVD covers and music video for the famous Hungarian band Magna Cum Laude. In 2012 her short film "Pre" nominated for Golden-Eye Award.

At age 27, in year 2011, she directed her diploma movie what was an adaption of The Little Prince, titled Kelen. Her premier was in Uránia national movie theatre at the same year.

Between 2015 and 2021, she taught at the University of Theatre and Film Arts, and from 2020 she has been a lecturer and doctoral candidate at the Moholy-Nagy University of Art and Design, where she had also continued her doctoral studies. Since 2021, she has been an assistant professor in the set design department at the University of Theatre and Film Arts.

She is one of founders of Csopaki Művésztelep, the Hungarian young talents art camp.

== Awards ==
- 2004 International Antismoking Festival, Athens, Greece (First prize)
- 2005 Touches of the Reneissance workshop, Florence, Italy (First prize)
- 2006 Erasmus Scholarship
- 2006 French Night of Art, Corsica (First prize)
- 2007 Hungarian Red Cross
- 2007 KDB Bank Tender
- 2007 Ferrari tender, Torino, Italy (Public Award, Shell Award)
- 2007 Chocolate packaging competition, Hungary (First prize)
- 2008 Budapest Art Expo, MûvészetMalom, Szentendre, Hungary (Genezis short film)
- 2009 Designer of the week Award, QuarkXPress
- 2010 HSC Golden-Eye Award nomination, Budapest (Pre short film)
- 2012 Women of Excellence Award 2012 nomination, American Chamber of Commerce in Hungary, Budapest

== Filmography ==
=== As a director ===
- Hungarian Red Cross TVspot (2007)
- Modell (2007, documentary film)
- Genezis (2007, short film)
- Market Zrt. (2008, promotion film)
- Engem nem lehet szeretni (2009, music video (Magna Cum Laude))
- Felnőttek Mind (2009, short film)
- Forest (2010, short film)
- Kelen (2011, short film)
- Flashmob project (2012)
- Baska magyarul beszél (2023, documentary film)

=== As a cinematographer ===
- 8 (2007, short film)
- Óperenciám (2008, short film)
- Market Zrt. (2008, promotion film)
- Engem nem lehet szeretni (2009, music video (Magna Cum Laude))
- Well Under the Sun (2010, short film)
- Forest (2010, short film)
- Pluszminusz (2010, short film)
- PRE (2010, short film (Golden-Eye Award nomination))
- Kút a nap alatt (2010, short film)
- Kelen (2011, short film)
- Café Kör (2011, short film
