= Paul Alexander Nyiri =

Hungarian opera singer (1903–1981)

Paul Alexander Nyiri (Hungarian: Nyíri Pál Sándor; * 7 September 1903 in Budapest; † 8 September 1981]in Budapest) was a Hungarian opera singer.

== Life and career ==
Nyiri was an ensemble member of the Reichenberg Opera in the late 1920s. As Figaro in The Marriage of Figaro he gave a guest performance in Budapest in December 1928. In June 1929, he sang Mephisto in Gounod's Faust at the opera house in Budapest. In July 1929, he appeared at the Deutsche Theater in Prague in the title role in The Barber of Bagdad.

From 1932 on he took over the bass part in the vocal ensemble Kardosch-Singers, founded in Berlin by Hungarian István Kardos. The group recorded songs accompanied by Kardos on the piano, as well as with some of the most popular orchestras of the time. They were engaged for the Theater am Kurfürstendamm in Berlin for six months, and toured and performed extensively throughout Germany, the Netherlands and Denmark, as well as appearing on the radio frequently. Additionally, they contributed songs to a number of films. In the movie Roman einer Nacht the group visibly appears in a ball scene.

In May 1935, he married the German dancer Anna Jeannette Weiss, who worked in Max Reinhardt's troupe.

The Kardosch Singers disbanded in November 1935. Both István Kardos and Anna Jeannette Nyíri were classified as Jewish under the Nuremberg Laws, so Kardos and Nyíri eventually returned to Hungary.

After World War II, Nyíri attempted to return to classical singing and gave concerts in Budapest. In November 1946 he sang Schumann's song cycle Dichterliebe and was accompanied by the former and future director of the Hungarian State Opera, Lukács Miklós. In 1947, Nyíri became a government official, then in 1952 a soloist in the Hungarian People's Army Ensemble. In 1956, he took part in the concert tour of the ensemble in the People's Republic of China. After 1956, he was commercial counsellor at the Hungarian Embassies in Jakarta and Karachi, then head of department at the Hungarian Government's Institute of Cultural Relations (KKI), where his responsibilities included organising visits to Hungary by Western writers and artists such as John Steinbeck, Edward Albee, and Benjamin Britten.

Through the 1960s and 1970s Nyíri frequently appeared on Hungarian radio, mostly performing Lieder by Franz Schubert and Ernst von Dohnányi. He also occasionally performed in operas (for example as Sarastro in The Magic Flute) at the festivals in Szeged and Szombathely. In 1964 he gave a recital of songs by Liszt, Debussy, Kodály and Hugo Wolf, accompanied by pianist Emmi Varasdy and guitarist Laszlo Szendrey-Karper. In 1966 he completed a three-week concert tour of Mongolia with opera singer Margit Ercse and Emmi Varasdy, and in 1967 there were performances as a soloist with the Central Choir of the Hungarian-Soviet Friendship Society in Moscow and Kiev. In August of that year, 1967, he performed as the old priest in The Magic Flute at the Iseum-Festival in Szombathely.

As part of her compensation from the West-German government, Anna Jeannette Nyíri was given back her German citizenship, and she and her husband spent time in West-Berlin on a regular basis in the late 1960s and 1970. At a performance of Handel's Messias in West Berlin, Nyíri performed under the stage name Alexander Neri.

== Family ==
Physicist Júlia Nyíri and philosopher J. C. Nyíri are Nyíri's children. Anthropologist Pál Nyíri is his grandson.

== Literature ==
- Deutsches Bühnen-Jahrbuch: Theatergeschichtliches Jahr- und Addressenbuch. Druck und Kommissionverlag F.A. Günther & Sohn, Berlin 1930, p. 311 (in German)
- Josef Westner: Was hältst Du von Veronika? Von den Abels zu den Kardosch-Sängern. In: Der Schalltrichter. Volume 33, September 2008 (in German)
