= Yvonne Noble =

American literary scholar (born 1935)

- Born: February 6, 1935 (age 91); Pittsburgh, Pennsylvania, U.S.
- Occupations: Literary scholar; editor
- Awards: Guggenheim Fellowship (1970)

Academic background
- Education: Colby College (BA); Yale University (MA, PhD)

Academic work
- Institutions: University of Pennsylvania; University of Illinois

Yvonne Noble (born February 6, 1935) is an American literary scholar and editor. A 1970 Guggenheim Fellow, she edited two books on The Beggar's Opera, as well as a volume of Benjamin Franklin's Poor Richard's Almanack annual issues. She was a professor at University of Pennsylvania and University of Illinois and a co-founder of the Women's Studies Group 1558–1837.

== Biography ==
Yvonne Noble was born on February 6, 1935, in Pittsburgh. She obtained her BA from Colby College in 1956, before starting her graduate studies at Yale University.

After obtaining her MA in 1957, Noble worked at the Yale University Library as an editorial assistant for The Papers of Benjamin Franklin from 1957 to 1958, as well as a research assistant at Library Company of Philadelphia (1959–1960). She was the editor of a 1964 volume of Franklin's Poor Richard's Almanack annual issues, as well as a subsequent second edition published in 1965. She eventually obtained her PhD in 1966.

Noble originally worked at the University of Pennsylvania as an English instructor starting in 1962, before being promoted to assistant professor in 1966. In 1967, she moved to the University of Illinois as assistant professor of English, and she was promoted to associate professor in 1970.

Noble was editor of John Gay: The Beggar's Opera (1966). In 1970, she was awarded a Guggenheim Fellowship "for a study of the imaginative influence of Paradise Lost upon certain major 18th century writers". She also co-founded the Women's Studies Group 1558–1837. She later edited another volume on The Beggar's Opera, Twentieth Century Interpretations of The Beggar's Opera: A Collection of Critical Essays, which was published by Prentice Hall in 1975. She was a member of the Modern Language Association.

Originally a native of "a small town [...] four miles from Clairton, Pennsylvania", she later moved to England with her husband and two children.
