= Mordechai Efraim Fischel Sofer-Zussman =

Hungarian rabbi

Mordechai Efraim Fischel Sofer-Zussman (1867–1942) was a Hungarian rabbi who served as the chief rabbi of Budapest.

Sofer-Zussman's father was Benjamin Zev Wolf Sofer-Zussman, a rabbi in Budapest and the author of Chalifot Simlat Binyamin. Modecai Sofer-Zussman married the daughter of Kopel Reich, Chief Rabbi of Budapest.

After becoming a rabbi, Sofer-Zussman served in several communities before becoming the head of the Yere'im Community. In 1914, he was appointed chief rabbi of Hungary to succeed Kopel Reich.. Sofer-Zussman wrote a commentary on the Pentateuch called Ateret Paz, which was published in Jerusalem (1967).
