= Gyorgy Bp. Szabo =

Hungarian designer and musician (born 1953)

Gyorgy Bp. Szabo (born September 30, 1953 in Budapest) is a Hungarian designer and musician.

== Education ==
In 1982, Gyorgy Bp. Szabo received his MFA from the Moholy-Nagy University of Art and Design in Budapest. He then got his Masters in Typography. His professors included Sandor Ernyei, Janos Kass, Peter Viragvolgyi and the legendary Ernő Rubik, the inventor of the Rubik's Cube. As a graphic designer he designed posters, mostly representing alternative bands.

== Career ==
In 1992, Szabo became the co-owner of A.R.C. Studio, and in 1994, he started his own graphic design company called Bp. Studio. In 1996, he moved to Los Angeles to work for the well-known animation company Klasky Csupo where he became an art director. In 2004, he worked for Crew Creative, and finally landed the position of Creative Director at Cleopatra Records. His art reflects the way music and art collide. From 1983, his band Bp. Service has reflected the sound of accidental noise discoveries, machines, and the sound of the city along with self-made generators, resulting in uniquely innovative music. His art reflects the pulse of city life; an expression of the rhythms of post modern recycled urban street art, balancing atmospheric dreams and ambient reality. These creations reflect an eco-friendly way to recreate disposed objects into art pieces that are, in essence, a collection of junk.

== Important exhibitions ==
=== Own exhibitions ===
- 2020 – Exhibition, Tér-Kép Gallery, Budapest
- 2016 – Mű[talált]tárgyak, Liget Gallery, Budapest
- 2014 – Double Sans, Erlin Gallery, Budapest
- 2013 – Elllenkultura a 80-as evekben, BTM, Budapest Gallery, Budapest
- 2010 – Budapest-Los Angeles 1995-2010 Budapest Gallery. Budapest
- 2003 – Elements, Klasky Csupo Gallery, Los Angeles
- 2001 – Collections, Klasky Csupo Gallery, Los Angeles
- 1995 – Conserved Soundprints, Kunst Halle, Budapest
- 1994 – Deep Signals Skrached by Crystal, Mu terem Gallery, Budapest
- 1993 – Soundprint, Young Artist Club, Budapest
- 1988 – Radiating Devices, Young Artist Club, Budapest
- 1987 – URBANCONCERTPOSTERS, Liget Galeria, Budapest
- 1987 – Radiating Devices, Fenyes Adolf Terem, Budapest
- 1987 – Ferencvarosi Pincetarlat, Budapest

=== Group exhibitions ===
- 2022 – Smaller Worlds, Ludwig Museum, Budapest
- 2020 – Unicef LuppArt, Brody House, Budapest
- 2020 – Szentendre's Plein Air Exhibition, Róma
- 2019 – Bestiárium, Rugógyár Galéria, Budapest
- 2018 – Talált Pixelek, Ferenczy Múzeum Barcsay terme, Szentendre
- 2017 – Pokoli Aranykor, Kieselbach Galéria, Budapest
- 2017 – Ihlet, Vajda Lajos Stúdió, Szentendre
- 2017 – AntiHangszer kiállítás, Vajda Lajos Stúdió, Szentendre
- 2017 – 100 Éves a Dada, Vajda Lajos Stúdió, Szentendre
- 2017 – Dobozterek, Magán(y)gyűjtemények, D17 Galéria, Budapest
- 2016 – Akkumulátor, Budapest Galéria, Budapest
- 2016 – Making Music Modern: Design for Ear and Eye, MoMA, New York
- 2015 – Fény, Nádor Galéria, Budapest
- 2014 – Art Show and Performance, gGallery Galéria, Los Angeles
- 2014 – Art Show and Performance, gGallery Galéria, Los Angeles
- 2014 – Studiofive08 Gallery, Los Angeles
- 2014 – Art Show & Performance, gGallery, Los Angeles
- 2013 – Art Show & Performance, The Hive Gallery, Los Angeles
- 2013 – Art Show & Performance, gGallery, Los Angeles
- 2013 – Encore: Angel, 2nd Friday Art@TCSB, Santa Barbara
- 2013 – Studiofive08 Gallery, Los Angeles
- 2012 – Bull Show, 2nd Friday Art@TCSB, Santa Barbara
- 2012 – Art Show & Performance, gGallery, Los Angeles
- 2012 – Art Show & Performance, The Hive Gallery, Los Angeles
- 2011 – Seeing through the eyes of the Mona Lisa, Arena 1 Gallery, Los Angeles
- 2011 – Art Show & Performance, Hive Gallery, Los Angeles
- 2010 – Art Show & Performance, The Hive Gallery, Los Angeles
- 2010 – Art Show, Cannibal Flower Art Gallery, Los Angeles
- 2009 – Art Show & Performance, The Hive Gallery, Los Angeles
- 2008 – Art Show, Cannibal Flower Art Gallery, Los Angeles
- 2008 – Art Show & Performance, The Hive Gallery, Los Angeles
- 2005 – Art Regained, Art Pool, P60, Budapest,
- 2001 - International Hanger Show, Hungarian Consulate, New York
- 2001 - International Hanger Show, 2B Gallery, Budapest
- 1997 – Lumpy Gravy, Art Bistro and Gallery, Los Angeles
- 1996 – Studio of Lajos Vajda, Szentendre
- 1994 – Mirelite City, Tilos az A, Budapest
- 1993 –Late Naive, Conserved Soundprint 5, Jatekszín, Budapest
- 1992 – Polypoezis, Hungarian-Italian Culture Academy
- 1991 – Test-ek, Budapest Gallery, Budapest
- 1991 – Noise Installation, fare well to Budapest
- 1990 – The Signs of Change, posters 1988–1990, Hungarian National Gallery, Budapest
- 1988 – Mechanical, Radnoti Stage
- 1987 – Stamp Pictures, Museum on Fine Arts, Budapest
- 1987 – Sound Therapy and Sound Maneuvers, Pinceszinhaz, Budapest
- 1986 – Yellow Exhibition, Young Artist Club, Budapest
- 1985 – Art Nouveau and New Wave, Rome
- 1985 – Ferencvarosi, Pincetarlat, Budapest
- 1985 – Soundprints, Fényes Adolf Terem, Budapest
- 1985 – Studio of your Artists Exhibition, Ernst Múzeum, Budapest
- 1984 – Hungary Could be Yours, Young Artist Club, Budapest
- 1983 – Today's Hungarian Graphics and Art, The Hungarian National Gallery, Budapest
- 1980 – Resume, Young Artist Club, Budapest
- 1980 – Visual Experiments, Moholy-Nagy University Of Art And Design, Budapest
- 1976 – National Graphics, Biennálé, Varsó

== Press ==
- Szkárosi E.: Zajlátvány, Élet és Irodalom, 1995. November 3.
- Bogácsi E.: Zenél az asztallap is. Beszélgetés Bp. Szabó Györggyel, Népszabadság, 1996. január 16.
- Szkárosi E.: Mi az, hogy Avantgárd, Írások az avantgárd hagyománytörténetéből, 2006
- Carolyn Blais: The Hive + Temple of Visions Opening Night – Forth Magazine, January 21, 2010
- Dr. Máriás: A nagyvárosi Lét Vibrációi – A38, December 2010
- Eszter Götz: Szemétköltészet - Bp. Szabó György, December 4, 2010
- Judit Gellér: Out Of Use – Bp. Szabó György, 2010
- Dr.Máriás: Gyémántok a klotyóból – Élet és Irodalom, January 7, 2011
- D. Udvary Ildikó: Találatok - Egyenlítő, April 20, 2011
- Pallag Zoltán: Tűrt trash, tiltott trash, támogatott trash, Új Művészet, 2013

== Concerts/Shows ==
- 1997 – Electronic Noise Theater, Roxy Club, Los Angeles
- 1996 – Impala Cafe Presents, Electric Thursday, Los Angeles
- 1997 – Sneak-Preview Open House, Los Angeles
- 1997 – Electronic Noise & Soundscape, Lumpy Gravy, Los Angeles
- 1995 – Conserved Soundprint, Kunst Halle, Budapest
- 1995 – Skulpture Hall of Kunst Halle, Budapest
- 1995 – Noise Theater 3, MU Theater, Budapest
- 1994 – A is Forbidden, Budapest
- 1994 – Sound Manoeuver, Dalmat Basement, Szentedre
- 1994 – Noise Theater 2, MU Theater, Budapest
- 1993 – Noise Theater 1, MU Theater, Budapest
- 1993 – Late Naive, Conserved Soundprint 5, Játékszín, Budapent
- 1993 – Needs Solve, Conserved Soundprints 3, Pecs
- 1993 – Soundprint, Young Artist Club, Budapest
- 1992 – Polypoezis, Italian-Hungarian Club, Budapest
- 1992 – Concert In the Factory, Pecs
- 1992 – New Ladyrunner- Soundpoetry, Szentendre
- 1990 – Black Hole, Budapest
- 1990 – MU Theater, Budapest
- 1989 – Weekend Expansion, Greek Temple, Vac
- 1989 – MU Theater, Budapest
- 1989 – Independent, Obuda Theatre, Budapest
- 1989 – Europakolo- Nightmare Tour, University Stage, Budapest
- 1989 – Solidart- Mimifest, Young Artists Club, Budapest
- 1989 – Live Techno Pop Fest, Young Artists Club, Budapest
- 1988 – Soundrays, Fényes Adolf Room, Budapest
- 1988 – Alternative Club, Budapest
- 1987 – Bp. Service, Concert at the Cave, Szentendre
- 1986 – Almasi Ter, Free Time Center, Budapest
- 1985 – Exhibition Band, Bercsenyi, Budapest
- 1985 – Light Map, Petofi Hall, Budapest
- 1985 – Cave Concert, Szentendre
- 1985 – City After Shock Light Speed in the Shadow, Kassak Club, Budapest
- 1984 – INKASZAMTAN University Stage, Budapest
- 1984 – A platinum 84 Division C festival, Budapest
- 1984 – Rigid Music Fest 5., Egyetemi Színpad, Budapest
- 1984 – Noise Therapy and Sound Maneuver, Basement Theatre, Budapest
- 1983 – Electric Petting, Budapest Culture Club, Budapest
- 1983 – Underground Night, Kozgaz Club

== Other Released Sound Material ==
- 1985 – Enervated Tiny Draughts
- 1988 – Post Vibration of a City in the Shadow of Lightwaves
- 1990 – Bp. Service
- 1990 – Solidart-Minifest, Industrial Alpinist
- 1993 – Noise
- 1995 – The Machines Print Soundmaps
- 1997 – Deep Signal
- 1998 – Self Acting Technology
- 2005 – Plastic Alligator / Gyorgy Bp. szabo
