= Zoltan Vancso =

Hungarian photographer, photo reporter (born 1972)

Zoltán Vancsó
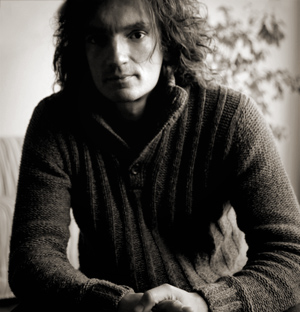
- Zoltan Vancso in 2011
- Born: Vancsó Zoltán; 29 October 1972 (age 53); Budapest, Hungary
- Occupation: Photo journalist
- Notable work: Silent Stills (2002) Twincity, Budapest–Paris (2006) Still Movies (1995–2007) Unintended Light (2008) Between Nothingness and Eternity (2010)
- Awards: Balogh Rudolf Award (2002)
- Website: www.zoltan.pictures

Zoltan Vancso (born 29 October 1972, in Budapest) is a Hungarian photographer and photojournalist. Primarily renowned for his black and white photography, he currently photographs in color, reflecting explicit and deliberate concepts.

His work has been characterized by a peculiar "Vancsonesque" perspective: opting for formally simple solutions but nonetheless creating an inexhaustible world through his pictures. "It is not allowed to either write of, think of or associate the photos of Zoltan Vancso with anything. These pictures are objects of meditation." Peter Mueller, writer. "Zoltan Vancso cultivates photography philosophically, and saying this is the greatest compliment, the deepest form of appreciation on my part." (Peter Dobai, writer, dramaturge)

== Life and work ==
Zoltan Vancso was born in 1972 in Budapest. His elementary school art teacher, Ferenc Varga started him off in the world of pictures; he got enamored of motion picture as a cameraman for school television. In 1991 he was accepted to the photographer specialty class in the No. 6 Vocational School (Prater Street, Budapest). Meanwhile, he achieved great success as a student filmmaker in Valencia, Mondavio and Budapest. He tried to gain acceptance into the photography major of the College of Industrial Arts several times but due to his feeble talent for drawing his application was denied; in 2006 he also unsuccessfully applied to the cameraman specialty of the University of Film Arts. From 1993 to 2005 he worked as a photo reporter for the weekly "168 hours". Between 2002 and 2012 he was a teacher at the Camera Anima Open Academy, between 2008 and 2009, he was the photography editor and photo columnist of news portal "zoom.hu". Since 2009, he works as a freelance photographer and he holds lectures at several photography schools.

Vancso takes part in the activities of several professional organizations: 1996–2006 in Studio of Young Photographers Hungary (FFS); since 2004, in Young Photographers United (YPU); since 2002, in the Association of Hungarian Photographers, here he worked with the board of directors for two years; since 2005, in the National Association of Hungarian Artists (MAOE).

== Photographic oeuvre ==
Between 1998 and 2008 he has won the Pecsi Jozsef Photography Scholarship several times, in 2002 he won the Hungart Scholarship, in 2003 he was awarded the Balogh Rudolf Award. In 2004 he spent two months in Paris under the Andre Kertesz Scholarship. He has won the creative scholarship of the National Cultural Fund four times. His first slideshow completed in 2005, Ocean of Sighs – Cuba, was the first in the history of photography to gain entry to national film distribution: it was screened with great success before Wim Wenders' Don't Come Knocking in movie theatres. In 2006 he won the creative scholarship of the National Association of Hungarian Artists (MAOE). In 2010 he was awarded the title Photographer of the Year by Foto- Video Magazine due to achieving first place in the EISA Maestro Photo Competition. In 2011, he won a professional and an audience award at the international photo book tender of Blurb, the leader of on-demand photo book publishing (Photography Book Now 2011). He received a month-long scholarship in Lisbon as part of the Budapest Gallery international residency program.

Vancso presents his work to the public from time to time in a purposeful and exigent manner; between 1995 and 2014 he participated in 50 individual and more than 20 group exhibitions, mostly in Hungarian galleries. From 2002 to 2015, 14 of his individual photo albums have been published.

The year 2012 brought a turning point in his professional life, since then he believes more strongly in the power of movie screenings than in traditional photography exhibitions. In the fall of 2012 he presented the first Hungarian feature-length photo-movie (slideshow) in the distribution of Budapest Film entitled Landslides – Discovering the void, which was screened with great success across the theatres of the Art movie network in Budapest. Encouraged by the excellent reception, he held two completely sold out retrospective independent slideshow evenings entitled Vancso! Live, then in November he made the presentation of his two new photo albums memorable, again by using movie screenings. In April 2014 he organized an all-day series of screenings called "Photovancso-Marathon"; in the same year he made his debut at the Month of Photography 2014 festival with 5 independent slideshow evenings. His name is linked with the first Hungarian 4K Ultra HD slideshow movie screening.

Zoltan Vancso sets out to capture mundane, undirected moments that practically demand to have mysterious stories invented about them. He creates context where there were previously none and by this, even coincidence is impregnated with meaning. Looking at his pictures, we tread through improbable lands; strange, inexplicable things happen to us. These are subjective landscapes, which only open up if we pay close attention to ourselves and the world." (Tibor Miltenyi, aesthete)

His works have binds to the old school of photography, of course this doesn't mean anachronism, reminiscence, or a die-hard, antiquated approach, but the simple fact that he sticks to the representational, perpetuating (trivial) aspect of his device, photography. He directs his camera toward the world which seems inexhaustibly interesting with remarkable humility, patience and sensitivity. He has no intentions of altering either the spectacle or the picture created of it by applying methods foreign to the original, fundamental nature of photography. His art does not feed on such "added values" but on framing particular segments of space and time out of an infinite number of occurrences in the world, which hold a meaning outside their mere existence for him and for others and he does so with his own specific approach. Framing is, of course, carried out with the original and confident use of photographic devices, by applying the strictly "Vancsonesque" viewpoint, cuts, compositions and tones.

— Klara Szarka – technical writer

I had worked for the press for twelve years (...) so I developed two different photographer personas. One seeks to portray reality in the most straightforward, comprehensible manner but the other acts on the contrary; it thrives on the improbability of reality and on the fact that this can be mediated through photography, a theoretically objective device.

— Zoltan Vancso

Vancso's connection with his patrons and audiences has resulted in the formation relatively large Facebook community with over 11,000 members, where he publishes his works on a weekly basis. As part of the annual Photovancso Open Day, he has also welcomed visitors in his own home.

In the end of 2010, he was the first Hungarian photographer to create a web shop where he made all his notable works available to the public in unnumbered copies.

I’d prefer if the value of a print wasn't determined by the number of copies made but by the number of people who like it, the number of people it evokes feelings from. Similarly to a musician who doesn't limit the copies of his work that he wants to share with the world. He doesn't declare that his CD only exists in 10, 50 or 200 copies thus making it very valuable. I’d like to make my photographs as widely available, purchasable as possible. I never really understood why the majority of artists still insist on the existence of their works in the fewest copies and on the highest prices in case of an art technique so easily reproducible as photography. This is even more shocking in today's digital world! It's important to me that interested parties with an average income should be able to buy my photographs, not only wealthy collectors who consider them rather as an investment than a subject of enthusiasm.

— Zoltan Vancso

His other passion is music. In parallel with photography, he completed a course in sound engineering and used to spend his free time playing the piano, composing. In the last few years, finding his spiritual path became an important aspect of his life besides photography; he often goes hiking to forests and practices yoga and zazen regularly.

== Published albums ==
- 2014 The Sleep of Reason (Artphoto Gallery, Budapest)
- 2013 Landslides – Exploring the void (author's edition)
- 2013 Between nothingness and eternity (author's edition)
- 2011 Unintended Light (author's edition)
- 2011 One Week of Wandering in China
- 2011 The Sleep of Reason
- 2011 Only the Clouds Remain
- 2010 Between nothingness and eternity
- 2010 Big Bang
- 2010 Proximate Infinity
- 2009 Mysterious Traveler
- 2008 Still Movies – retrospective album (author's edition)
- 2006 Twincity/Budapest-Paris (author's edition)
- 2004 Down with the Fisherman's Bastille! Photo album of Budapest (Gabo Publishing House)
- 2004 Pilgrims (author's edition)
- 2002 Silent Stills (author's edition)

== Slideshow Evenings ==
- 2014 Photovancso Slideshow Evenings – 5 full-length performances (1. Still Movies, 2. Unintended Light, 3. Between nothingness and eternity, 4. Landslides – Exploring the void, 5. Vancso-World/The Peter Gabriel Slideshow) EuroCenter Cinema, Budapest
- 2014 Photovancso-Marathon, EuroCenter Cinema, Budapest
- 2013 Vancso!Live 2.0 – double book launch and slideshow evening, EuroCenter Cinema, Budapest
- 2013 Landslides – photo-concert with the Bajdazo band, MOM Cultural Centre, Budapest
- 2013 Vancso!Live – slideshow evening, EuroCenter Cinema, Budapest

== Solo exhibitions ==
- 2014 Landslides – Exploring the void, Artmill Modern And Contemporary Art Centre, Szentendre
- 2014 The Sleep of Reason, Artphoto Gallery, Budapest
- 2014 Sanctity and Creation, Fono Music Hall, Budapest
- 2014 Landslides – Exploring the void, Budapest Centre of Architecture, Budapest
- 2012 X6 Gallery, Budapest
- 2012 Landslides – Exploring the void, feature-length photo movie screened across Budapest Art movies
- 2011 International Meetings of Photography, Plovdiv, Bulgaria
- 2010 Unintended Light, Central European House of Photography, Bratislava
- 2010 Unintended Light, Hungarian House of Photography, Budapest
- 2009 Unintended Light, Abbey of Pannonhalma
- 2009 Twincity, Hungarian Institute, Paris
- 2008 Still Movies – retrospective exhibition, Budapest Gallery
- 2008 A Hidden Diary's Discovered Photos, Nessim Gallery, Budapest
- 2008 Per la fotografia, Jesi, Italy
- 2006 Twincity, French Institute, Budapest, Hungarian Institute, Brussels
- 2006 Once upon a time..., House of Future, Budapest
- 2006 Open Workshop, Budapest
- 2006 Cloudbusting, Mives Glass Studio, Budapest
- 2006 Museum of Moments, Menta Terasz, Budapest
- 2005 Ocean of Sighs – Cuba, House of Dialog, Budapest
- 2005 Silent Stills, Tranzit Art Cafe, Budapest
- 2004 Pilgrims, MVM Gallery, Budapest
- 2004 Down with the Fisherman's Bastille! – with William Klein, MEO, Budapest
- 2003 Colored pictures, Hajos Gallery, Budapest
- 2003 Silent Stills, Ericsson Gallery, Budapest
- 2003 Photo Month, Pecs, Hungary
- 2002 Kempinski Gallery, Budapest
- 2002 Silent Stills | French Institute, Budapest
- 2001 Morocco | Vista Gallery, Budapest
- 2000 Australia | Vista gallery, Budapest
- 2000 Ferencvaros Gallery, Budapest
- 2000 Magma Gallery, Budapest
- 1999 Accademia d'Ungheria, Rome, Italy
- 1998 Tolgyfa Gallery, Budapest
- 1997 Community Centre, Nyiregyhaza, Hungary
- 1997 Miskolc Gallery, Miskolc, Hungary
- 1997 Nowhere – with Lenke Szilagyi, French Institute, Budapest
- 1996 Cinema cirkogejzir, Budapest
- 1995 Gallery 11, Budapest
- 1995 Ret Gallery, Budapest

== Group exhibitions ==
- 2014 National Cultural Fund of Hungary – Art exhibition, Varkert Bazaar, Budapest
- 2012 Progressive Experiments 1977–2012, Hungarian Museum of Photography, Kecskemet
- 2012 Telemetric, photographic works and vision systems from the past 50 years, Kepes Institute, Eger
- 2011 Budapest Positive, Hungarian House of Photography
- 2010 Labor Ost, Zurich, Switzerland
- 2009 International Photographic Festival, Lishui, China
- 2009 Fenyeles | Hungarian House of Photography, Budapest
- 2009 Tradition and Receptiveness – Current Developments in Hungarian Photography | Tallinn | Helsinki
- 2009 AK 12, Balassi Institute, Budapest, Hungarian Institute, Paris, Brussels, Bratislava
- 2008 Pulsation, Contemporary Fine Art Exhibition, Szada, Hungary
- 2008 100 Faces of Transylvania, Budapest
- 2004 Dokk – Documentarist Photography Exhibition, Moscow, Russia
- 2004 Press Photo Exhibition, Budapest
- 2003 One day in Budapest, Millenaris Garden, Budapest
- 2002 Dokk, Maghaz, Budapest
- 2002 Panoramic Photographs, Biennial Photofestival, Esztergom, Hungary
- 2001 Photo Salon, Kunsthalle, Budapest
- 2001 Animal Show, Fotogalerie Wien, Vienna, Austria
- 2000 ARC Poster Exhibition, Budapest
- 2000 Exhibition of the winners of the Pecsi Jozsef Scholarship, Hungarian House of Photography, Budapest
- 1995 Photo Month, Bratislava, Slovakia
- 1995 National Photo Biennale, Ernst Museum, Budapest
- 1993 Hungarian Photography, Vigado Gallery, Budapest

== Awards ==
- 2012, 2013 Whumm! Photo book contest – grand prize
- 2011 Blurb Photography Book Now – audience award in Fine Art category
- 2011 Blurb Photography Book Now – 3rd place in Travel category
- 2010 EISA Maestro Photo Content – award-winner in Hungary
- 2008 Panasonic – Lumix – award-winner
- 2004 Press Photo Exhibition, Budapest – honorable mention
- 2004 Andre Kertesz Scholarship
- 2003 Rudolf Balogh Prize
- 2002 Budapest Photography Scholarship
- 2001 Hungart Scholarship
- 2000 Kodak Professional Award (II. National Photo Month)
- 1998–2003 Pecsi Jozsef Scholarship
- 1994, 1999 Nikon Photo Contest Int. – honorable mention

== Publications ==
- 2014/77 Enigma art theory journal (The Valley of the Shadow of Death by Csilla Markoja)
- 2011 Unpublished Magazine, Issue 02
- 2010/Nov Visual Masters Magazine
- 2010 LabEast, 25 photographic positions from Central and Eastern Europe
- 2010/6 Carne Mag, Visual Arts Magazin
- 2010/Sept Fan The Fire Magazine
- 2010/I Fotomuveszet, Hungary
- 2009/12 Fotomozaik, Hungary
- 2007/autumn Foto Video, Hungary
- 2005 Ocean of Sighs – Cuba, photo movie in Hungarian cinemas before Wenders' Don't Come Knocking
- 2005/autumn Anda Magazin, Hungary
- 2005/March Fotomagazin, Moscow, Russia
- 2004/1-2 Fotoriporter, Hungary
- 2003/autumn PS Zwack Magazin, Hungary
- 2002 Dokk – Documentarist Photography (photoalbum), Hungary
- 2002/10 Foto Video, Hungary
- 2001 Regard Hongrois, Mai Mano Haz, Hungary
- 2000/3-4 Fotomuveszet, Hungary
- 1997/8 Fotografia, Hungary
- 1993–2005 Szellemkep Magazine, Hungary

== Sources ==
- Zoltan Vancso’s official website
- On the homepage of Photographers in Hungary Foundation
- Artportal
- Zoltan Vancso’s official Facebook page
- Tibor Miltenyi: The Poetry of Nothing (Bohony Publishing House)
