= Yvonne T. Lanni =

Italian-born molecular biologist

- Born: Yvonne Théry; 18 January 1921; Italy
- Occupation: Biologist
- Spouse: Frank Lanni
- Awards: Guggenheim Fellowship (1970)

Academic background
- Education: Federal University of Rio de Janeiro

Academic work
- Discipline: Microbiology
- Institutions: Emory University; University of Texas at Dallas

Yvonne Théry Lanni (born 18 January 1921) was an Italian-born microbiologist. A 1970 Guggenheim Fellow, she obtained her medical degree in Brazil and worked as a professor at Emory University and the University of Texas at Dallas.

== Biography ==
Yvonne Théry was born on 18 January 1921 in Italy. She studied in both France and Brazil, and obtained her MD at the Federal University of Rio de Janeiro's Faculty of Medicine in 1946. After serving as a 1948-1949 American Red Cross Fellow, she worked as a researcher at Duke University (1949-1950) and Instituto Oswaldo Cruz (1950-1951).

She worked as a research assistant at University of Illinois (1951–53) and as a research associate at University of Illinois Chicago (1953–54). In 1954, she moved to Emory University and became instructor in bacteriology. She was promoted to assistant professor of bacteriology and immunology in June 1960, before receiving another promotion to associate professor in 1966. In 1967, she joined the University of Texas at Dallas as an associate professor in biology.

In 1952, she and her husband used egg whites and the blood cells of chicks to study a potential cure for influenza. In 1957, she and her husband were awarded a United States Public Health Service grant to study viral replication. In 1970, she was awarded a Guggenheim Fellowship for "experimental studies in molecular biology". She published articles in Archives of Biochemistry, Bacteriological Reviews, Cold Spring Harbor Symposia on Quantitative Biology, Journal of Bacteriology, Journal of Immunology, Journal of Molecular Biology, Memórias do Instituto Oswaldo Cruz, Proceedings of the Society for Experimental Biology and Medicine and Virology, as well as in the Proceedings of the National Academy of Sciences and Science.

She married Frank Lanni, who was also a bacteriology-immunology professor at Emory; the two had met while she was at Duke.
