= Aquincum Museum =

Museum in Budapest, Hungary

Coordinates: 47°33′56.27″N 19°2′59.34″E

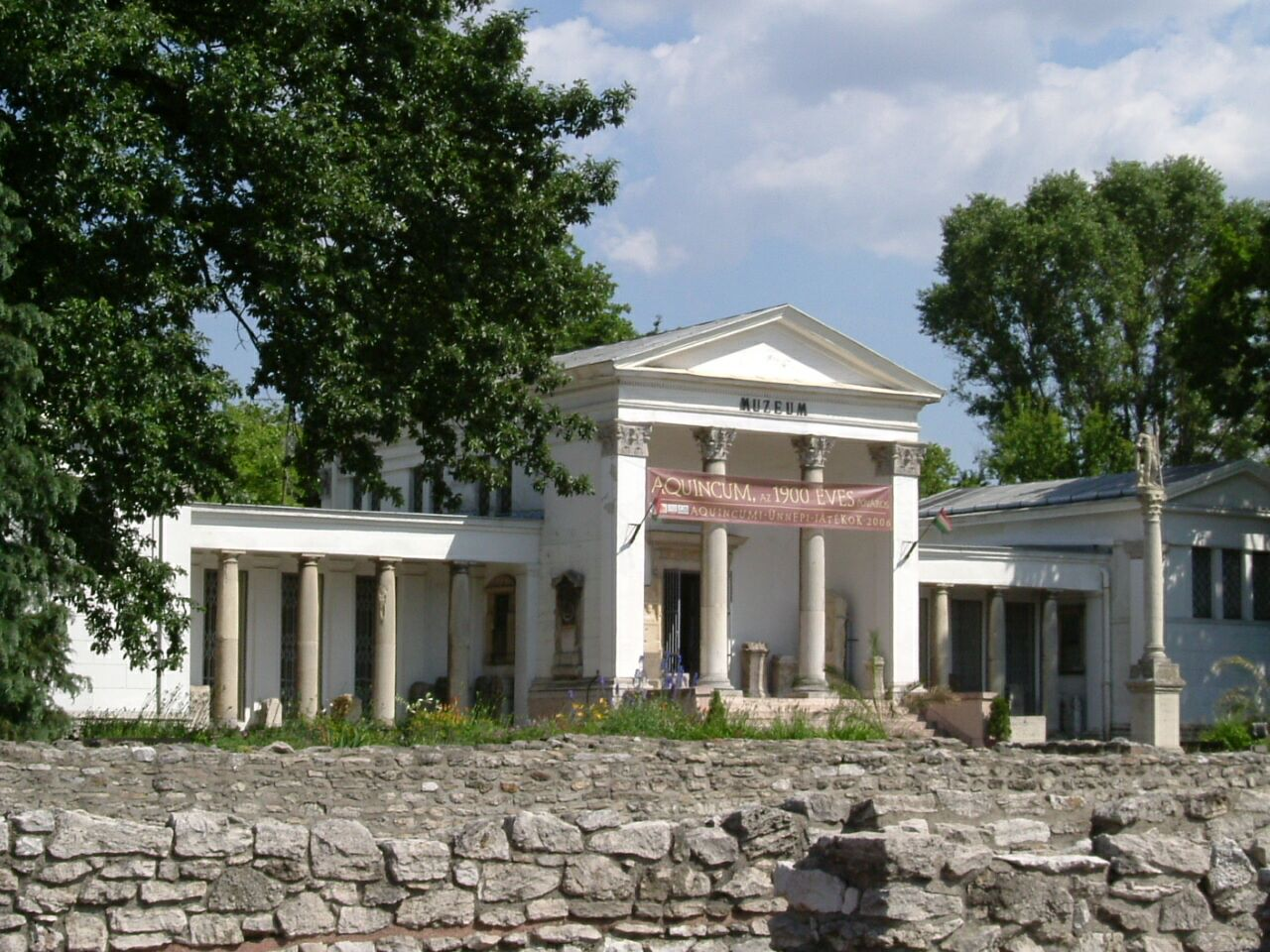
Aquincum Museum

The Aquincum Museum is a museum in Budapest, Hungary. It opened on 10 May 1894. Archeological findings from the remains of Aquincum are on display there. These include items from the local mithraeum. It has an indoor and outdoor part.

The museum belongs to the Budapest History Museum and holds more than a million objects. Its archaeological park covers part of the Roman civil town of Aquincum, with a reconstructed Roman house, the House of the Painter, and a reconstructed temple of Mithras. The original museum building is neoclassical.

Its best-known object is the water organ of Aquincum, discovered by the archaeologist Lajos Nagy. Bronze plates found with it record that it was given to the town's fire brigade in AD 228, and it is the only Roman water organ known to survive. In 2024 the museum marked its 130th anniversary with the exhibition Aquincum 130 on the history of the museum and its finds.

Paula Zsidi served as the museum director from 1989 until 2015.
