= Susi Koref-Santibañez =

Chilean geneticist (born 1930)

- Born: 24 April 1930; Santiago, Chile
- Occupation: Geneticist
- Awards: Guggenheim Fellowship (1970)

Academic background
- Education: University of Chile

Academic work
- Discipline: Genetics
- Sub-discipline: Drosophila
- Institutions: University of Chile

Susi Koref-Santibañez (born 24 April 1930) is a Chilean geneticist. She is a 1970 Guggenheim Fellow and has worked at the University of Chile in research and teaching positions.

== Life and career ==
Susi Koref-Santibañez born on 24 April 1930 in Santiago, Chile. She was educated at the University of Chile Faculty of Medicine, where she obtained an MD in 1954.

Having become an assistant in biology at the University of Chile Faculty of Medicine in 1950, she remained in the position after obtaining her MD. She was promoted to research associate in 1966. She also became an associate professor in 1964. She later served as the subrogate director of the university's Department of Genetics and Biology from 1969 to 1970. She earned several grants for her academic research, including from the British Council (1957), the University of Chile (1958–1959); the International Atomic Energy Agency (1966), and the government of Italy (1967).

She was a recurring participant of the International Congress of Genetics, contributing to the Proceedings of the X, XI, and XII congresses of 1958, 1963, and 1968. In 1970, she was awarded a Guggenheim Fellowship "for a study of behavior and population genetics of Drosophila". She revised Akademische Verlagsgesellschaft's 1990 edition of Jean-Baptiste Lamarck's Philosophie zoologique.

In her book Mujeres chilenas, Sonia Montecino cited her as a pioneer in Chile women scientists. In 1993, William R. Rice and Ellen E. Hostert cited her and C. H. Waddington's 1958 article on an experiment of inbreeding of Drosophila melanogaster as an example of sampling drift.
