= Shoichiro Sakai =

Japanese mathematician

Shoichiro Sakai (境 正一郎, Sakai Shōichirō, born 1928 in Kanuma, Tochigi) is a Japanese mathematician.

== Life ==
Sakai studied mathematics at the Tohoku University (Sendai). He there received the B. A. degree in 1953 and a doctorate at the same University in 1961. From 1960 to 1964, he was a faculty member of Waseda University. He then went to the University of Pennsylvania, where he became a professor in 1966 and remained until 1979. He then returned to Japan and went to the Nihon University. In 1992, he received the Japanese Mathematical Society Autumn Prize. He is a fellow of the American Mathematical Society.

Sakai's main field is functional analysis and mathematical physics. His textbook published in the Springer series in C *-algebras and W *-algebras, in which W *-algebras as C *-algebras are introduced with a predual, is widely used. That fact the W *-algebras may be defined in this way is known as a theorem of Sakai (cf. a theorem of Kadison-Sakai.)

== Works ==
- C *-algebras and W *-algebras, Springer-Verlag 1971, Ergebnisse der Mathematik und ihrer Grenzgebiete, Volume 60, ISBN 3-540-63633-1 (republished in 1998 in Classics in Mathematics)
- Operator algebras in dynamical systems, the theory of unbounded derivations in C*-algebras, Cambridge University Press (1991), ISBN 0-521-40096-1
