= Alexander Nadas =

Hungarian-American pediatric cardiologist (1913–2000)

- Born: November 12, 1913; Budapest, then Austria-Hungary
- Died: May 16, 2000 (aged 86); Needham, Massachusetts, U.S.
- Known for: Nadas' Pediatric Cardiology
- Scientific career
- Fields: Pediatric cardiology
- Institutions: Boston Children's Hospital; Harvard Medical School

Alexander Sandor Nadas (November 12, 1913 – May 16, 2000) was a Hungarian-American pediatric cardiologist and Professor of Pediatrics at Harvard Medical School. He founded the cardiology program at Boston Children's Hospital, which was one of the early training programs in pediatric cardiology. Nadas authored an influential textbook, now known as Nadas' Pediatric Cardiology.

== Early life ==
Born in Budapest, Nadas graduated from medical school at Semmelweis University. He spent several months studying in Britain with cardiologist Paul Hamilton Wood and another year studying pathology in Geneva. In December 1938, he arrived in New York and began to study for licensure in the United States. He completed a rotating internship in Cleveland and a pediatric residency under Clement A. Smith in Detroit. He received a second medical degree from Wayne State University.

== Career ==
Nadas spent three years practicing as a pediatrician in Greenfield, Massachusetts. He was dismissed from a Catholic hospital there because he had advocated for counseling married people on the use of contraception. He was invited by Charles Janeway to Boston Children's Hospital. He started one of the early training programs in pediatric cardiology in the early 1950s. Donald Fyler, who became an influential pediatric cardiologist, trained under Nadas. Nadas retired as professor emeritus of pediatrics from Harvard Medical school.

In 1952, Nadas and colleagues published a paper on cardiac complications in cystic fibrosis (CF), correctly predicting that heart failure would become an important issue in CF as antibiotics emerged that would prolong the survival of CF patients. Much of his work focused on the understanding of congenital heart defects. He advanced the science behind electrocardiographic data in pediatrics, and he helped to establish cardiac catheterization and cardiac pathology laboratories at Boston Children's. Nadas attained the rank of Professor of Pediatrics at Harvard Medical School in 1969 and he was awarded a Guggenheim Fellowship in 1970.

Nadas was the author of a textbook, Pediatric Cardiology; later editions of the book are known as Nadas' Pediatric Cardiology. He was a charter member of the American Academy of Pediatrics Section of Cardiology and was the first recipient of The Founders Award, given by that section to individuals who make outstanding contributions to pediatric cardiology or pediatric cardiovascular surgery. In 1977, Nadas delivered the American Heart Association (AHA) Helen B. Taussig Memorial Lecture. In 1986, the AHA established the Alexander Nadas Lecture.

== Personal life ==
Nadas was married to the former Elizabeth McClearen for 53 years; they met when Nadas was in New York. Nadas commented that Elizabeth was "a tall, slender, beautiful, blonde, southern-voiced, American girl – and that is what I wanted. I wanted to distance myself from everything Hungarian, and that was about as far as I could run." They had three children. His daughter Elizabeth (Betsy) Nadas Seamans played Mrs. McFeely on the television show Mister Rogers' Neighborhood. A granddaughter, Ann, died in a car accident when she was in college.

== Later life ==
Nadas retired from Harvard in 1984, and the school established a professorship in his honor. He spent much of his later life caring for his wife, who suffered from severe rheumatoid arthritis for many years. Predeceased by his wife in 1994, Nadas died in 2000 at his home in Needham, Massachusetts. He had been born with a bicuspid aortic valve, suffered from two bouts of endocarditis, and died of congestive heart failure.
