= Paul B. Szanto =

American physician

Paul B. Szanto (1905 in Budapest, Hungary – February 6, 1989 in Chicago, Illinois, United States) was a Hungarian-born Jewish pathologist who spent most of his career in Chicago. Szanto's wartime service was covered in Michael J. Lepore's book Life of the Clinician. Szanto was one of the pioneering researchers at the Hektoen Institute.

Szanto was born in Budapest, Hungary in 1905. Due to discrimination against Jews, he travelled to Vienna to attend medical school, where he met his wife Amalia Szanto. He completed his medical degree in 1929 and did his residency in both Berlin and Vienna. He fled Austria with his wife and small son, Philip, six weeks after the Nazi Anschluss.

Szanto was the head of the Pathology Department at Cook County Hospital for 26 years. At the time it was the largest pathology department in the world. Paul Szanto was also head of pathology at the Chicago Medical School. Szanto authored more than 200 articles in medical journals and won numerous awards for his teaching and research. Szanto was one of the leading liver pathologists in the world and helped identify the mechanism that leads to hepatocellular carcinoma in alcoholics.

Szanto was also a major force behind the Chicago Medical School's growth and expansion. Paul Szanto's wife, Amalia, died in 1979. Szanto married Harriet Mazel Szanto in 1983. Both of his sons, Philip and Martin, followed his footsteps into medicine.

His grandson, Michael J. Szanto, is a foreign policy expert.
