= Gustav Morelli =

Engraver and illustrator (1848–1909)

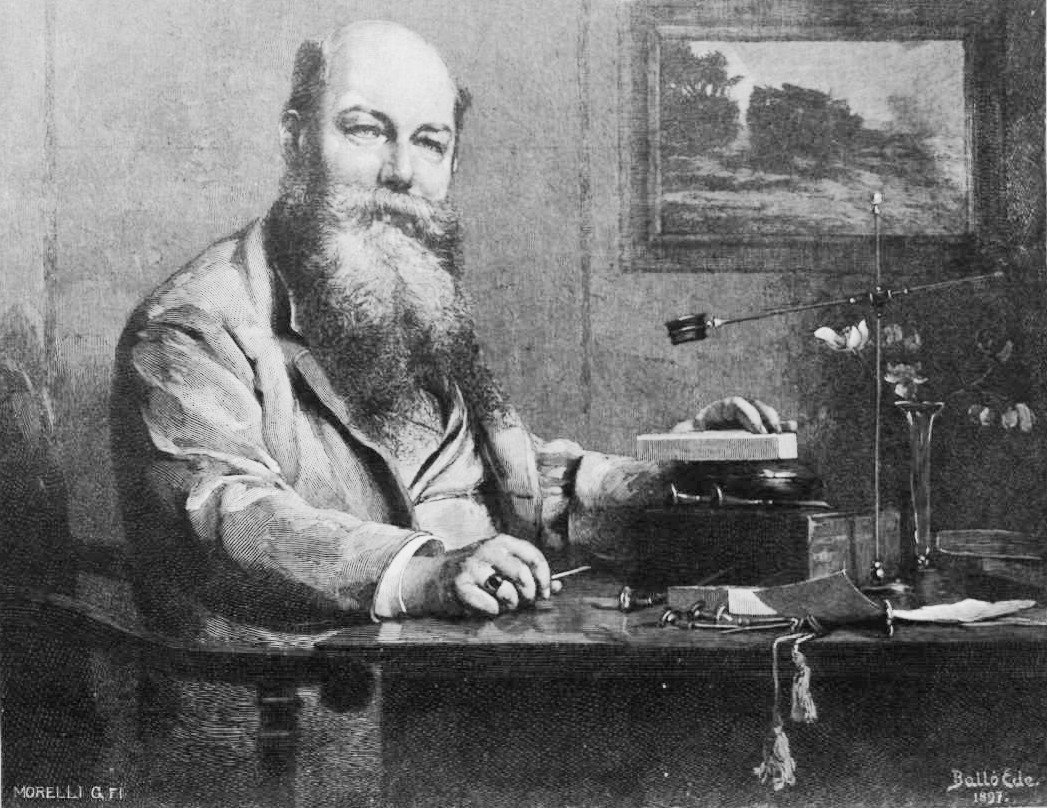
- Born: 15 February 1848; Pest, Hungary
- Died: 21 March 1909 (aged 61); Budapest, Hungary
- Occupations: Engraver; Illustrator
- Known for: Woodcuts
- Awards: Knights Cross of the Order of Franz Joseph

Gustav Morelli (15 February 1848 – 21 March 1909) was a Hungarian engraver and illustrator who specialized in the woodcut technique. He was born in Pest, Hungary, and died in Budapest.

== Education ==
After completing his schooling in Debrecen, he began studying woodcut art. He was associated with the Károly Rusz Institute until 1868.

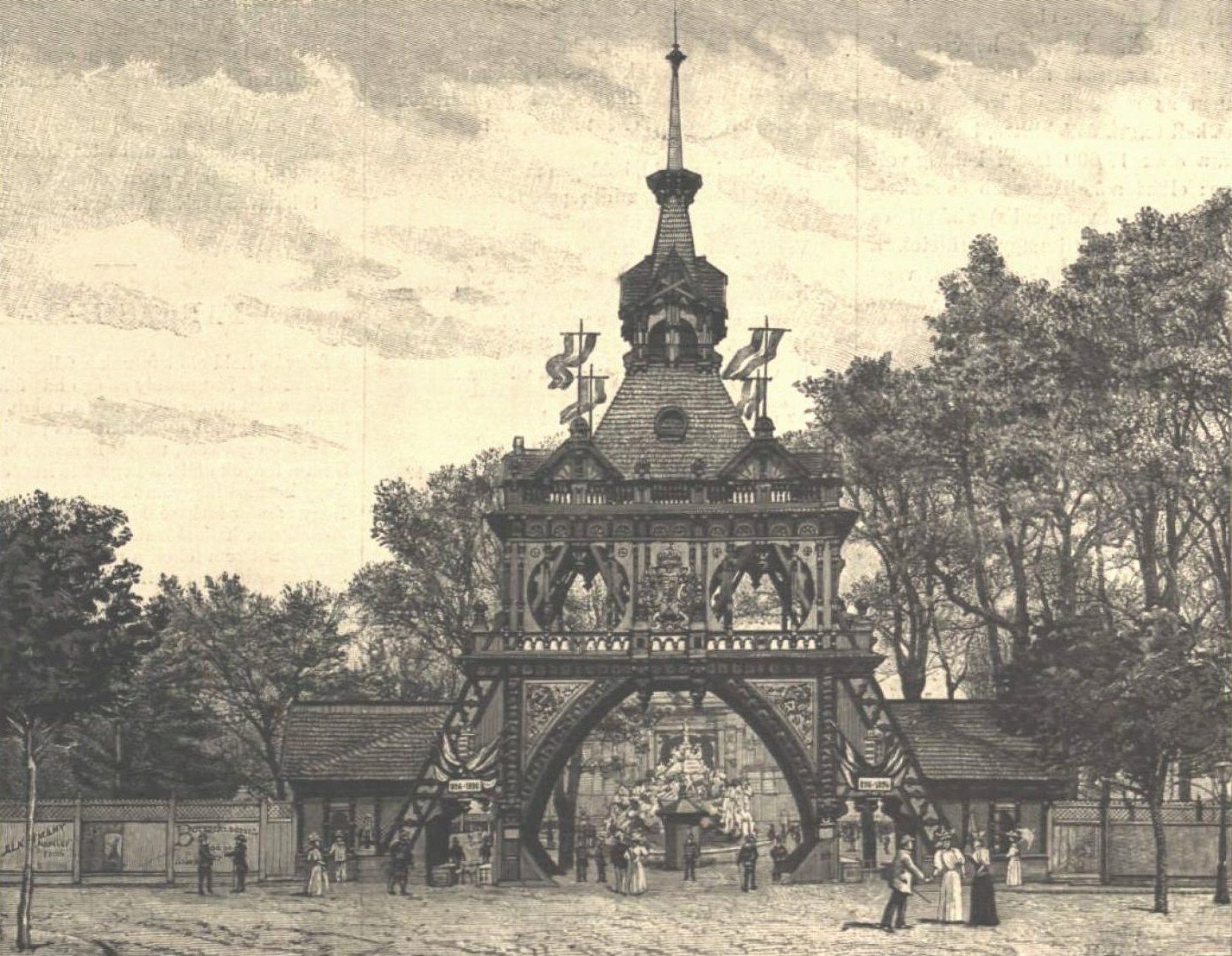
Gate of the 1896 Millennial exhibition in Budapest

== Career ==
During this time many Hungarian painters, including Mihály Munkácsy worked as wood engravers. Morelli worked in the trade independently for Balázs Orbán and also worked for the Sunday News. In 1869, he traveled to Paris on a scholarship to study woodcutting, remaining there throughout the Franco-Prussian War. He later went to Leipzig, returning to his hometown in the spring of 1872, and settling there permanently. He worked with artists such as Gusztáv Kelety, Géza Mészöly, and János Greguss at the Sunday News. At the same time, about 50 of his images were commissioned for the first illustrated edition of Petofi. Morelli's success led the government to establish in 1873 the national art teacher woodcutter class. In 1876, Petofi's second edition of decorative woodcut images was produced.

Morelli exhibited at the 1885 and 1891 National Exhibitions. In 1889, he went on a study tour to various woodcutting institutes, visiting Munich, Cologne, Brussels, London, Rotterdam, The Hague, Utrecht and Amsterdam. In the spring of 1895, he completed pictures on a 0.5 metres (1 ft 8 in) section of wood, which by volume, was said to be unequaled. His work is included in the collections of the Witt Library. One of Morelli's wood engravings was a reproduction of a painting by Árpád Feszty of chieftain Árpád and the arrival of the Magyars. In 1902 he was awarded the Knights Cross of the Order of Franz Joseph.
