= Heves County 1st constituency =

Hungarian national legislative constituency

Heves County 1st constituency (Eger)
- Constituency for the National Assembly
- Location of Heves county 01 within Heves county

- Location of Heves county within Hungary
- County: Heves
- Electorate: 80,288 (2018)
- Major settlements: Eger

Current constituency
- Created: 2011
- Party: Tisza Party
- Member: Péter Bódis
- Created from: Constituency no. 1; Constituency no. 6
- Elected: 2026

The 1st constituency of Heves County (Hungarian: Heves megyei 01. számú országgyűlési egyéni választókerület) is one of the single member constituencies of the National Assembly, the national legislature of Hungary. The constituency standard abbreviation: Heves 01. OEVK.

Since 2026, it has been represented by Péter Bódis of the Tisza Party.

== Geography ==
The 1st constituency is located in the eastern part of Heves County.

The constituency borders the 2nd constituency to the west and northwest, the 6th constituency of Borsod-Abaúj-Zemplén County to the east, the 3rd constituency of Jász-Nagykun-Szolnok County to the southeast and the 3rd constituency of Heves County to the southwest.

=== List of municipalities ===
The constituency includes the following municipalities:

1. Andornaktálya
2. Átány
3. Besenyőtelek
4. Demjén
5. Dormánd
6. Eger
7. Egerbakta
8. Egerfarmos
9. Egerszalók
10. Egerszólát
11. Felsőtárkány
12. Füzesabony
13. Kerecsend
14. Kömlő
15. Maklár
16. Mezőszemere
17. Mezőtárkány
18. Nagytálya
19. Noszvaj
20. Novaj
21. Ostoros
22. Poroszló
23. Sarud
24. Szarvaskő
25. Szihalom
26. Tiszanána
27. Újlőrincfalva

== History ==
The current 1st constituency of Heves County was created in 2011 and contains the pre-2011 1st and 6th constituencies of Heves County. Its borders have not changed since its creation.

== Members ==
The constituency was first represented by Zsolt Nyitrai of the Fidesz from 2014 to 2022. He was succeeded by Gábor Pajtók of the Fidesz in 2022. In the 2026 election, Péter Bódis of the Tisza Party was elected representative.

Election	Member	Party	%	Ref.
2014	Zsolt Nyitrai	Fidesz	38.94	
2018	Zsolt Nyitrai	Fidesz	46.44	
2022	Gábor Pajtók	Fidesz	52.19	
2026	Péter Bódis	TISZA	55.54	

== Election result ==
=== 2022 election ===
Result 2022
1. Dr. Gábor Pajtók, Fidesz–KDNP (52.2%)
2. Mátyás Berecz, United for Hungary (36.5%)
3. Dr. Ákos Pápai, Our Homeland (6.90%)
4. Veronika Vass, MKKP (2.50%)
5. Nándor Oszvald, MEMO (1.10%)
6. Ágnes Nagy, NÉP (0.80%)

2022 parliamentary election: Heves County - 1st constituency
Party	Candidate	Votes	%	±%
Fidesz–KDNP	Dr. Gábor Pajtók	29,703	52.19	+5.75
United for Hungary	Mátyás Berecz	20,772	36.5	
Mi Hazánk	Dr. Ákos Pápai	3,945	6.93	New
MKKP	Veronika Vass	1,400	2.46	+1.33
MEMO	Sándor Béla Kacsó	634	1.11	New
NÉP	Ágnes Nagy	454	0.8	New
Majority		8,931	15.69	
Turnout		57,616	70.93	▼0.45
Registered electors		81,233		
Fidesz–KDNP hold		Swing	+8.5	

=== 2018 election ===
Result 2018
1. Zsolt Nyitrai, Fidesz–KDNP (46.4%)
2. Ádám Mirkóczki, Jobbik (39.2%)
3. Noémi Kertészné Kormos, DK (6.80%)
4. Csaba Komlósi, LMP (3.30%)
5. Dr. László Csorba, Independent (1.20%)
6. Zoltán Várady, MKKP (1.10%)
7. Csaba Vámos, Independent (1.00%)
8. Other parties (less than 1%) (1.00%)

2018 parliamentary election: Heves County - 1st constituency
Party	Candidate	Votes	%	±%
Fidesz–KDNP	Zsolt Nyitrai	27,374	46.44	+7.5
Jobbik	Ádám Mirkóczki	23,115	39.22	+10.85
DK	Noémi Kertészné Kormos	3,987	6.76	as Unity
LMP	Csaba Komlósi	1,914	3.25	−1.4
Independent	Dr. László Csorba	676	1.15	
MKKP	Zoltán Várady	664	1.13	New
Independent	Csaba Vámos	609	1.03	
Family Party	István Molnár	192	0.33	
MIÉP	Anikó Csilla Varga	87	0.15	
SEM	Viktória Komora	86	0.15	
Common Ground	Katalin Bíró	48	0.08	
Go Hungary!	Boglárka Lajtos	39	0.07	
EU.ROM	Dénes Malacsik	37	0.06	+0.03
Iránytű	Dr. Krisztián Kovács	36	0.06	
Democratic Party	Tamás Bátori	35	0.06	
Order Party	Jánosné Ragályi	19	0.03	
ÖP	Jolán Erzsébet Déri	14	0.02	−0.2
Everyone's Homeland	Anett Berecz	12	0.02	
Majority		4,259	7.22	
Turnout		59,559	71.38	▲6.8
Registered electors		83,445		
Fidesz–KDNP hold		Swing	-3.4	

=== 2014 election ===
Result 2014
1. Dr. Zsolt Péter Nyitrai, Fidesz–KDNP (38.9%)
2. Ádám Mirkóczki, Jobbik (28.4%)
3. Dr. Géza György Szalóczi, Unity (25.4%)
4. Dr. Ákos Csarnó, LMP (4.70%)
5. Other parties (less than 1%) (2.60%)

2014 parliamentary election: Heves County - 1st constituency
Party	Candidate	Votes	%	±%
Fidesz–KDNP	Dr. Zsolt Péter Nyitrai	21,151	38.94	
Jobbik	Ádám Mirkóczki	15,410	28.37	
Unity	Dr. Géza György Szalóczi	13,781	25.37	
LMP	Dr. Ákos Csarnó	2,528	4.65	
Independent	Szabolcs Juhász	279	0.51	
Party of Greens	Gábor Kecskés	276	0.51	
Motherland Party	Sándor Gábor Faludi	269	0.5	
MCP	Géza Barkóczi	249	0.46	
Soc Dems	Pál Bodnár	228	0.42	
ÖP	István Balogh	121	0.22	
EU.ROM	Rozália Szamkó	19	0.03	
Majority		5,741	10.57	
Turnout		54,899	64.58	
Registered electors		85,005		
Fidesz–KDNP win (new seat)				
