= Godot Gallery =

Contemporary art gallery in Hungary

Godot Gallery (Hungarian: Godot Galéria) is a contemporary art gallery in Budapest, Hungary. It was founded in 1999 by Zoltán Sáfár and Bálint Kaucsek and focuses on contemporary Hungarian art. The gallery is located at 11–13 Bartók Béla út in Újbuda, Budapest’s 11th district. It is part of the Godot Institute of Contemporary Art and has its own exhibition programme.

== History ==
The gallery opened at 8 Madách Imre út in Budapest’s 7th district. Its early programme included group exhibitions, and it developed longer-term relationships with artists including József Szurcsik and József Gaál. Gábor Kozák joined the gallery in 2000 and went on to direct it.

The stand-up comedy theatre Dumaszínház began at the neighbouring Godot Café in 2003. By 2011 the gallery had moved to Bartók Béla út. The arts venue TELEP later took over the former Madách Imre út premises.

In 2009 the gallery participated in two international art fairs, Berliner Liste in Berlin and Art Vilnius in Vilnius. It also ran a ten-day summer residency in Mezőszemere for artists selected through its art fair. The call for the 2018 residency offered participants accommodation, meals and funding for materials.

== Exhibitions and artists ==
The gallery presents solo and group exhibitions. Its Contemporary Private Collections series brought privately held works into public exhibitions. In 2012, for example, it presented a selection from the collection of Károly Gerendai, including works by Imre Bukta, El Kazovsky and István Nádler. The gallery’s exhibitions have also featured work by drMáriás, László feLugossy, József Gaál, József Szurcsik, Péter Ujházi and Dezső Váli.

== Relationship with the Godot Institute of Contemporary Art ==
Zoltán Sáfár and Borbála Laczkovich opened the Godot Institute of Contemporary Art in 2019 at the former Goldberger textile factory in Óbuda. The Institute presents large-scale exhibitions and hosts the Godot Art Expo. Godot Labor Gallery, also at the Óbuda site, provides space for exhibitions by emerging artists and for experimental projects. Godot Gallery continues to operate as a commercial gallery on Bartók Béla út.
