= Tófalu =

- Village
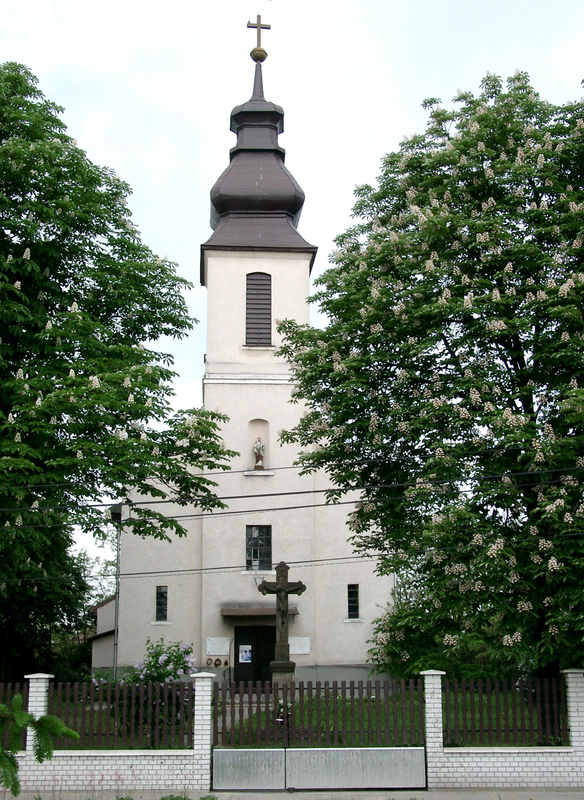
- Trinity church

- Coat of arms

- Location in Hungary
- Coordinates: 47°46′34″N 20°14′13″E
- Country: Hungary
- County: Heves
- District: Füzesabony
- First mentioned: 1352

Government
  - Mayor: Szabolcs András Ignácz (Ind.)

Area
  - Total: 14.48 km^{2} (5.59 sq mi)

Population (2022)
  - Total: 537
  - Density: 37.1/km^{2} (96.1/sq mi)
- Time zone: UTC+1 (CET)
  - Summer (DST): UTC+2 (CEST)
- Postal code: 3354
- Area code: 36
- Website: http://www.tofalu.hu/

Tófalu is a village in Heves County, Hungary, beside of the Tarna River. As of 2022 census, it has a population of 537 (see Demographics). The village located beside of the (Nr. 84) Kisterenye–Kál-Kápolna railway line and 2,2 km far from the main road 3 and 8 km far from the M3 motorway. Although the settlement has its own railway stop, public transport on the railway line ceased on March 3, 2007. The closest train station with public transport in Kál 5,5 km far.

== History ==
The name of the village is mentioned in a certificate in the form of Tóthfalu in 1352. It was owned by the Debrei family from the Aba clan. After the death of Miklós Debrei childless in 1417, with the consent of King Sigismund, it became the property of Stephen Kompolt. In 1438, it came into the possession of the Rozgonyi family from the hands of its owners, who were guilty of infidelity. The village was the property of Kristóf Országh in the first half of 16th the century. It was inhabited by 45 serfs in 1549 whose established a two-wheeled mill. It becomes completely uninhabited from 1552, because of the Ottoman invasion. It became part of the Debrő and then Ónod manors in 1564, and was again populated. It was inhabited by 10 serfs in 1576. It was the mortgaged property of Eger castle captain Baron Christoph von Ungnad from 1575. Ungnad's widow, Anna Losonczi, gives it to her third husband, Count Sigismund Forgách in 1590. After the next Ottoman invasion it was destroyed again, and uninhabited.
Baron Sigismund Rákóczi in 1603 bought the entire Debrő-Ónód estate (and Tófalu) also became Rákóczi's estate for a century. Between 1670 and 1676 Prince Francis I Rákóczi owned one half of the village and Erzsébet Rákóczi the other half. The 11 serfs living on 5 plots at that time. It became depopulated for a decade as a result of the evacuation in preparation for the blockade of Eger. They were able to enumerate 5 newly settled squires in 1696. Among the 37 adult tax-paying serfs, there were already 18 newly landed farmers in 1701, among five Slovaks of whom came from Detva. In the first years, the farmers made a living by brewing brandy and harvesting forest wood. Erzsébet Rákóczi died without an heir in 1708, her part of the estate here was given to Prince Francis II Rákóczi and his sister Julianna Rákóczi. After the Rákóczi's War of Independence, the prince's property was confiscated by the ruler and it donates to Michael Friedrich von Althann. In the 1730's Count Antal I Grassalkovich bought all the estates, and thus Tófalu belonging to the Debrő-Parád estate. After the Antal III Grassalkovich dies without issue in 1841, Count János Forgách gets it, but in 1847 he sold it to Count György Károlyi. The landlord's ninth and the church's tithe are given by the serfs in kind from grain crops, as well as from peas, lentils, hemp, corn, tobacco, cabbage, pumpkin, linseed, beans, and lamb.
35 Jews lived in the village in 1880 and in 1944 about 20 of them were murdered in the Holocaust. In 1950 the village merged with the village of Aldebrő and was called Tódebrő. In 1958 each village returned to its independence.

== Demographics ==
According the 2022 census, 90.3% of the population were of Hungarian ethnicity, 0.7% were Gypsies, 0,6% were Germans and 9.7% were did not wish to answer. The religious distribution was as follows: 42.2% Roman Catholic, 2.2% Calvinist, 0.7% Greek Catholic, 14.7% non-denominational, and 38.5% did not wish to answer. The Gypsies have a local nationality government. No population in farms.

== Politics ==
Mayors since 1990:

- 1990–1994: Dezső Páll (MDF)
- 1994–1998: László Szalai (independent)
- 1998–2014: József Kerek (independent)
- 2014–: Szabolcs András Ignácz (independent)
