= Aldebrő =

- Village
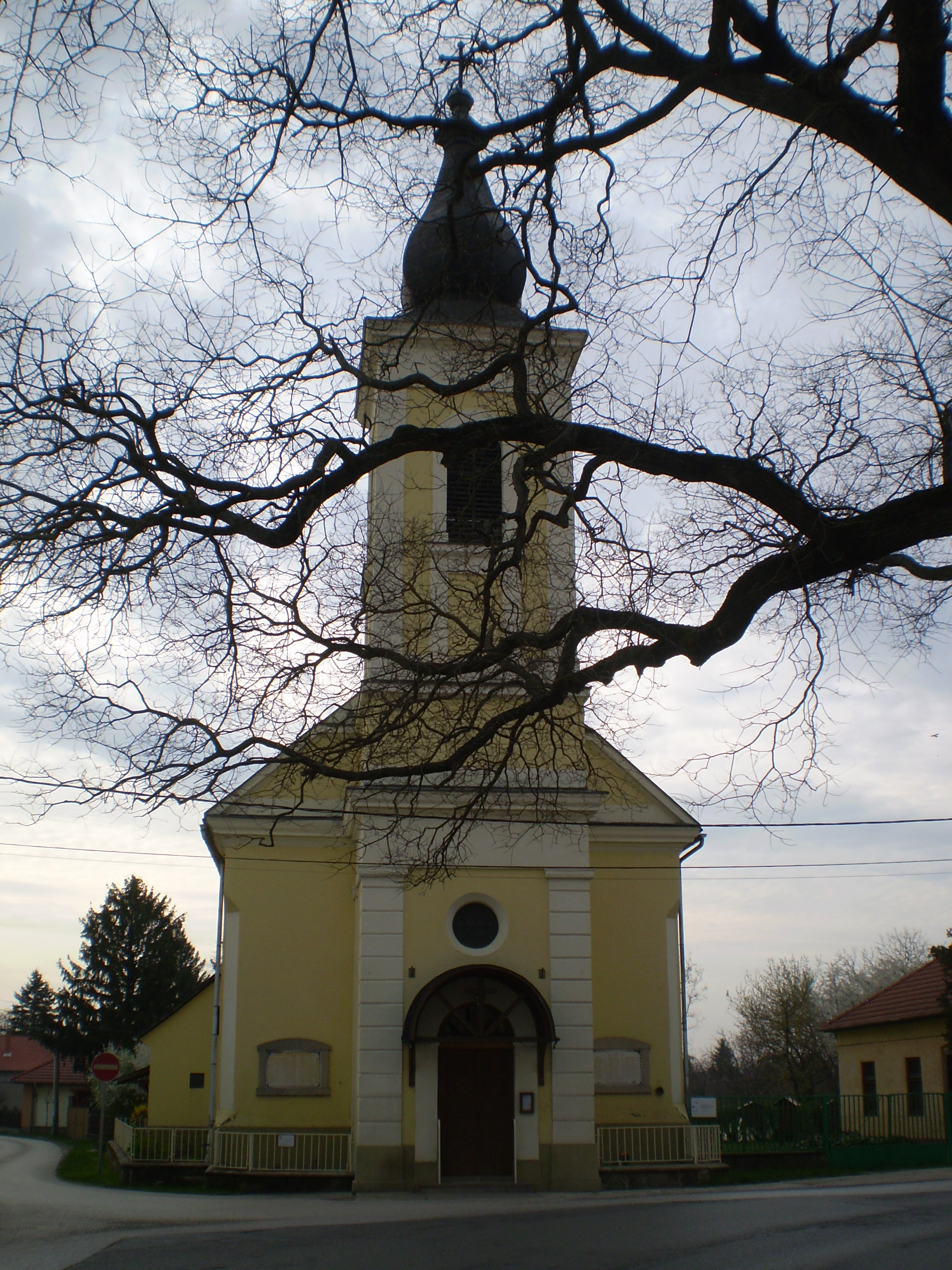
- Church of Pentecost

- Coat of arms

- Location in Hungary
- Coordinates: 47°47′17″N 20°13′46″E
- Country: Hungary
- County: Heves
- District: Füzesabony
- Establishment: 1743
- Founder: Antal Grassalkovich

Government
  - Mayor: János Wingendorf (Fidesz–KDNP)

Area
  - Total: 21.78 km^{2} (8.41 sq mi)

Population (2022)
  - Total: 675
  - Density: 31.0/km^{2} (80.3/sq mi)
- Time zone: UTC+1 (CET)
  - Summer (DST): UTC+2 (CEST)
- Postal code: 3353, 3355
- Area code: 36
- Website: www.aldebro.hu

Aldebrő is a village in Heves County, Hungary, beside the Tarna River. As of 2022 census, it has a population of 675 (see Demographics). The village is located beside of the (Nr. 84) Kisterenye–Kál-Kápolna railway line and 3,8 km far from the main road 3 and 9,5 km far from the M3 motorway. Although the settlement has its railway stop, public transport on the railway line ceased on March 3, 2007. The closest train station with public transport in Kál 7,1 km far.

== History ==
The village of Aldebrő itself was established under this name only from the beginning of the 1740s, on the site of the medieval village of Csal, which belonged to the village of Debrő as a wasteland from the Turkish subjugation era. The origin of the place name Debrő is the noun "debrő" meaning a wide, flat valley in the old Hungarian language. During the 13th century, Debrő became the center of the manor of the same name. The villages of Csal and Püspüki were also part of the manor. The seed of the Debrey estate - i.e. Debrő (otherwise known as the villages of Szentgyörgy, Tófalu, Német-Kál and Csal) was first sown by the "Debrey family" from the Aba clan, because he united them. The history of the village is organically connected to the Debrő manor.
The area was owned by the Aba clan for a long time, but István Debrey, a member of the clan, sided with the king's enemies in 1403. From then on, the property changed hands. With the permission of King Sigismund in 1417, the surrounding villages were occupied by Stephen Kompolt, and then became the Rozgonyi family. Stephen Rozgonyi sold Debrő Castle and the surrounding areas in 1493 to György Kanizsay, who in 1497 exchanged it with Bartolomeu Dragfi. Imre Perényi acquired Debrő Castle in 1518, also known as Csali Castle, from John Drágfi. King Ferdinand I donated Debrő Castle and its accessories in 1537 to László Országh. Due to the advancing Ottomans in 1544, the inhabitants of the villages of Balpüspüki and Csal left. They were never populated again.
Probably in 1552, the Ottomans destroyed the Debrő castle. In 1575, King Maximilian pledged the dilapidated castle and its accessories to Baron Christoph von Ungnad, the chief captain of Eger. His widow Anna Losonczi gifted the estate to her second husband Count Sigismund Forgách in 1590. Baron Sigismund Rákóczi bought the destroyed castle in 1603, together with all its accessories. After the fall of the Rákóczi's War of Independence the estates of Prince Francis II Rákóczi were confiscated by the court, and half of the Debrő manor was donated to Michael Friedrich von Althann. The other half remained in the hands of the Aspremont counts. Count Antal Grassalkovich bought the now-destroyed Debrő castle in 1740 and the Debrő manor belonging to it. On August 22, 1747, Antal Grassalkovich obtained a deed of donation from Maria Theresa for the royal rights of the castle in Debrő and the entire estate. This change of ownership had a decisive influence on the life of the Debrő manor and its villages. One of Antal Grassalkovich's first actions was to bring a sufficient number of settlers to the sparsely populated area. The creation of Aldebrő was also a product of this installation campaign.
The first German settlers arrived in 1746. The church of Pentecost was built in 1760 and has a gallery and a tower. There was already a school in 1767. The Grassalkovich family died out in the male branch in 1841, after which the Debrő manor passed to Count Antal Forgách. The last tenant Count György Károlyi, bought the manor and the village of Aldebrő in 1847. The livelihood of the population of Aldebrő was formed by tobacco and grape growing. In order to provide for themselves, they worked in their gardens and under vineyards, growing fruit and vegetables, growing all kinds of melons and potatoes, and growing hemp for their clothing. In addition to growing crops, they raised cattle, horses and pigs, and kept bees. The Malom creek flows through the village, on which was the water mill owned by the landlord, where the inhabitants of the village ground their grain. Almost 90% of the population lived from agriculture. Grain and corn were grown on 70-75% of the arable land.
In the 19th century, tobacco cultivation declined, but grape growing and winemaking flourished. In 1950 the village merged with the village of Tófalu and was called Tódebrő. In 1958 each village returned to its independence. The settlement's new primary school was handed over in 1973. The Tarna dam system was built in 1978. Aldebrő won the 5-year flowering competition in 1981. Aldebrő also had its cultural center and library. The settlement has its district doctor, nurse, veterinarian and dentist. The medieval castle, which was mentioned for the first time in 1411, was within today's settlement, no traces of it remain. Nowadays the only uninhabited outskirt is "Erzsébet tér", what's 7,7 km far from the village, beside of the main road 3 and have a different postal code (3355).

== Demographics ==
According to the 2022 census, 92.2% of the population were of Hungarian ethnicity, 15,4% were Germans and 7.7% were did not wish to answer. The religious distribution was as follows: 44.4% Roman Catholic, 5.1% Calvinist, 0.9% Greek Catholic, 13.5% non-denominational, and 30.5% did not wish to answer. The Germans have a local nationality government. No population in farms.

Population by years:

Year	1870	1880	1890	1900	1910	1920	1930	1941
Population	1679	1237	1425	1392	1502	1526	1398	1366
Year	1949	1960	1970	1980	1990	2001	2011	2022
Population	1375	1251	1158	931	788	805	720	675

== Politics ==
Mayors since 1990:

- 1990–2014: László Márton Farkas (Until 2002 FKgP, between 1994 and 2002 supported by the KDNP and between 1994 and 1998 the MDF and the Fidesz too, but from 2002 independent)
- 2014–: János Wingendorf (Fidesz–KDNP)
