= Vályi =

Vályi is a surname. Notable people with the surname include:

- Gyula Vályi (1855–1913), Hungarian mathematician
- Ján Vályi (1837–1911), Slovak Greek Catholic hierarch
- Péter Vályi (1919–1973), Hungarian politician
- Vanda Vályi (born 1999), Hungarian water polo player
- Vilmos Vályi-Nagy (born 1971), Hungarian politician
