= Füzesabony District =

Coordinates: 47.7167°N 20.4667°E

Füzesabony District Füzesabonyi járás
- Districts of Hungary
- Coat of arms

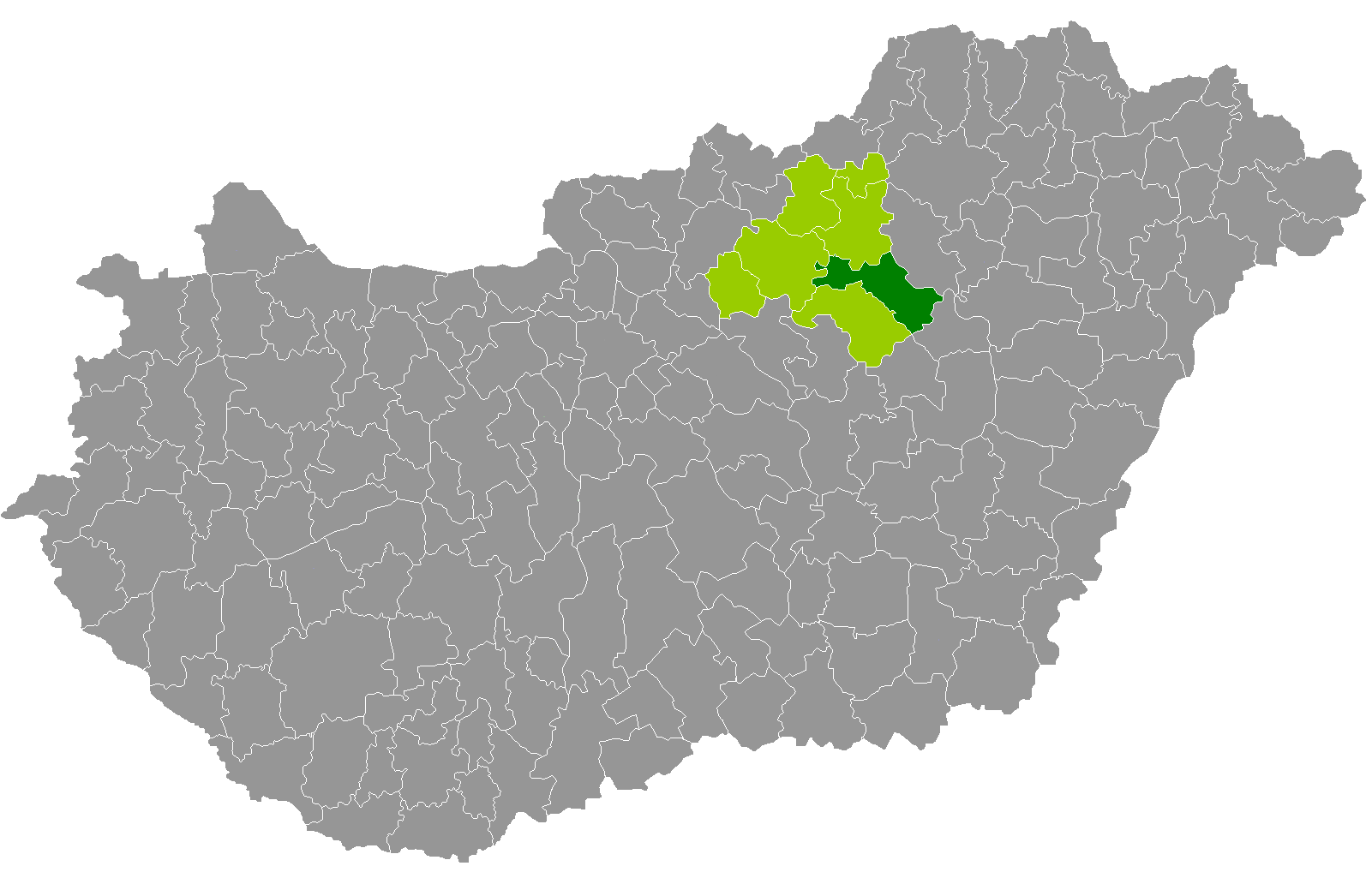
- Füzesabony District within Hungary and Heves County.
- Country: Hungary
- County: Heves
- District seat: Füzesabony

Area
  - Total: 578.55 km^{2} (223.38 sq mi)
  - Rank: 4th in Heves

Population (2011 census)
  - Total: 30,416
  - Rank: 5th in Heves
  - Density: 53/km^{2} (140/sq mi)

Füzesabony (Hungarian: Füzesabonyi járás) is a district in south-eastern part of Heves County. Füzesabony is also the name of the town where the district seat is found. The district is located in the Northern Hungary Statistical Region. Official currency — HUF (Hungarian Forint).

== Geography ==
Borders with Eger District to the north, Mezőkövesd District (Borsod-Abaúj-Zemplén County) and Tiszafüred District (Jász-Nagykun-Szolnok County) to the east, Heves District to the southwest, Gyöngyös District to the west. The number of the inhabited places in Füzesabony District is 16

Füzesabony District is located at the geographic coordinates of 47.7495339 latitude and 20.4150668 longitude. This district is located in the time zone Central European Summer Time.

== Municipalities ==
The district has 1 town, 1 large village and 14 villages.

(ordered by population, as of 1 January 2012)

- Aldebrő (649)
- Besenyőtelek (2,569)
- Dormánd (1,040)
- Egerfarmos (675)
- **Füzesabony** (7,781) – district seat
- Kál (3,501)
- Kápolna (1,575)
- Kompolt (2,098)
- Mezőszemere (1,232)
- Mezőtárkány (1,575)
- Nagyút (660)
- Poroszló (2,715)
- Sarud (1,126)
- Szihalom (1,938)
- Tófalu (526)
- Újlőrincfalva (250)

The bolded municipality is city, italics municipality is large village.

== Demographics ==
Religion in Füzesabony District (2011 census)
1. Catholic Church (51.6%)
2. Greek Catholicism (0.40%)
3. Calvinism (5.10%)
4. Lutheranism (0.10%)
5. Other religions (2.00%)
6. Non-religious (12.2%)
7. Atheists (0.60%)
8. Undeclared (28.0%)

In 2011, it had a population of 30,416 and the population density was 53/km^{2}.

Year	County population	Change
2011	30,416	n/a

=== Ethnicity ===
Besides the Hungarian majority, the main minorities are the Roma (approx. 3,000), German (250) and Romanian (100).

Total population (2011 census): 30,416
Ethnic groups (2011 census): Identified themselves: 29,126 persons:

- Hungarians: 25,815 (88.63%)
- Gypsies: 2,775 (9.53%)
- Others and indefinable: 536 (1.84%)

Approx. 1,500 persons in Füzesabony District did not declare their ethnic group at the 2011 census.

=== Religion ===
Religious adherence in the county according to 2011 census:

- Catholic – 15,809 (Roman Catholic – 15,694; Greek Catholic – 113);
- Reformed – 1,539;
- Evangelical – 45;
- other religions – 611;
- Non-religious – 3,711;
- Atheism – 185;
- Undeclared – 8,516.

== Gallery ==
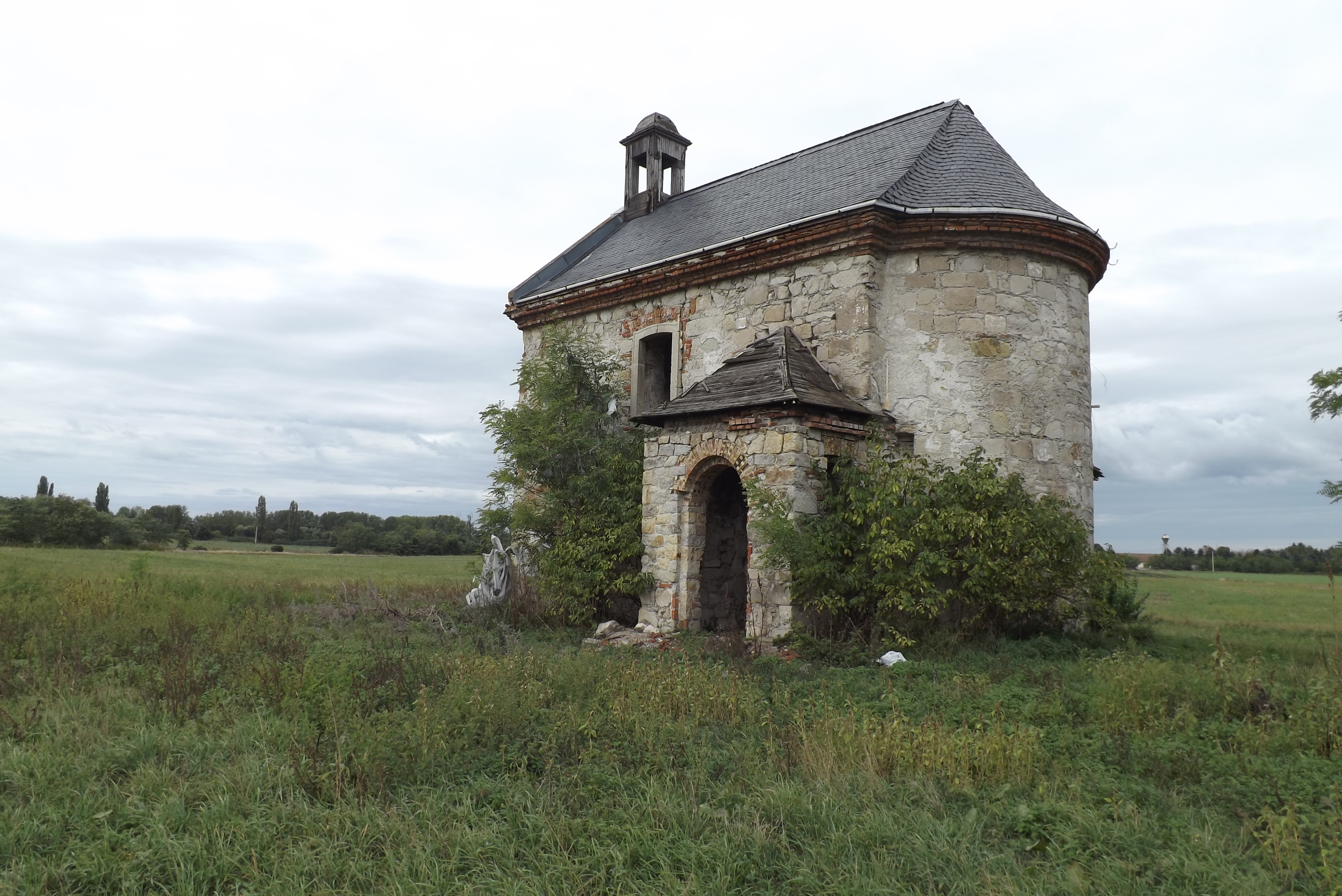
Füzesabony, Pusztaszikszó Chapel

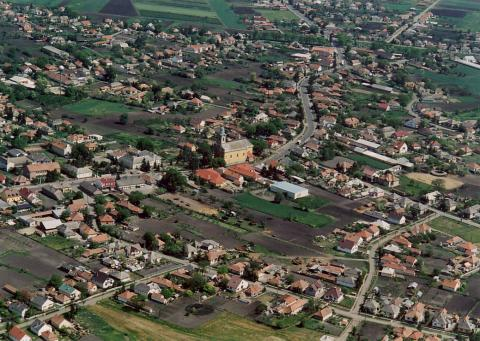
Aerial view of Besenyőtelek

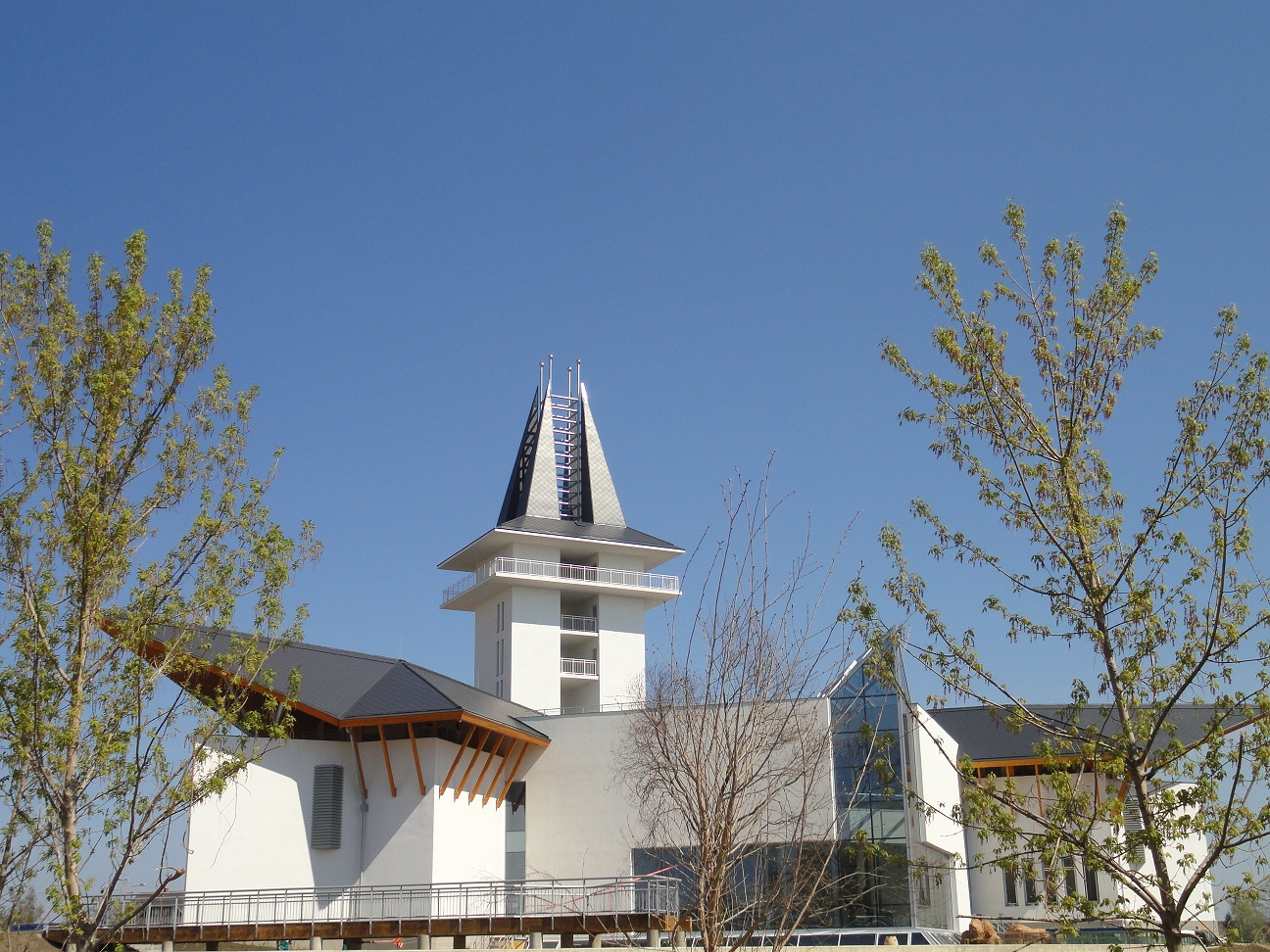
Lake Tisza EcoCentrum in Poroszló

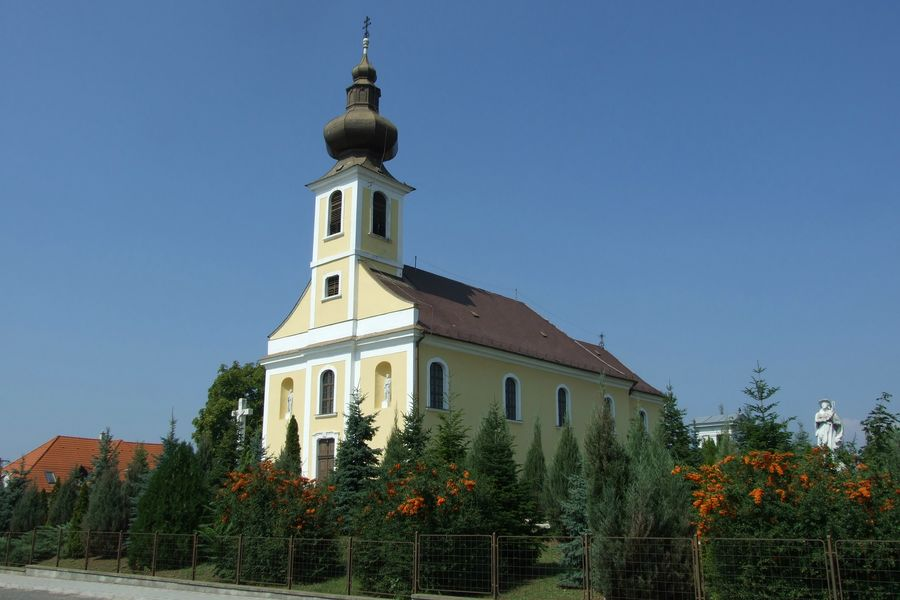
St. Peter and Paul Church in Kál

== See also ==
- List of cities and towns of Hungary
