= Godot Institute of Contemporary Art =

Contemporary art centre in Budapest, Hungary

Godot Institute of Contemporary Art (Hungarian: Godot Kortárs Művészeti Intézet) is a contemporary art centre in Budapest, Hungary. It is based in the former Goldberger textile factory in Óbuda. The institute stages exhibitions, organises an art fair and takes part in artist development programmes. Its exhibition venues include Godot Labor Gallery in Óbuda and Godot Gallery on Bartók Béla út.

== History ==
The institute grew out of Godot Gallery, which Zoltán Sáfár and Bálint Kaucsek founded in 1999 on Madách Imre út. The gallery later moved to Bartók Béla út.

Sáfár and Borbála Laczkovich began developing the institute in 2014. They envisaged a museum-style exhibition centre without a permanent collection, with space for surveys of individual artists’ work, thematic exhibitions and large installations. They opened the institute in Óbuda in 2019.

== Venues and exhibitions ==
The institute operates three exhibition spaces at two addresses in Budapest. Its Óbuda site at 21 Fényes Adolf utca has 1,100 square metres of exhibition space, comprising a 700-square-metre main hall and the 400-square-metre Godot Labor Gallery. The main hall hosts solo and group exhibitions. The Labor presents exhibitions by emerging artists, site-specific installations and experimental projects.

The two spaces can host separate exhibitions or be used together. In 2022–2023, Imre Bukta’s Let Us Cultivate Our Gardens (Műveljük kertjeinket!), curated by Gábor Gulyás, presented paintings, videos and room-sized installations across more than 1,000 square metres on several levels. The 2026 retrospective Éljen a diktatúra! by drMáriás occupied both the main hall and the Labor.

Godot Gallery, at 11–13 Bartók Béla út in Újbuda, represents artists and has its own programme of solo and group exhibitions.

== Programmes ==
=== Godot Art Expo ===
The Godot Art Expo is a group exhibition and art fair for emerging contemporary artists. It began in 2016 as a pop-up exhibition and fair organised by Godot Gallery at the Klauzál Square Market Hall in Budapest. It later ran as the Godot Young Generation Art Fair before adopting its current name. The eleventh edition took place at the Óbuda institute in 2026.

Artists apply through an open call. The 2025 and 2026 calls were open to visual artists under 40. A jury selects the works. In 2025 it shortlisted entries and examined the works in person before making the final selection.

Selected artists exhibit their work to the public and collectors, and visitors can buy works at the fair. The organisers call some on-site offers Gerillaár. Prizes can include a solo exhibition, mentoring or an artist residency. In 2025 and 2026 the Hungarian University of Fine Arts presented selected student work in a separate section as part of its jumpSTART programme.

=== Artist residencies ===
Godot Gallery’s ten-day summer programme in Mezőszemere offers places to prizewinners from the art fair. The 2018 call included accommodation, meals and funding for materials. A place on the programme was also among the prizes at the 2023 Godot Art Expo.

The 2025 and 2026 Expo calls both included a residency in Val-d’Aigoual, southern France, through the Mentőcsónak fellowship, as part of the main prize. In 2025, Kristóf Szabó (KristofLab) and Gergely Mindák, the 2024 Expo’s main prizewinner, worked there through the collaboration.

The two calls also offered residencies in Marrakesh through the Gauder Alkotóház programme and in The Hague in collaboration with NGO Dei. Under the 2026 call, the jury was to select the recipients of these special prizes.

=== International projects ===
In 2024 the institute presented Kérem, sóhajtson, Széchenyi úr!, an exhibition by Endre Koronczi curated by Luca Cserhalmi. The exhibition explored Koronczi’s research into air currents and breath. His related project Pneuma Cosmic represented Hungary at the 2026 Venice Biennale.
