= Godot Art Expo =

Hungarian art fair

Godot Art Expo is a group exhibition and art fair in Budapest, Hungary, featuring work by emerging contemporary artists. It grew out of an initiative by Godot Gallery and is organised by the Godot Institute of Contemporary Art in Óbuda. Works selected through an open call are shown in a public exhibition, where visitors can also purchase them.

== History ==
The expo began with a pop-up exhibition and fair that Godot Gallery held in December 2016 at the Klauzál Square Market Hall in Budapest. In 2017 the event continued as the Young Generation Art Fair in the Palatinus buildings on Jászai Mari Square. The opening of the 2019 fair formed part of the opening programme of the Godot Institute of Contemporary Art in Óbuda. The event later adopted the name Godot Art Expo.

The 2024 edition featured work by more than 100 emerging artists. The organisers counted the 2026 event as the eleventh edition.

== Open call, exhibition and sales ==
Artists apply through an open call. The 2025 and 2026 calls were open to visual artists under 40. A jury selects the works. The 2025 call specified that the jury would examine shortlisted works in person before choosing the final exhibition selection.

The selected artists show their work to the public and to collectors. Visitors can buy works at the fair. The organisers use the term Gerillaár for a price offered on selected works at the venue. This pricing approach was already used at the 2016 pop-up fair.

== Awards and artist programmes ==
Expo awards have included solo exhibitions, mentoring and artist residencies. The 2023 call offered a place at Godot Gallery’s summer artists’ programme in Mezőszemere. Gergely Mindák, the main prizewinner at the 2024 Expo, worked in Val-d'Aigoual, southern France, in 2025 through the Mentőcsónak fellowship. The French residency was also part of the main prize in the 2025 and 2026 calls. Both calls offered residency opportunities in Marrakesh and The Hague.

In 2025 and 2026 the Hungarian University of Fine Arts presented selected student work in a separate section of the Expo through its jumpSTART programme.
