= Kápolna =

- Village
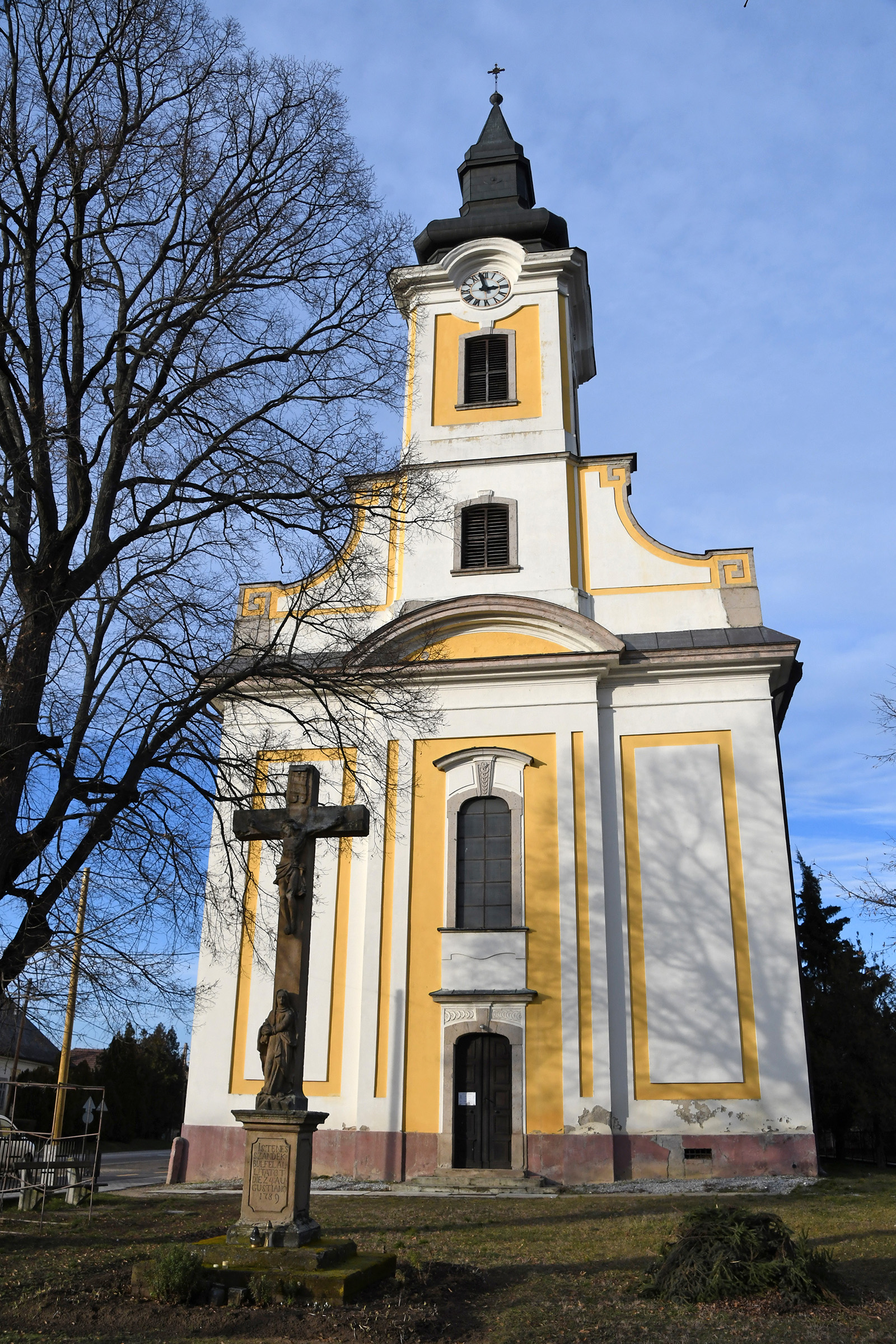
- Immaculate Conception church

- Coat of arms

- Location of Kápolna in Hungary
- Coordinates: 47°45′33″N 20°14′49″E
- Country: Hungary
- County: Heves
- District: Füzesabony
- First mentioned: 1430

Government
  - Mayor: Kálmán Berecz, Dr. (Ind.)

Area
  - Total: 21.51 km^{2} (8.31 sq mi)

Population (2022)
  - Total: 1,468
  - Density: 68.25/km^{2} (176.8/sq mi)
- Time zone: UTC+1 (CET)
  - Summer (DST): UTC+2 (CEST)
- Postal code: 3355
- Area code: 36
- Website: http://kapolna.hu/

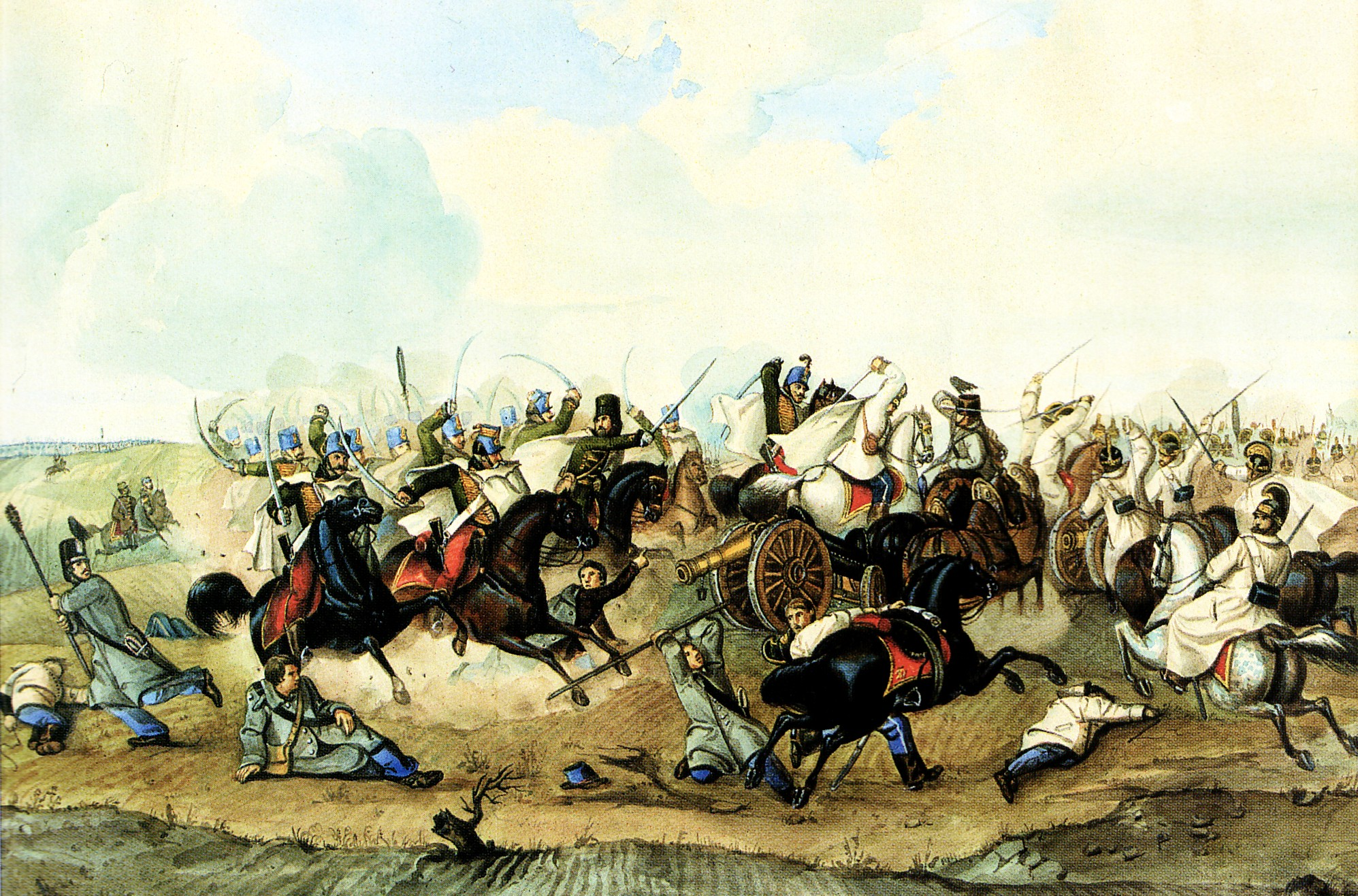
Battle of Kápolna (1849)

Mihály Károlyi distributing his lands among the peasants

Kápolna is a village in Heves County, Hungary, beside of the Tarna River. As of 2022 census, it has a population of 1,468 (see Demographics). The village located beside of the (Nr. 84) Kisterenye–Kál-Kápolna railway line and on the main road 3 and 5,7 km far from the M3 motorway. Although the settlement has its own railway stop, public transport on the railway line ceased on March 3, 2007. The closest train station with public transport in Kál 3,3 km far.

== History ==
A Copper Age copper chisel was found near the village, which shows that the area was already inhabited in early historical times. The name of the village was derived from the noun chapel. The settlement was presumably given this name because at the time of its creation it did not have a church, but only a small chapel. His name appears for the first time in a royal charter issued in 1430 as Kapolna. After the extinction of the Solymosi branch of the Aba family, King Sigismund donated the village to Peter Rozgonyi, Bishop of Eger (1425–1438), who handed it over to the diocese in exchange for an estate. Kápolna remained the property of the Roman Catholic Archdiocese of Eger until 1945. The village was destroyed by the Ottomans, at time of the two siege of Eger in 1552, and 1596. At that time, the village was located east of today's village, on the part now known as Pusztatemplom beach. After the end of Ottoman rule, it was repopulated around 1694, but already between the two branches of the Tarna River. In the 18th century the village began to develop: school, post office, inn, stone bridges, horse changing station, mills, manorial sheep farm and beekeeping established. In the 1760s, Germans, Czechs, and French settled in the village. The present-day monument church was completed in 1784 and the parish in 1789. On February 26–27 in 1849 was the Battle of Kápolna that makes the village famous even today took place as an event of the Hungarian Revolution and War of Independence of 1848–1849. The memorial column erected in memory of those who fell here, it was inaugurated on December 19, 1869, next to the then main road. This monument was also the first in the country to commemorate the Hungarian Revolution of 1848. The memory of the war is kept in the cemetery by the graves of the defenders from 1849, and the street names of the village. On the 150th anniversary of the Battle of Kápolna, the village commemorated the event that took place here with a sculpture composition erected in the then Kossuth-Dembinszky Memorial Park. The Tobacco Exchange Office was built in 1860, which began operating in 1868. In the second half of 19th century being operated regular medical care, pharmacy and kindergarten. On February 23, 1919 Mihály Károlyi the landowner and the first president of the country distributing his lands among the peasants. The land distribution memorial column placed on 80th anniversary. In the second half of the 20th century opened village library, gymnasium for the school. After 1989 the library functions as a cultural center, new doctor's office and folk museum opened.

== Demographics ==
According the 2022 census, 92.0% of the population were of Hungarian ethnicity, 18.7% were Gypsies, 2,3% were Germans and 8.0% were did not wish to answer. The religious distribution was as follows: 39.3% Roman Catholic, 1.8% Calvinist, 9.9% non-denominational, and 41.8% did not wish to answer. The Gypsies and Germans have a local nationality government. No population in farms.

Population by years:

Year	1870	1880	1890	1900	1910	1920	1930	1941
Population	1799	1860	1815	1714	1771	1837	1838	1767
Year	1949	1960	1970	1980	1990	2001	2011	2022
Population	1940	1899	1802	1630	1520	1618	1567	1468

== Politics ==
Mayors since 1990:

- 1990–1998: Mátyás Lendvai (MDF, from 1994 supported by the KDNP too)
- 1998–2002: István Molnár (independent)
- 2002–2006: Mátyás Lendvai (independent)
- 2006–: Kálmán Berecz, Dr. (independent)
