= Péter Bódis =

Hungarian politician

Member of the National Assembly
- Incumbent
- Assumed office 9 May 2026
- Preceded by: Gábor Pajtók
- Constituency: Heves 1st

Personal details
- Party: TISZA

Péter Bódis is a Hungarian politician who was elected member of the National Assembly in 2026. He works as a lawyer.
