= Dormánd =

- Village (község)
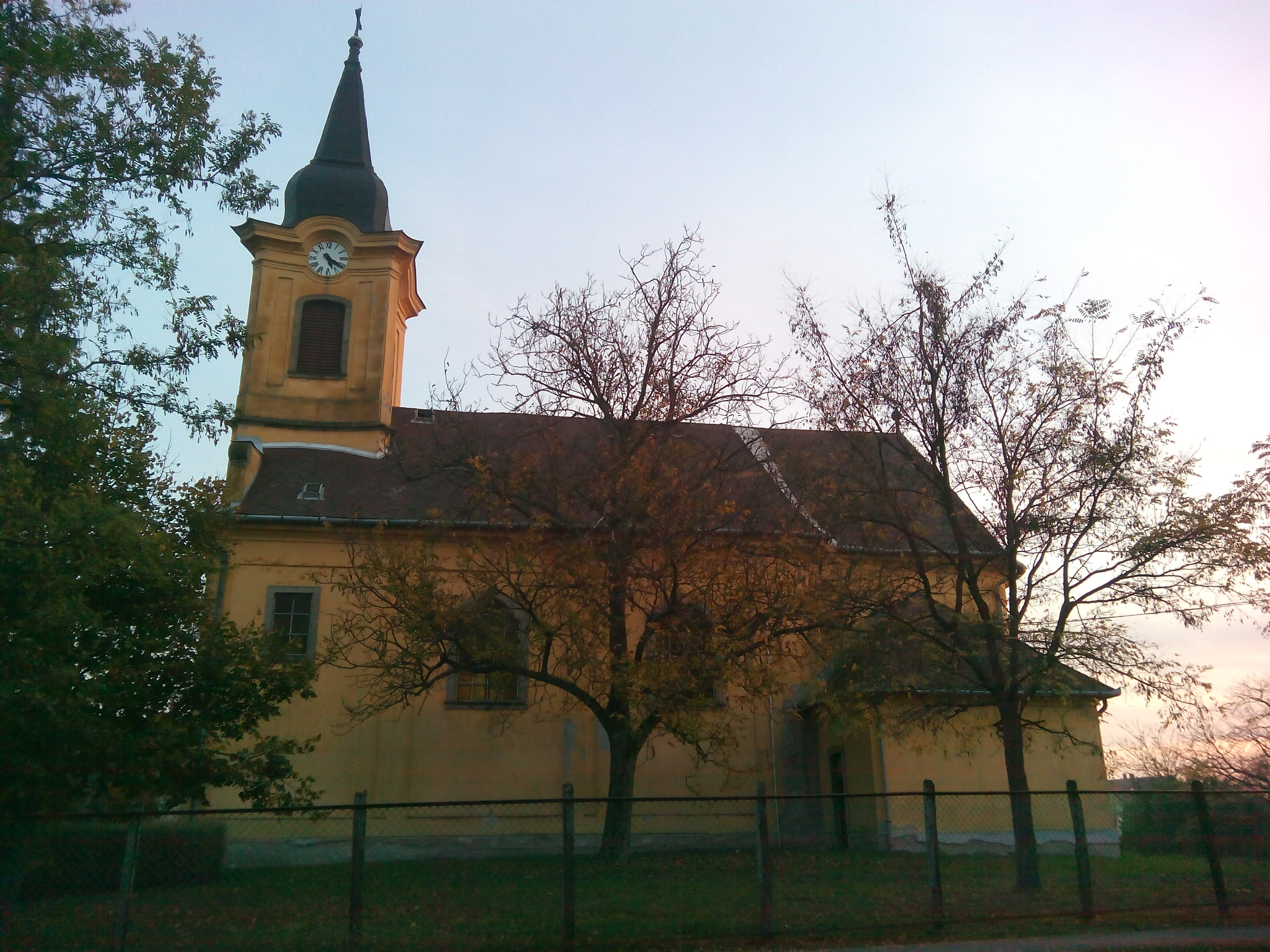

- Coat of arms

- Location of Heves County in Hungary

- Location of Dormánd in Hungary
- Coordinates: 47°43′16″N 20°25′05″E
- Country: Hungary
- Region: Northern Hungary
- County: Heves County
- Subregion: Füzesabony District

Government
  - Mayor: Kálmán László Rajna

Area
  - Total: 20.06 km^{2} (7.75 sq mi)

Population (1 Jan. 2019)
  - Total: 1,014
  - Density: 51/km^{2} (130/sq mi)
- Time zone: UTC+1 (CET)
  - Summer (DST): UTC+2 (CEST)
- Postal code: 3374
- Area code: 36
- Website: www.dormand.hu

Dormánd is a village in Heves County, Northern Hungary Region, Hungary.

== Geography ==
The village is located on the northern part of the Great Hungarian Plain, 4 km south from Füzesabony in Heves county.

== Communications ==
Dormánd is on Road 33 and here starts the Road 31.

== Sights to visit ==
- Church
- Zsigmond Remenyik museum
