= László Versényi =

Hungarian actor

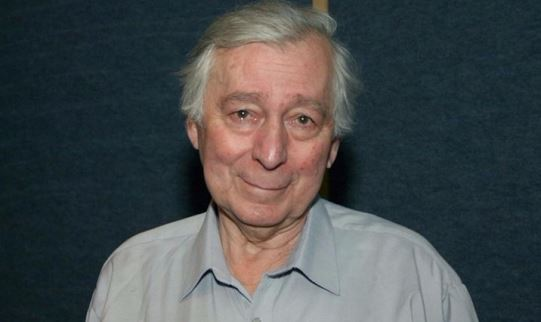
László Versényi

László Versényi (19 June 1931 – 26 January 2016) was a Hungarian actor at the National Theater in Budapest.

== Career ==
Born in Poroszló, Versényi graduated from high school in 1948 and, in 1958, started to act at the National Theatre. In 1986, he won first prize in an international competition of musical libretto for Dany und sein Haus. He provided the Hungarian dubbing of roles such as KITT from Knight Rider, Higgins from Magnum, P.I., Dr. Bullard from Midsomer Murders, and Yoda from the Star Wars series. He also played a role in the Hungarian soap opera Szomszédok.
