= Kál =

- Large village
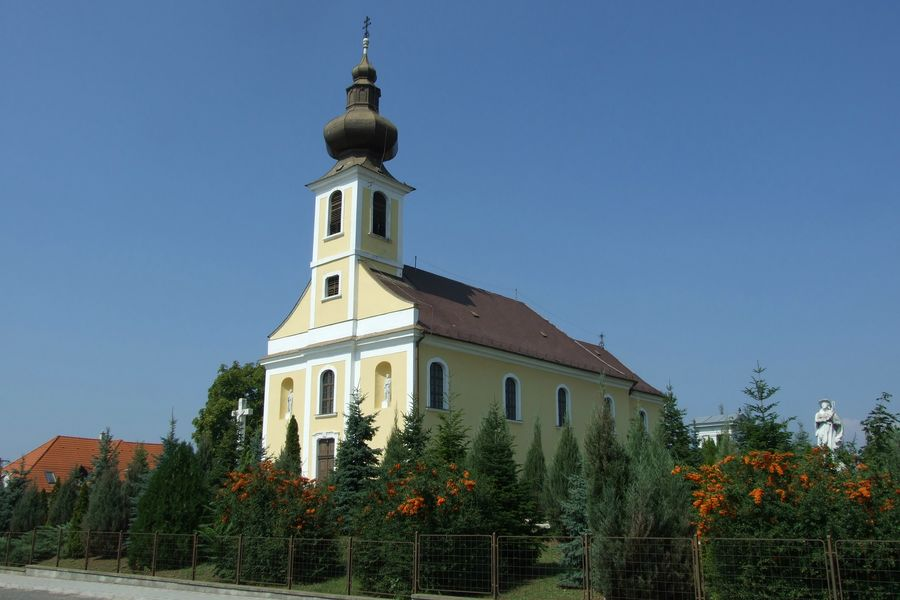
- Saints Peter and Paul church

- Coat of arms

- Location of Kál in Hungary
- Coordinates: 47°43′50″N 20°15′46″E
- Country: Hungary
- County: Heves
- District: Füzesabony
- First mentioned: 1331

Government
  - Mayor: János Morvai (Ind.)

Area
  - Total: 34.81 km^{2} (13.44 sq mi)

Population (2022)
  - Total: 3,392
  - Density: 97.44/km^{2} (252.4/sq mi)
- Time zone: UTC+1 (CET)
  - Summer (DST): UTC+2 (CEST)
- Postal code: 3350
- Area code: (+36) 36
- Website: www.kal.hu

Kál is a large village in Heves County, Hungary. As of 2022 census, it has a population of 3,392. (see Demographics) In the middle of the village located the "Kál-Kápolna" railway station on the (Nr. 80) Hatvan–Miskolc railway line, what is 3 km far from the M3 motorway and 3 km far from the main road 3.

== History ==
Kál was already an inhabited settlement before the Hungarian conquest. This is proven by the Scythian graves found during archaeological research. The first documented mention of the village dates from 1331. On June 25, 1603, the Chapter of Eger ceremoniously installed Kál in the Ónod castle as part of the accessories of the Ónod and Debrő castles. By this time, the population of the village had decreased again, presumably during the battles related to the Siege of Eger Castle in 1596 and its capture by the Ottomans. In 1597 only twelve serfs lived there. The 1701 census reports that the village was inhabited by six hereditary serfs and five immigrants, the latter of whom came here from Bod, Alatka, Nagyút, and Tófalu. During the Rákóczi's War of Independence, Kál was destroyed twice. At the end of 1706, one or two newcomers settled again. In 1741, the estate of Debrő was transferred to Count Antal Grassalkovich, who issued the settlement contract for the settlement of the Kál wasteland with serfs. The Josephinian Land Survey can be considered one of the most important wellheads of Kál in the 18th century. The Hungarian Revolution of 1848 also had a great impact on the people of Kál. The Battle of Kápolna fought on February 26–27, 1849, also extended to this village. In 1896, there was a national agricultural census in Hungary, from the material of which it emerges that there were 514 farms in the territory of the settlement.

== Demographics ==
According the 2022 census, 88.4% of the population were of Hungarian ethnicity, 4.3% were Gypsies, and 11.6% were did not wish to answer. The religious distribution was as follows: 33.8% Roman Catholic, 1.9% Calvinist, 16.7% non-denominational, and 43.5% did not wish to answer. The Gypsies have a local nationality government. 3378 inhabitants live in the village and 45 in farms.

Population by years:

Year	1870	1880	1890	1900	1910	1920	1930	1941
Population	2742	2682	2995	3151	3314	3696	4016	4067
Year	1949	1960	1970	1980	1990	2001	2011	2022
Population	4191	4471	4461	3914	3575	3673	3681	3392

== Politics ==
Mayors since 1990:

- 1990–2010: Vilmos Tompa (independent)
- 2010–: János Morvai (independent)
