= Besenyőtelek =

- Village (község)
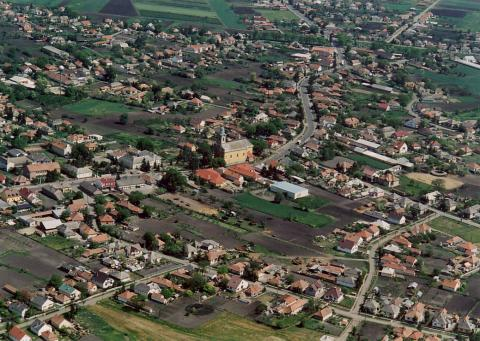

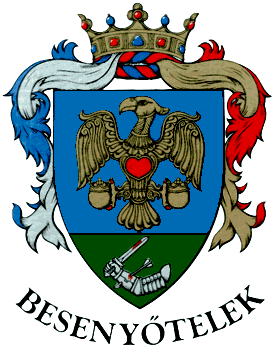
- Coat of arms

- Location of Heves County in Hungary

- Location of Besenyőtelek in Hungary
- Coordinates: 47°42′00″N 20°25′55″E
- Country: Hungary
- Region: Northern Hungary
- County: Heves County
- Subregion: Füzesabony District

Government
  - Mayor: Csaba Bozsik

Area
  - Total: 49.1 km^{2} (19.0 sq mi)

Population (1 Jan. 2015)
  - Total: 2,588
  - Density: 52.48/km^{2} (135.9/sq mi)
- Time zone: UTC+1 (CET)
  - Summer (DST): UTC+2 (CEST)
- Postal code: 3373
- Area code: 36
- Website: besenyotelek.hu

Besenyőtelek is a village in Heves County, Northern Hungary Region, Hungary.
