= Nagyút =

- Village (község)
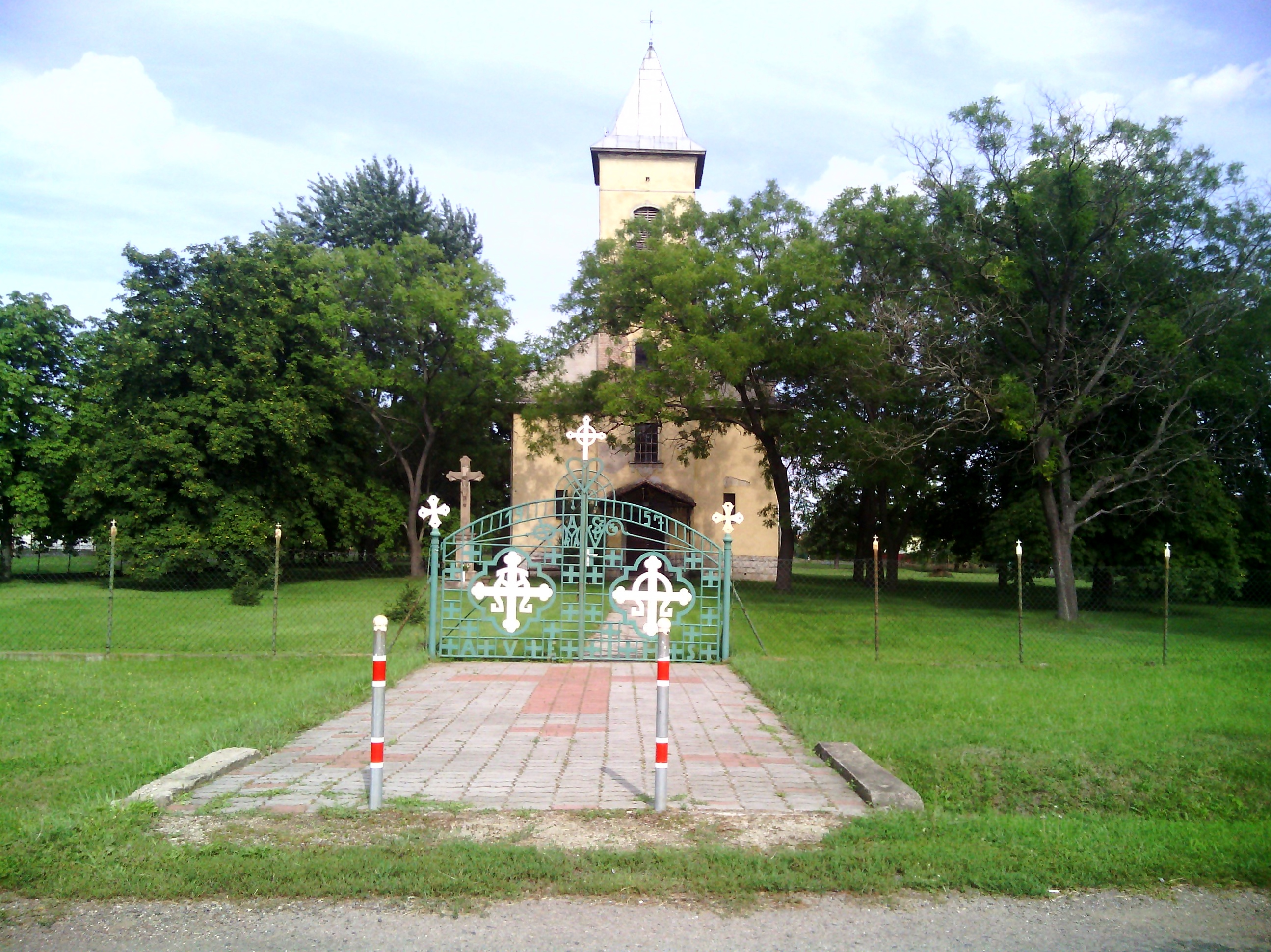
- St. Wendel's Church

- Coat of arms

- Location of Heves County in Hungary

- Location in Hungary
- Coordinates: 47°43′16″N 20°10′16″E
- Country: Hungary
- Region: Northern Hungary
- County: Heves County
- District: Füzesabony
- First mentioned: 1301

Government
  - Mayor: Géza Tóth (Ind.)

Area
  - Total: 18.94 km^{2} (7.31 sq mi)

Population (2015)
  - Total: 668
  - Density: 35.3/km^{2} (91.3/sq mi)
- Time zone: UTC+1 (CET)
  - Summer (DST): UTC+2 (CEST)
- Postal code: 3357
- Area code: 36
- Website: http://www.nagyut.hu/

Nagyút is a village in Heves County, Hungary.
