= Vilmos Vályi-Nagy =

Hungarian politician (born 1971)

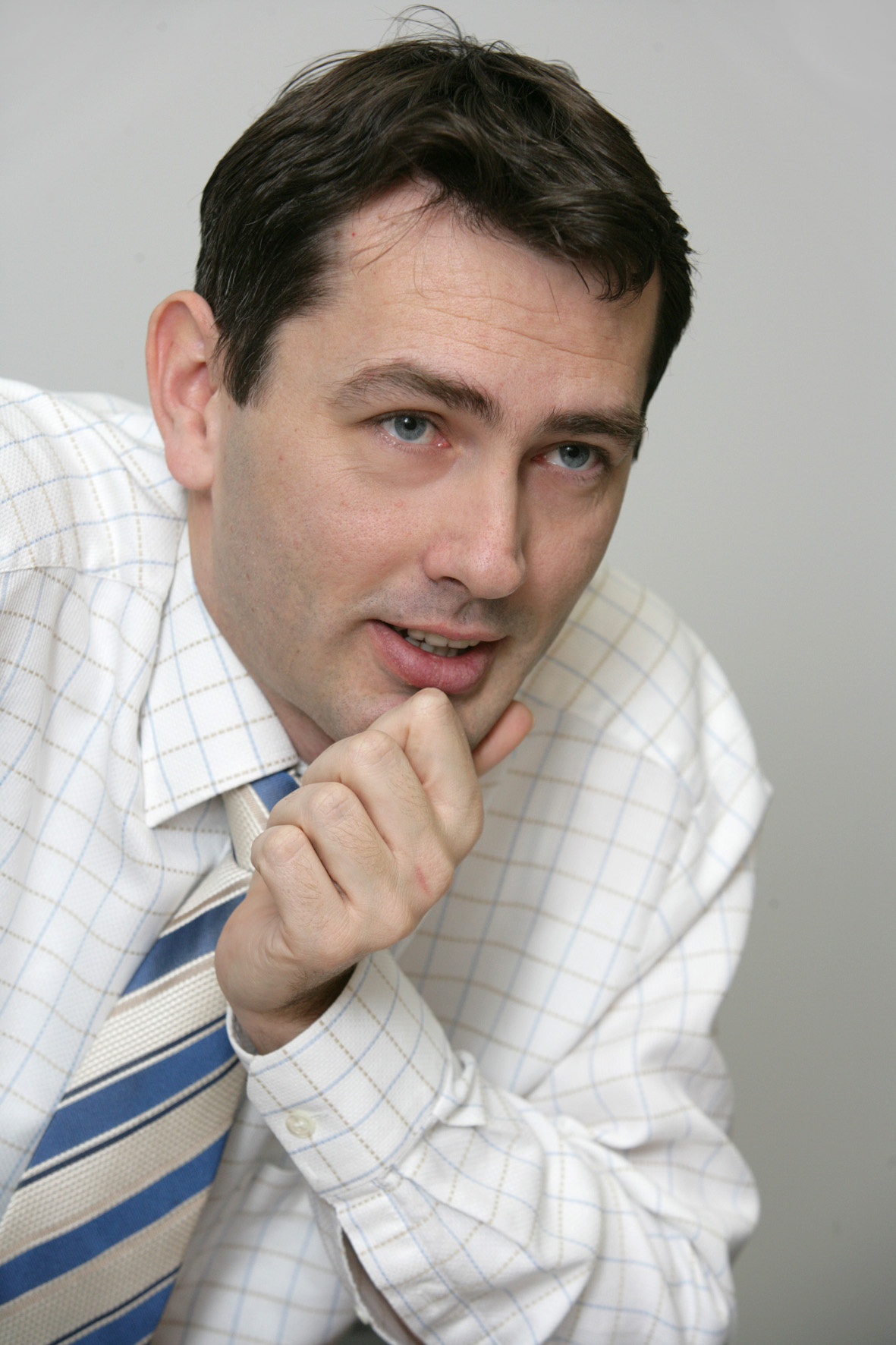

Secretary of State for Infocommunications
- In office 15 Nov 2002 – 5 June 2014
- Minister: Zsuzsanna Németh
- Preceded by: Zsolt Nyitrai
- Succeeded by: Ákos Kara

Personal details
- Born: 20 December 1971 (age 54) Miskolc, Hungary
- Children: 3
- Profession: economist

Vilmos Vályi-Nagy (born 20 December 1971 in Miskolc) was the Secretary of State for Infocommunications at the Hungarian Ministry of National Development (15 November 2012 – 5 June 2014).

== Education ==
Vályi-Nagy attended the Széchenyi István College between 1991 and 1994. He graduated as an economist on the college's Faculty of Economics. The title of his degree thesis was Privatization in East-Central Europe. He attended a correspondence training on the Business Management Faculty of University of Miskolc between 1996 and 1999 and graduated as a chartered economist. His degree thesis's title was The Integration of Customs and Excise Formalities in the EU. He speaks French and English.

== Career ==
Between 1994 and 1996 Vályi-Nagy was an officer at Hungarian State Railways (MÁV). He worked at the regional sales team in Debrecen, in the field of transportation and commerce. In March 1996 he joined the Hungarian Customs and Finance Guard (VPOP). With a grant he studied the work of the World Customs Organization in Brussels and the French Customs Administrations in Paris. In the Hungarian Customs and Finance Guard (VPOP) he held various administrative and management positions. As a leader in information technology and business management he was in charge of the following areas: analysis, international affairs, IT, finance, business management and public procurement. On the IT Department he was first an excise officer colonel but later he was appointed Deputy National Commissioner and had the rank brigadier-general.

=== Activity as State Secretary ===
On 1 June 2010 Vályi-Nagy was appointed Deputy State Secretary in the Ministry of National Development in charge of government information technology. He changed his position as a commissioned officer to become a public servant and an administration official. As Deputy State Secretary his task was to manage and regulate the government's IT center and to coordinate development programs in the field of informatics.

On 17 October 2011 Tamás Fellegi, Minister of National Development appointed him as a Ministerial Commissioner for 6 months. He coordinated the tasks connected to the Governmental Information Technology Development Agency (KIFÜ), which was established by the second Cabinet of Viktor Orbán. Since 15 November 2012 Vályi-Nagy served as the Secretary of State for Infocommunication. The position was vacant since Zsolt Nyitrai left in September 2011.

On 1 July 2013, during the period when Vályi-Nagy has been the secretary of state for infocommunications, a distance-based electronic toll system was introduced in Hungary. The State Motorway Management Company Ltd. started the public procurement process in September 2012.

In an interview in February 2014 Vályi-Nagy said that a powerful development process had started in the government informatics since the 2010 elections. Due to a development project in informatics supported by the European Union, that finished in February 2014, it is going to be possible for government and public institutions to use virtual servers in a Government Cloud, which is unique in Europe.

By the end of 2014 the capacity of supercomputers freely used by university and institutional researchers will be quadrupled. This is a 2 billion HUF project that is also subsidized by the European Union.

The National Info-communication Strategy that sets goals for the 2014–2020 period states that by 2018 every household should have internet access of at least 30 Mbit/s and at least half of them of 100 Mbit/s or faster. Another goal to reach is to enable citizens and enterprises to manage the full range of their public administration affairs online by 2018.

== Personal life ==
He is married with 3 children.

== Sources ==
- Kormány.hu: Vályi-Nagy Vilmos életrajza
- IT Business: Karrier adatlap
