= Újlőrincfalva =

- Village (község)
- Coat of arms

- Location of Heves County in Hungary

- Location in Hungary
- Coordinates: 47°37′37″N 20°36′00″E
- Country: Hungary
- Region: Northern Hungary
- County: Heves County
- District: Füzesabony
- First mentioned: 1261

Government
  - Mayor: Zsebe Zsolt (Ind.)

Area
  - Total: 48.08 km^{2} (18.56 sq mi)

Population (2015)
  - Total: 191
  - Density: 3.97/km^{2} (10.3/sq mi)
- Time zone: UTC+1 (CET)
  - Summer (DST): UTC+2 (CEST)
- Postal code: 3387
- Area code: 36
- Website: http://www.ujlorincfalva.hu/

Újlőrincfalva is a village in Heves County, Hungary.
