= Poroszló =

- Village (község)
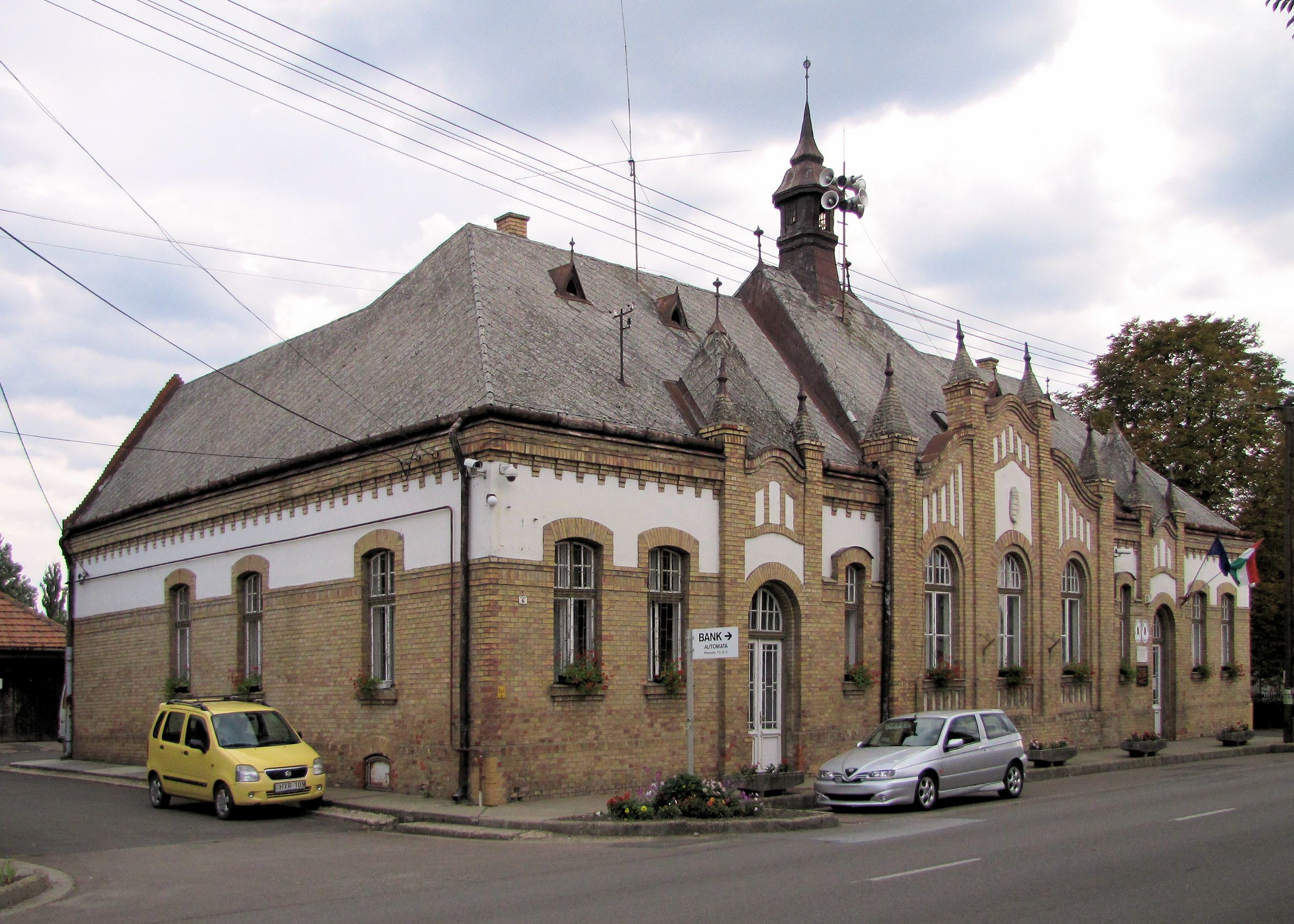
- City hall of Poroszló

- Coat of arms

- Location of Heves County in Hungary

- Location of Poroszló in Hungary
- Coordinates: 47°38′49″N 20°39′07″E
- Country: Hungary
- Region: Northern Hungary
- County: Heves County
- Subregion: Füzesabony

Government
  - Mayor: János Bornemisza

Area
  - Total: 109.04 km^{2} (42.10 sq mi)
- Elevation: 89 m (292 ft)

Population (2017)
  - Total: 2,882
  - Density: 26.43/km^{2} (68.46/sq mi)
- Time zone: UTC+1 (CET)
  - Summer (DST): UTC+2 (CEST)
- Postal code: 3388
- Area code: 36
- Website: http://poroszlo.hu/

Poroszló is a village in Heves County, Northern Hungary Region, Hungary.

== Climate ==
Poroszló's climate is classified as humid continental climate (Köppen Dfa). The annual average temperature is 10.8 °C (51.4 °F), the hottest month in July is 22.0 °C (71.6 °F), and the coldest month is −1.4 °C (29.5 °F) in January. The annual precipitation is 562.0 millimetres (22.13 in), of which July is the wettest with 79.1 millimetres (3.11 in), while January is the driest with only 26.4 millimetres (1.04 in). The extreme temperature throughout the year ranged from −22.6 °C (−8.7 °F) on January 12, 2003 to 39.5 °C (103.1 °F) on July 20, 2007.

Climate data for Poroszló, 1991−2020 normals
Month	Jan	Feb	Mar	Apr	May	Jun	Jul	Aug	Sep	Oct	Nov	Dec	Year
Record high °C (°F)	15.3 (59.5)	18.9 (66.0)	23.7 (74.7)	30.9 (87.6)	34.1 (93.4)	36.1 (97.0)	39.5 (103.1)	37.6 (99.7)	35.1 (95.2)	27.4 (81.3)	22.2 (72.0)	14.8 (58.6)	39.5 (103.1)
Mean daily maximum °C (°F)	1.7 (35.1)	4.8 (40.6)	11.1 (52.0)	17.8 (64.0)	22.7 (72.9)	26.3 (79.3)	28.4 (83.1)	28.3 (82.9)	22.6 (72.7)	16.3 (61.3)	8.9 (48.0)	2.6 (36.7)	16.0 (60.8)
Daily mean °C (°F)	−1.4 (29.5)	0.6 (33.1)	5.7 (42.3)	11.6 (52.9)	16.7 (62.1)	20.2 (68.4)	22.0 (71.6)	21.7 (71.1)	16.4 (61.5)	10.7 (51.3)	5.1 (41.2)	−0.1 (31.8)	10.8 (51.4)
Mean daily minimum °C (°F)	−3.9 (25.0)	−2.8 (27.0)	0.8 (33.4)	5.5 (41.9)	10.6 (51.1)	14.0 (57.2)	15.6 (60.1)	15.3 (59.5)	11.1 (52.0)	6.2 (43.2)	2.0 (35.6)	−2.7 (27.1)	6.0 (42.8)
Record low °C (°F)	−22.6 (−8.7)	−20.0 (−4.0)	−15.0 (5.0)	−6.7 (19.9)	−2.4 (27.7)	4.3 (39.7)	7.1 (44.8)	6.4 (43.5)	0.0 (32.0)	−9.9 (14.2)	−11.8 (10.8)	−21.4 (−6.5)	−22.6 (−8.7)
Average precipitation mm (inches)	26.4 (1.04)	32.8 (1.29)	29.3 (1.15)	40.5 (1.59)	57.7 (2.27)	61.1 (2.41)	79.1 (3.11)	54.4 (2.14)	52.8 (2.08)	47.5 (1.87)	41.4 (1.63)	39.0 (1.54)	562.0 (22.13)
Average precipitation days (≥ 1.0 mm)	5.8	6.3	5.7	6.5	8.0	8.4	8.2	6.4	6.9	6.4	6.8	7.2	82.6
Average relative humidity (%)	85.8	80.6	70.8	64.6	66.7	67.1	66.2	66.1	71.9	79.7	86.2	87.6	74.4
Source: NOAA

== Notable people ==
- László Versényi (1931–2016), actor
