= Mezőtárkány =

- Village (község)
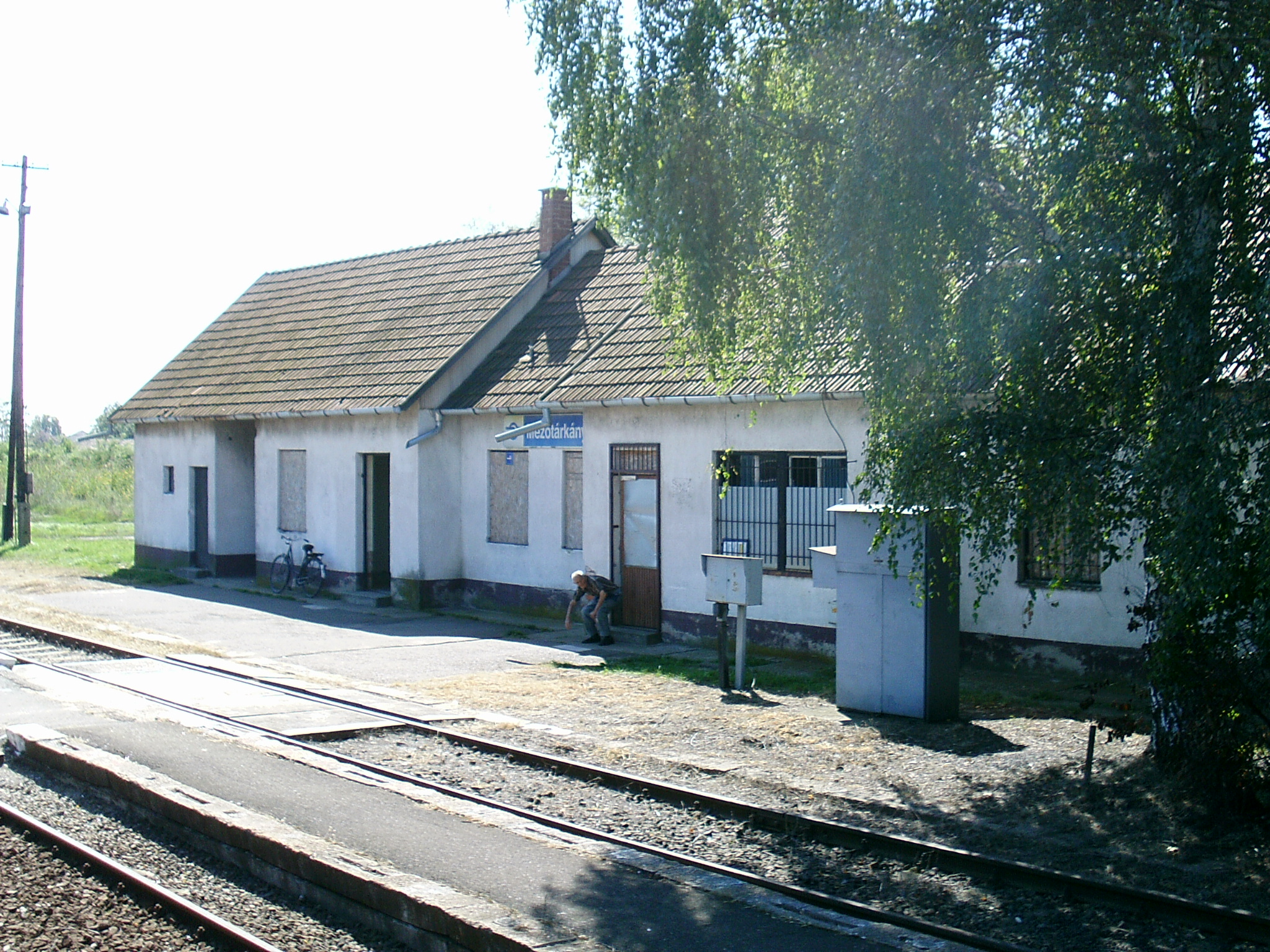
- Train station

- Flag Coat of arms

- Location of Heves County in Hungary

- Location within Hungary
- Coordinates: 47°43′16″N 20°28′34″E
- Country: Hungary
- Region: Northern Hungary
- County: Heves County
- District: Füzesabony District

Government
  - Mayor: Tóthné Szabó Anita

Area
  - Total: 40.64 km^{2} (15.69 sq mi)

Population (2015)
  - Total: 1,612
  - Density: 40/km^{2} (100/sq mi)
- Time zone: UTC+1 (CET)
  - Summer (DST): UTC+2 (CEST)
- Postal code: 3375
- Area code: 36
- Website: http://mezotarkany.hu/

Mezőtárkány is a village in Heves County, Hungary.
