= Zsolt Nyitrai =

Hungarian politician

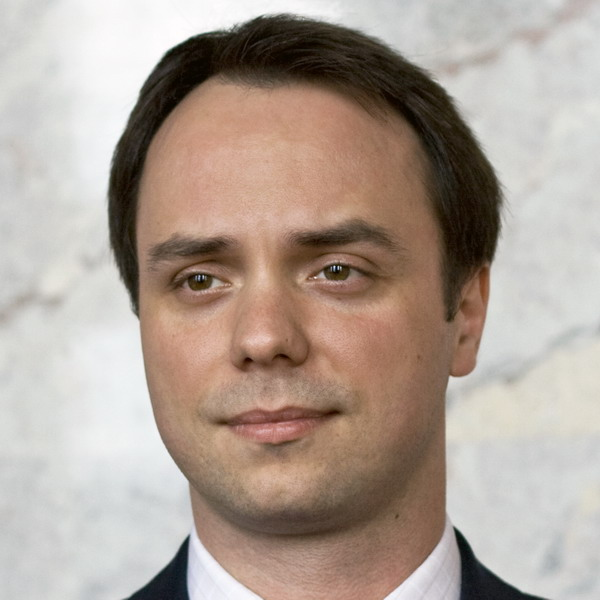

Member of the National Assembly
- In office 15 May 2002 – 8 May 2026

Secretary of State for Infocommunications
- In office 2 June 2010 – 12 September 2011
- Succeeded by: Vilmos Vályi-Nagy

Personal details
- Born: 12 April 1977 (age 49) Eger, Hungary
- Party: Fidesz (since 1994)
- Profession: politician

Zsolt Nyitrai (born April 12, 1977) is a Hungarian politician and Member of Parliament (Fidesz) from 2002 to 2026. He served as Secretary of State for Infocommunications in the Ministry of National Development between 2010 and 2011.

== Education ==
Zsolt Nyitrai went to primary school in Eger. He graduated in the Gárdonyi Géza High School. Then he got his degree in 2001 from the Law Faculty of the Miskolc University. Nyitrai speaks both English and Italian.

== Public activity ==
Zsolt Nyitrai joined Fidesz – Hungarian Civic Union in 1994. In 1998, he became chief of the campaign during the parliamentary elections in his hometown of Eger. In 1998, he was elected representative of the city council, chairing the Committee on Youth and Sport. Nyitrai also founded the first countryside-based branch of Fidelitas, the youth organization of Fidesz. In 2001, he was elected the first vice-president of the organization.

Nyitrai also served as deputy chief of the campaign during the 2004 European Parliamentary elections in 2004 that brought a landslide victory for Fidesz. Prior to the municipal elections of 2006, he was appointed as director of campaign.

Currently, Nyitrai is operational director of Fidesz. As the director he is in charge of organizing campaigns and political actions, coordinating major events, and shaping the image of the party. He is a relevant political background player in Fidesz and Fidelitas.

== Work in the Hungarian Parliament ==
In the 2002 parliamentary election, Nyitrai gained his mandate from the joint party list of MDF and Fidesz. Between 2002 and 2006, he was a member of the Committee on Law Enforcement as well as the European Integration and International Cooperation Subcommittee. The young politician submitted 210 motions in four years. As a representative he held 34 speeches which revealed unkept promises of the MSZP-SZDSZ government.

In 2006, he gained his mandate in the Heves County territorial constituency. The politician represents Fidesz-KDNP faction in the Committee on Economic Affairs and Informatics. From August 2006, Nyitrai is the chairman of Informatics and Telecommunication Working Group of Fidesz. Forty of his motions were on the agenda of the Hungarian Parliament since 2006. The floor was given to him on 11 occasions. In 2007, he became a member of the Consumer Protection Ad Hoc Committee.

In 2010, he was appointed state secretary of the Ministry of National Development. Under the Hungarian EU chairmanship, Nyitrai served as the President of the European Council of Ministers of Telecommunications. He functioned as Prime Minister's Commissioner for the Government's Human Policy between September 2011 and July 2012. In 2014, he was elected individual MP for Eger. In June 2015, he was appointed Ministerial Commissioner for Development in Heves County. He was also re-elected MP for Eger during the 2018 parliamentary election. He secured a mandate via the national list of Fidesz–KDNP during the 2022 Hungarian parliamentary election. From 10 June 2022, he assisted Viktor Orbán's work as a Prime Minister's Commissioner in the Prime Minister's Cabinet Office, his main task was to coordinate the government's activities and communication on priority social issues. After the 2026 Hungarian parliamentary election, where Fidesz–KDNP suffered a heavy defeat and fell from power, Nyitrai did not take up his mandate.
