= Szihalom =

- Village (község)
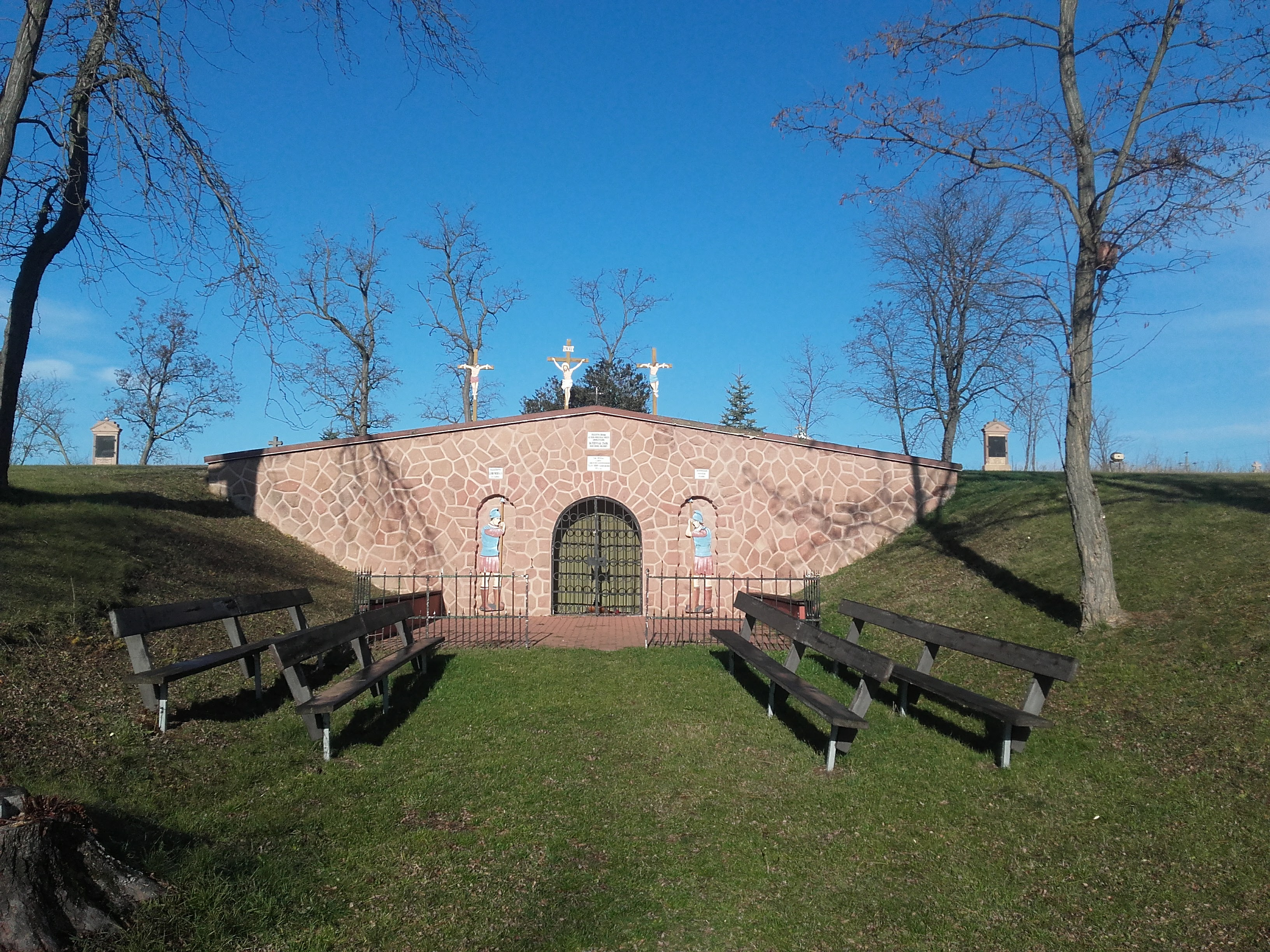

- Flag Coat of arms

- Location of Heves County in Hungary

- Location in Hungary
- Coordinates: 47°46′19″N 20°28′59″E
- Country: Hungary
- Region: Northern Hungary
- County: Heves County
- District: Füzesabony

Government
  - Mayor: Bóta József Sándor (Ind.)

Area
  - Total: 34.17 km^{2} (13.19 sq mi)

Population (2015)
  - Total: 1,899
  - Density: 55.58/km^{2} (143.9/sq mi)
- Time zone: UTC+1 (CET)
  - Summer (DST): UTC+2 (CEST)
- Postal code: 3377 3400
- Area code: 36
- Website: http://www.szihalom.hu/

Szihalom is a village in Heves County, Hungary.
