= Erzsébet Rákóczi =

Countess Erzsébet Rákóczi of Rákóczi and Felsővadász
- Coat of Arms of the Rákóczi family
- Born: November 16, 1654; Zboró
- Died: November 8, 1707 (aged 52); Szávaújvár
- Burial place: Klanjec
- Occupation: Poet
- Spouses: Count Adam Erdődy (married 1668–1668); György Erdődy (married 1670)
- Family: Rákóczi

Erzsébet Rákóczi (16 November 1654 – 8 November 1707) was a Hungarian noblewoman, poet, and letter writer . She was the daughter of Laszlo Rákóczi and Erzsebet Bánffy, the granddaughter of the judge Paul Rákóczi, and a descendant of the Catholic branch of the Rákóczi family. In 1664, after the death of her parents, she was raised by Sophie Bathory, the widow of Prince George II Rákóczi.

On 8 February 1668 she married Count Adam Erdődy, but became a widow a few months after the marriage. Two years later she married Erdődy's first cousin, Count György Erdődy (1645–1712). In the 1670s, she possibly had an affair with her friend, Paul Esterhazy. In 1685, she and her spouse had a crisis in their marriage which attracted wide attention and was the subject for court proceedings. Officially reconciled, they lived separated since then: she at her estate in Croatia, and he in Vienna.

Erzsébet Rákóczi is known for her love poems and for the letters from her correspondence with her spouse from 1672 to 1707, which are regarded as important historic documents. Those love letters were published in 2001. Also, she had an art collection, but after her death it was dispersal between several aristocratic collectors.
