= Dezső Váli =

Hungarian painter

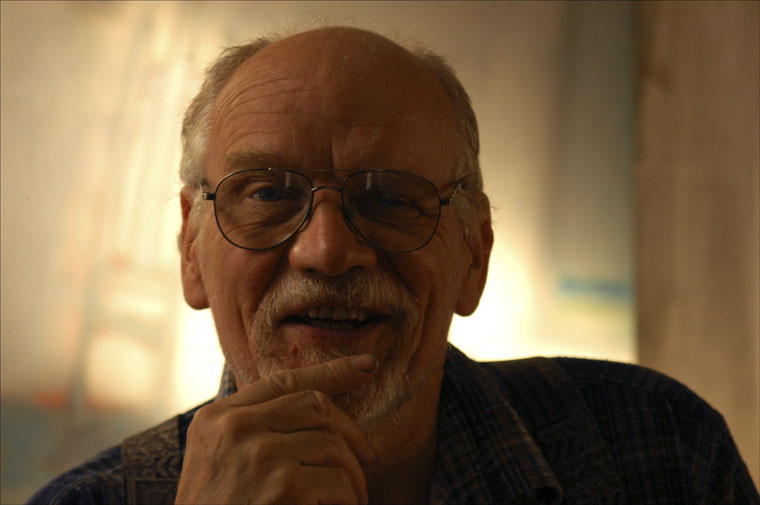
- Dezső Váli in 2003.
- Born: Dezső Váli; 2 October 1942 (age 83); Budapest, Hungary

Dezső Váli (Budapest, 2 October 1942) is a Hungarian painter.
