= Sarud =

- Village (község)
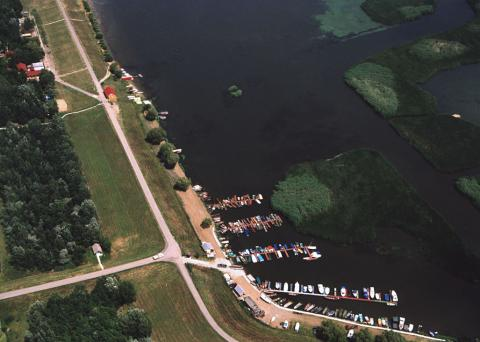

- Coat of arms

- Location of Heves County in Hungary

- Location in Hungary
- Coordinates: 47°35′42″N 20°35′24″E
- Country: Hungary
- Region: Northern Hungary
- County: Heves County
- District: Füzesabony

Government
  - Mayor: Tilcsik István (Ind.)

Area
  - Total: 51.62 km^{2} (19.93 sq mi)

Population (2015)
  - Total: 1,184
  - Density: 22.94/km^{2} (59.41/sq mi)
- Time zone: UTC+1 (CET)
  - Summer (DST): UTC+2 (CEST)
- Postal code: 3386
- Area code: 36
- Website: http://www.sarud.hu/

Sarud is a village in Heves County, Hungary.
