= Michael Friedrich von Althann =

Holy Roman clergyman and politician

His Eminence Michael Friedrich von Althann
- Cardinal-Priest of Santa Sabina
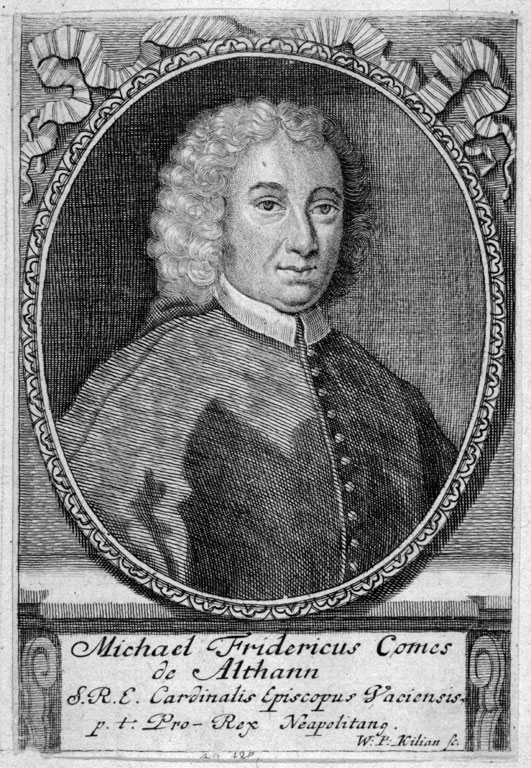
- Engraving of Cardinal von Althann, c. 1722
- Church: Catholic Church
- Appointed: 16 September 1720
- Term ended: 20 June 1734
- Predecessor: Francesco del Giudice
- Successor: Rainiero d'Elci
- Other posts: Bishop of Vác (1718-1734)

Orders
- Ordination: 1709
- Consecration: 25 July 1718 by Sigismund von Kollonitsch
- Created cardinal: 29 November 1719 by Pope Clement XI
- Rank: Cardinal-Priest

Personal details
- Born: 12 July 1680 Glatz, Prussia
- Died: 20 June 1734 (aged 53) Vác, Hungary
- Coat of arms

Michael Friedrich Graf von Althann (12 July 1680 – 20 June 1734) was a Holy Roman clergyman and politician who was the bishop of Vác (or Waitzen) and former viceroy to the Kingdom of Naples and Sicily.

== Origin and education ==
Michal Friedrich von Althann was born in Glatz, Prussia (now Kłodzko, Poland). He was the youngest son of Imperial Count Michael Wenzel von Althann (1630–1686), Landeshauptmann of the County of Kladsko, and his wife, Countess Anna Maria Elisabeth von Aspremont-Lynden (1646–1723). He attended the Jesuit College in Glatz and studied theology in Olomouc, Wrocław, and the Collegium Germanicum et Hungaricum in Rome. He was ordained a priest in 1709, and in 1710 he earned his theological doctorate, and a few years later, another doctorate. After the death of his mother, he inherited the allodial rule of Stronie Śląskie.

== Clerical offices ==
Von Althann held numerous spiritual offices. Before his priestly ordination, he became a canon of Olomouc. He also enjoyed other benefits in Prague, Breslau, Brandýs nad Labem-Stará Boleslav and Tapolca in Hungary. In 1714, he became an Austrian auditor of the Roman Rota, where he was also rector of the German priesthood, Collegio Teutonico. In 1718, he was appointed bishop of Vác in Hungary, and a year later he received the cardinal dignity with the Roman titular church Santa Sabina at Aventine Hill.

== Political offices ==
Von Althann was, from 1720 to 1722, the Imperial Austrian ambassador to the Holy See. In this position, he had the full confidence of the imperial court. He sought to improve the relations between the Roman Curia and the imperial court in Vienna and carried out a complete reorganization of the imperial embassy offices. The rise of the archdiocese of Vienna in 1722 as an archbishopric can be traced back to his negotiating abilities.

In 1722, Emperor Charles VI. appointed him to be the viceroy of Naples and Sicily, who had come to the Austrian Habsburgs in the Treaty of Utrecht as a result of the Spanish War of Succession. As a representative of the Emperor, he deposed of fealty. He was able to consolidate his authority in this office through a clever personnel policy. He encouraged the arts, theatre, music and science.

Soon he had realized, before his resignation, that he could not eliminate the political intrigues and the corruption of the elite. His dual function as a member of the Cardinal's Collegium and representatives of the imperial interests also led to several tensions with the imperial court, which were partly due to the anticlerical policies of Charles VI. From these conflicts of loyalty, his reign ended in 1728, and he returned disappointingly to the Diocese of Vác.

== Vác ==
Immediately after his appointment as Bishop of Vác, von Althann initiated the reconstruction of his diocese, which had been greatly affected by the Ottoman wars in Europe and whose administration had largely collapsed. He had a new land register created and began the diocese's visitation. He promoted the establishment of ecclesiastical orders and promoted new settlers, who had to be Catholic and came mainly from the German linguistic area, for his largely deserted and depopulated diocese.

Even after his return from Naples in 1728, he devoted himself with all his power to his diocese. In modest means, he built the episcopal residence and the priest's seminary in Vác and donated a hospital. However, by several struggles resulting from the struggle for political power in the construction of the diocese, he remained one of the sharpest critics of the imperial court, whose theocratic ambitions he rejected. For this reason, his Hungarian estates were confiscated in 1732. He died in Waitzen, Habsburg monarchy (now Vác, Hungary) in 1734 and was buried in the cathedral of Vác. His nephew, Michael Karl von Althann, became his successor as bishop.
