= Füzesabony =

- Town
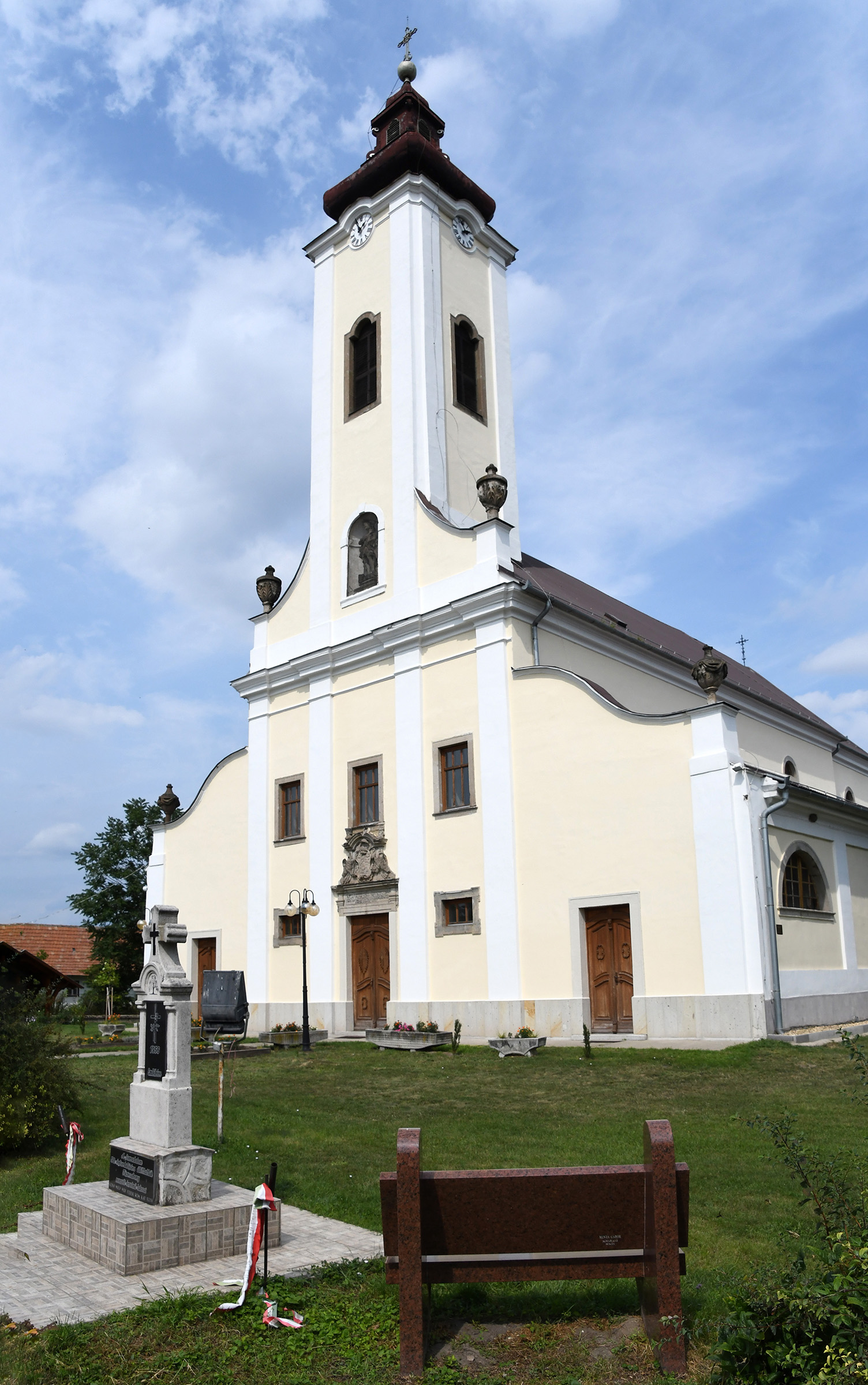
- Roman Catholic church in Füzesabony

- Flag Coat of arms

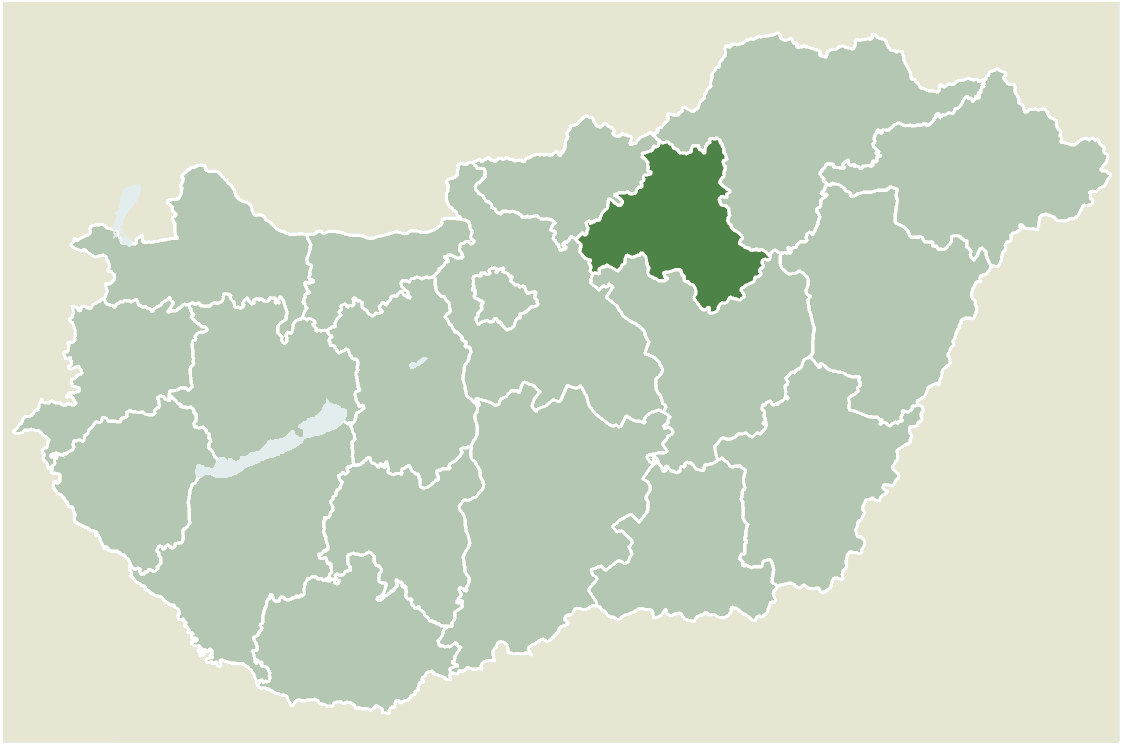
- Location of Heves county in Hungary

- Location of Füzesabony
- Coordinates: 47.751°N 20.409°E
- Country: Hungary
- County: Heves
- District: Füzesabony

Area
  - Total: 46.34 km^{2} (17.89 sq mi)

Population (2001)
  - Total: 8,335
  - Density: 179.87/km^{2} (465.9/sq mi)
- Time zone: UTC+1 (CET)
  - Summer (DST): UTC+2 (CEST)
- Postal code: 3390
- Area code: (+36) 36
- Website: www.fuzesabony.hu

Füzesabony is a Hungarian town in the eastern part of Heves County, on the northern edge of the Great Plain. It is the center of Füzesabony District. It is a railway and road transport hub.

== History ==
The area was inhabited in prehistoric times, and the evidence of this is now preserved in the Hungarian National Museum. Neolithic settlements were excavated by archaeologists in the area called Szikszói berek near Füzesabony-Gubakút and Pusztaszikszó, as well as near the sewage plant, in 1995–96, and in 1997 and 2005 to 2006. Later, Celts and Sarmatians also inhabited it. The settlement is first mentioned in 1261, as Obon. It was destroyed by the Ottomans in the year of the Siege of Eger (1552), but was quickly repopulated.

The construction of the railway line between Miskolc and Hatvan began in 1869. In 1872, a railway line connected the settlement with Eger and in 1891 with Debrecen, which thus developed the town into an important railway junction in the region.

The town received city status in 1989.

== Population ==
As 2022 of, 92.3% of the population identified themselves as Hungarian, 3.1% as Roma, 0.4% as German, 0.2% as Ukrainian, 0.1% as Croat, 0.1% as Romanian, 1.6% as other non-domestic nationality (7.6% did not declare; due to double identities, the total may be greater than 100%).

As of 2022 the religion demographics of the town were: 38% Roman Catholic, 3.1% as Calvinist, 0.4% as Greek Catholic, 0.1% as Evangelical, 0.1% as Orthodox, 1.7% as other Christian, 0.7% as other Catholic, 15.1% as non-denominational (40.6% did not respond).

== Notable people ==
- Football player Sándor Bíró was born here on August 9, 1911.
- Gellért Belon, auxiliary bishop of Pécs , was born here on September 24, 1911.
- Dr. István Gál, a Piarist priest and teacher, was born here on February 8, 1913.
- Hungarian Minister of Defense, János Szabó was born here on June 1, 1941 .
- Sándor Holczreiter, Olympic bronze medalist and three-time world champion weightlifter, was born here on July 18, 1946.
- Singer Zsuzsa Koncz spent her early childhood here.

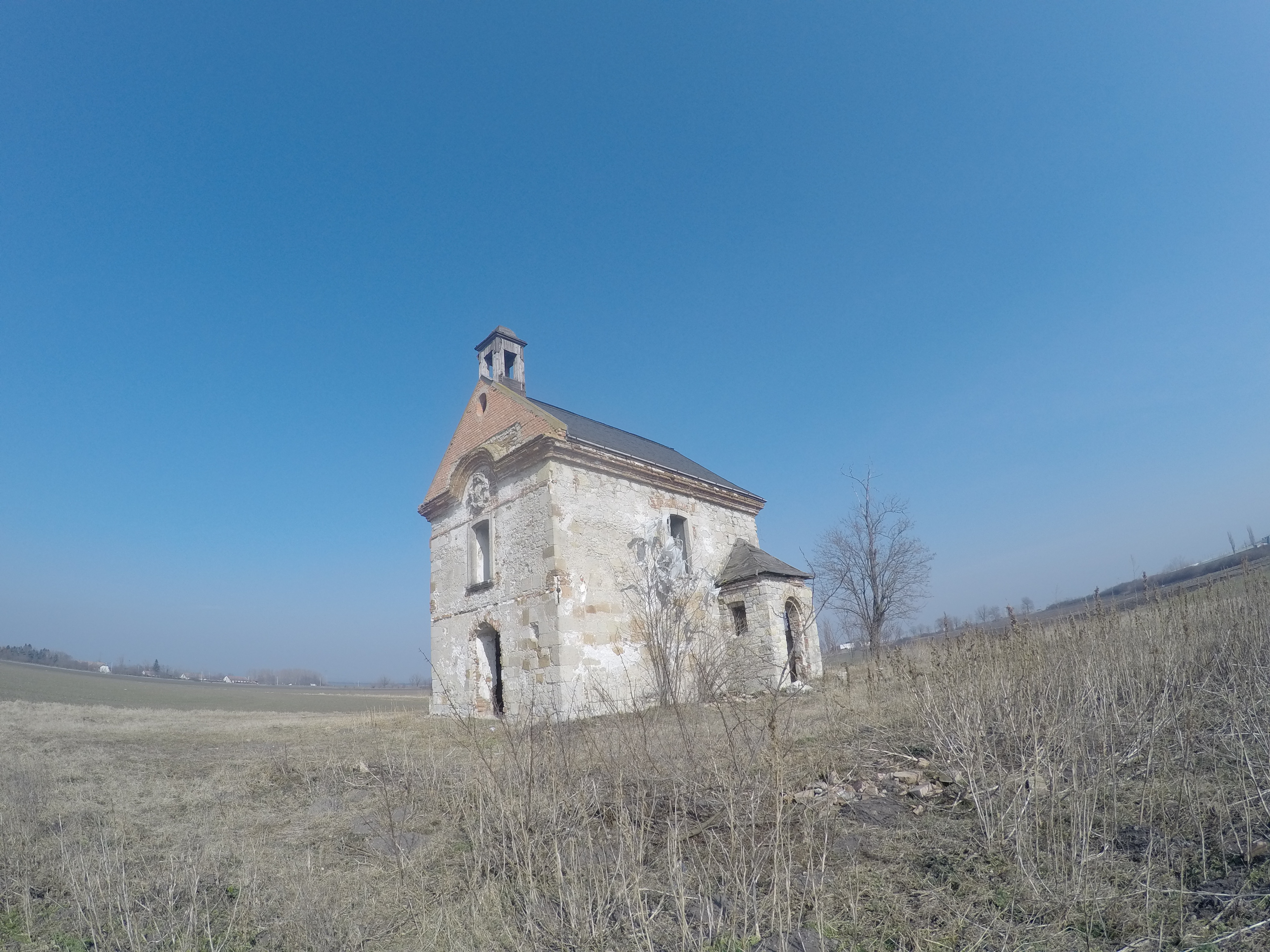
Abandoned chapel just outside Füzesabony
