= Mezőszemere =

- Village (község)
- Location of Heves County in Hungary

- Location in Hungary
- Coordinates: 47°44′46″N 20°31′08″E
- Country: Hungary
- Region: Northern Hungary
- County: Heves County
- District: Füzesabony

Government
  - Mayor: Bukta Mária (Ind.)

Area
  - Total: 21.48 km^{2} (8.29 sq mi)

Population (2015)
  - Total: 1,180
  - Density: 54.9/km^{2} (142/sq mi)
- Time zone: UTC+1 (CET)
  - Summer (DST): UTC+2 (CEST)
- Postal code: 3378
- Area code: 36
- Website: http://www.mezoszemere.hu/

Mezőszemere is a village in Heves County, Hungary.
