= Battle of Mezőkövesd =

Battle during Hungarian Revolution of 1848

Coordinates: 47°47′46.3″N 20°35′05.9″E

- Part of the Hungarian Revolution of 1848
Date	28 February 1849
Location	Mezőkövesd, Szihalom Borsod-Abaúj-Zemplén County, Kingdom of Hungary
Result	Hungarian victory

Belligerents
Hungarian Revolutionary Army	Austrian Empire

Commanders and leaders
György Kmety; András Gáspár	Franz Deym von Stritež

Strength
~1,000 hussars 29 cannons	~1,000 cuirassiers 6 cannons

Casualties and losses
Unknown	9 dead 49 wounded 29 captured 56 horses 2–4 cannons 2 ammunition wagons

The Battle of Mezőkövesd was a battle in the Hungarian war of Independence of 1848-1849, fought on 30 October 1848 between the cavalry of the Hungarian revolutionary Army led by Colonel András Gáspár and Lieutenant Colonel György Kmety against the cavalry of the Austrian Empire led by Major General Franz Deym von Stritež, which attacked the retreating Hungarian main army's rearguard formed by the Kmety division, retreating after the lost Battle of Kápolna from 26 to 27 February. The Hungarian hussars and artillery put the Austrian cavalry to flight. This victory gave a moral boost to the Hungarians and shook the overconfidence of the Austrian main commander Field Marshal Alfred I, Prince of Windisch-Grätz who reported after the Battle of Kápolna, that he scattered them and destroyed the rebellious hordes, and that he will capture the nest of the rebellion, Debrecen in a few days.

== Prelude ==
After the Battle of Kápolna, the commander of the Hungarian army, Lieutenant General Henryk Dembiński decided to continue the retreat and issued an order for the army to concentrate at Mezőkövesd on 28 February. Some sub-commanders, especially General Artúr Görgei and Lieutenant Colonel György Kmety, were in favor of resuming the battle, but Dembiński, sticking to his original intention, had the divisions that reached Mezőkövesd at noon encamped between the town and the Kánya stream as follows: north of the main road, the Aulich, Guyon and Pöltenberg divisions; south of the main road, the Dessewffy, Máriássy and Szekulics divisions. The Bátori-Schulcz division seems to have remained in the vicinity of Eger. Kmety's division remained in its position on the Kerecsend heights until noon on the 28th, and then, following the other divisions as a rearguard, also headed for Mezőkövesd.

Görgei describes the choice of the place of the encampment as another mistake by Dembiński, who was credited by most of the Hungarian military leaders as responsible for the defeat at Kápolna: When Dembiński chose this location for the camp, he probably listened to his obsession that the enemy was satisfied with our retreat to Mezőkövesd for the time being and would not bother us that day. This obsession was further underlined by the fact that he neither set up a further line of retreat nor issued orders in case of an enemy attack. So we [meaning here especially Dembiński] did our utmost to ensure that if the enemy struck us in broad daylight, he would not fail.

Fortunately for Dembiński, the Imperials were also tired after the Battle of Kápolna, so they pursued the retreating troops at a slow pace.

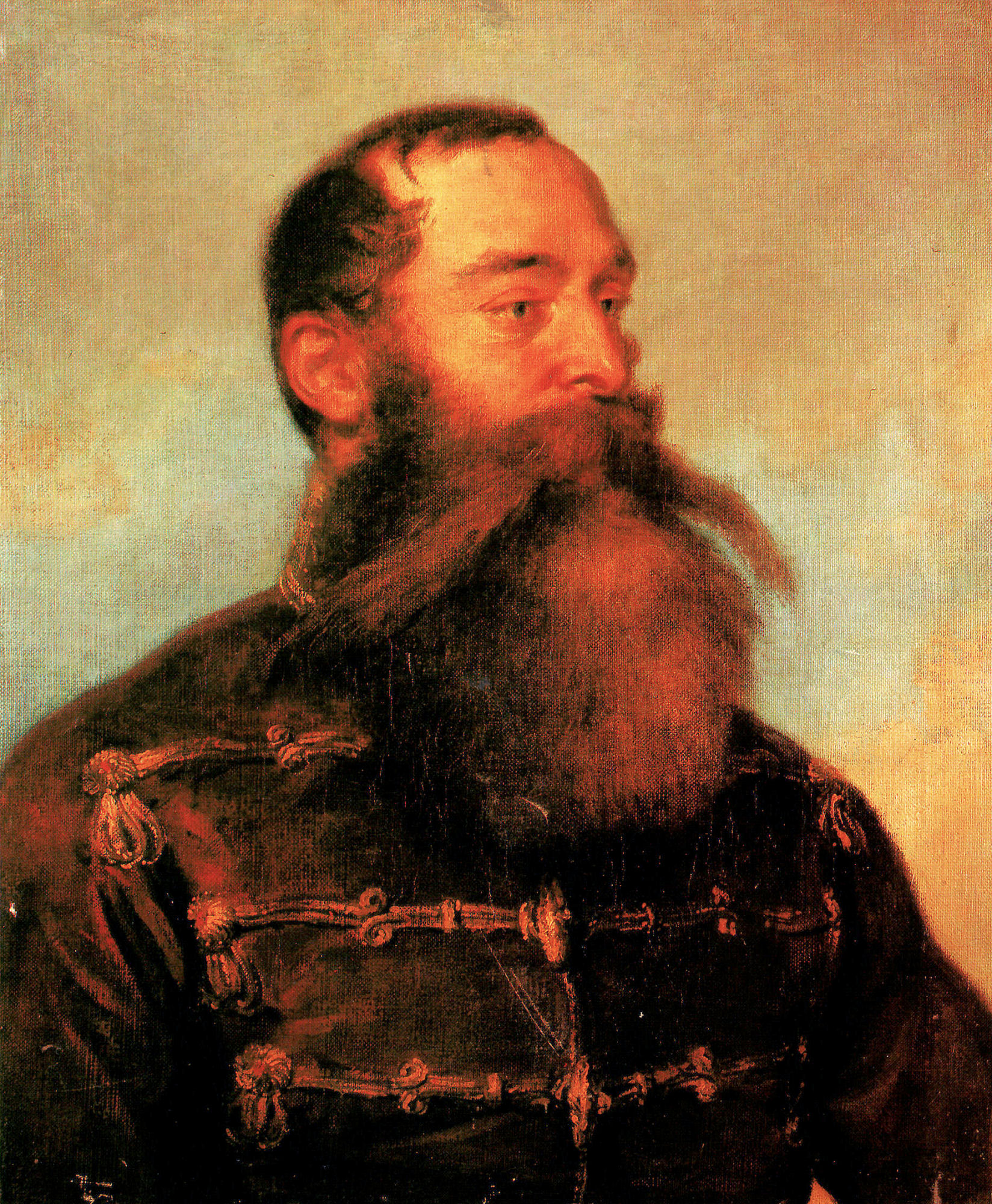
Kmety György

The order issued by Windischgrätz for 28 February essentially contained the following: both corps would start to pursue the enemy at 7 a.m., Schlick's corps with Csorich's division through Kerecsend, Schwarzenbeg's division through Füzesabony. The Lieutenant General Karl Zeisberg, the leader of a detachment received the following order at half past eleven at night: The corps of Lieutenant-General Count [Franz] Schlick and Lieutenant-General [Ladislaus von] Wrbna will advance towards Kerecsend and Füzesabony at about 7 o'clock tomorrow morning. From this point, the roads will branch off towards Eger, Mezőkövesd, and Poroszló, and so only from here can be determined the direction in which the enemy will be pursued. Your Excellency's task remains to secure my right flank towards Heves and Poroszló...

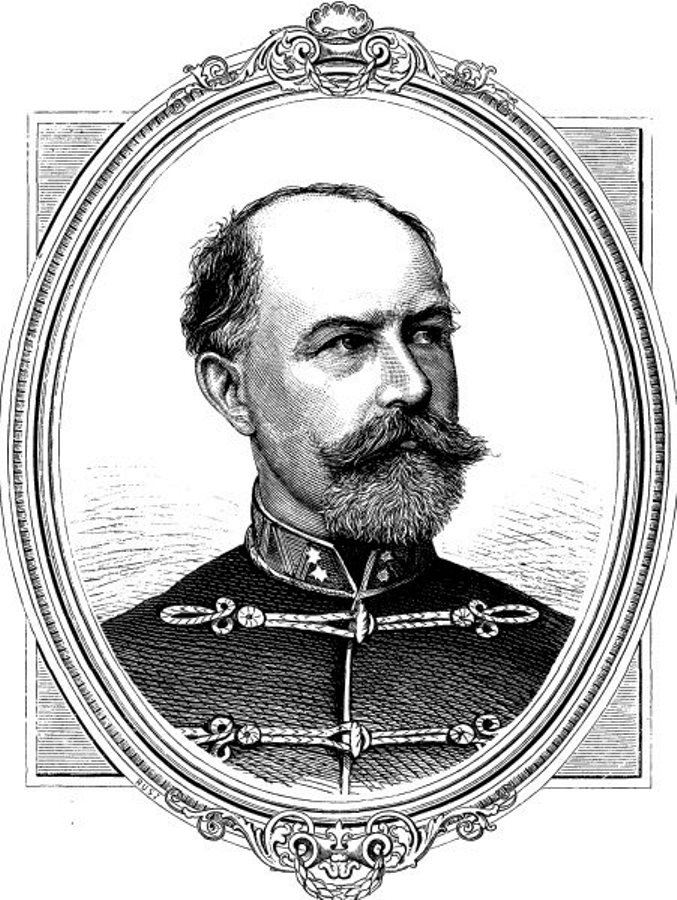
Görgey Kornél

Before 7 o'clock on the morning of the 28th, Schlick sent a report to the high commander of the imperial army, Field Marshal Alfred I, Prince of Windisch-Grätz that the position at Kerecsend was strongly occupied by the enemy, and that he was of the opinion that attacking it would be very difficult. Windischgrätz then rode forward personally to inspect the position at Kerecsend, where only the rearguard of Kmety's division was left, which soon withdrew as well. Windisch-grätz decided to send Csorich's division through Kerecsend to Maklár, where he would wait for the arrival of the Friedler and Kriegern brigades. From Maklár, the cavalry under Major General Franz Deym von Stritež's command was to be moved forward so that it would always be on the enemy's heels. The Pergen brigade was ordered to remain in its camp until it was certain that the enemy had abandoned Eger, after which this brigade was also ordered to march to Maklár. The army's ammunition supply was directed from Gyöngyös to Kápolna under the cover of the Parrot Brigade.

The Schwarzenberg and Csorich divisions reached Füzesabony and Maklár, quite late, only at noon. Here Csorich, in accordance with his orders, halted with the infantry to wait for Schlick, who did not arrive until the afternoon, while he sent General Deym on to pursue the enemy with 7 companies of cavalry and 9 cannons. Colonel William Albert, 1st Prince of Montenuovo, with the rest of the cavalry, initially advanced along the route of Deym's detachment but later turned back towards Eger.

== Battle ==
At first, Deym followed Kmety only at a greater distance on the Maklár plain, but when the latter was about to cross the Ostoros stream halfway between Szihalom and Mezőkövesd the bulk of Deym's cavalry, under the command of Major Gablenz, went on the attack, while also fiercely firing with their 4 cannons at the Hungarians. The attack occurred some 3000 paces in front of the Hungarian camp, out of the range of the guns, which put Kmety's troops in an even more difficult position. and the attack of the cuirassiers (Note: The memoirs of some soldiers and lower officers speak also about Austrian chevau-légers, dragoons and uhlans participating in the battle, but Deym’s cavalry brigade consisted only of 7 cuirassier companies and 9 cannons.) confused and disordered so much the Kmety division, that one of his batteries made a frantic run to escape from the pursuers; but when the battery reached the Hungarian camp, Görgei was so enraged by this, that he threatened the coward battery commander with death, then sent them back again in the battle. According to Görgei's memoir, when the attack occurred, he went to Dembiński, who was having lunch, but hearing about the attack, he immediately headed for the camp.

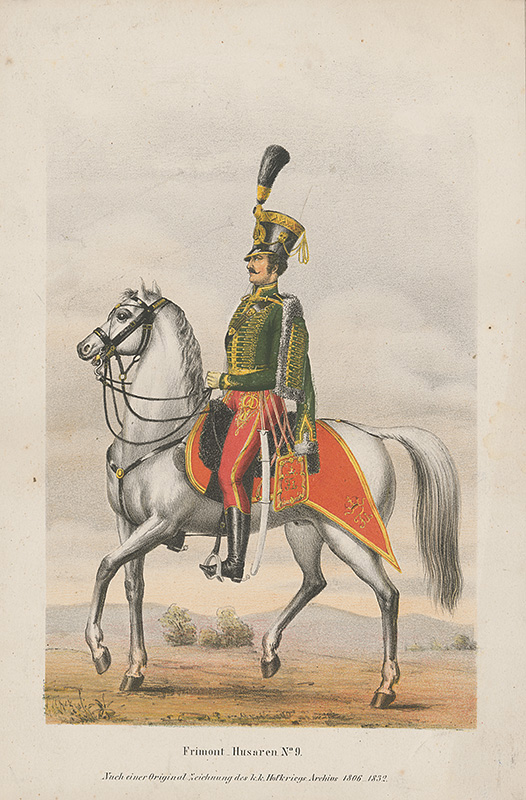
Hungarian 9th Hussar Regiment's officer, before 1831

The sound of the cannonade soon alarmed the divisions from the camp, of which the Aulich and Guyon divisions were the first to prepare for counter-attack. The cavalry of the Kmety, Guyon and Aulich divisions were waiting for their commanders in order, and, with Poeltenberg's division returning from one of their attacks, they went on the attack on the right flank. The first help to Kmety was provided by a detachment of the Nicholas Hussars, under the command of Colonel András Gáspár. Opposing him was his former commander, but there were several other officers of the Imperial Cavalry too who had been his comrades back in 1848. Kmety's division was joined in the attack by one company of Hunyadi Hussars and 4 companies of Wilhelm the Hussar. At the same time as the attack began, the cavalry battery also advanced, and its six guns, along the highway, began to fire successfully at the enemy. In the meantime, the Hungarian hussars, with the Nicholas hussars on the right and the Wilhelm hussars on the left, attacked the cuirassiers.

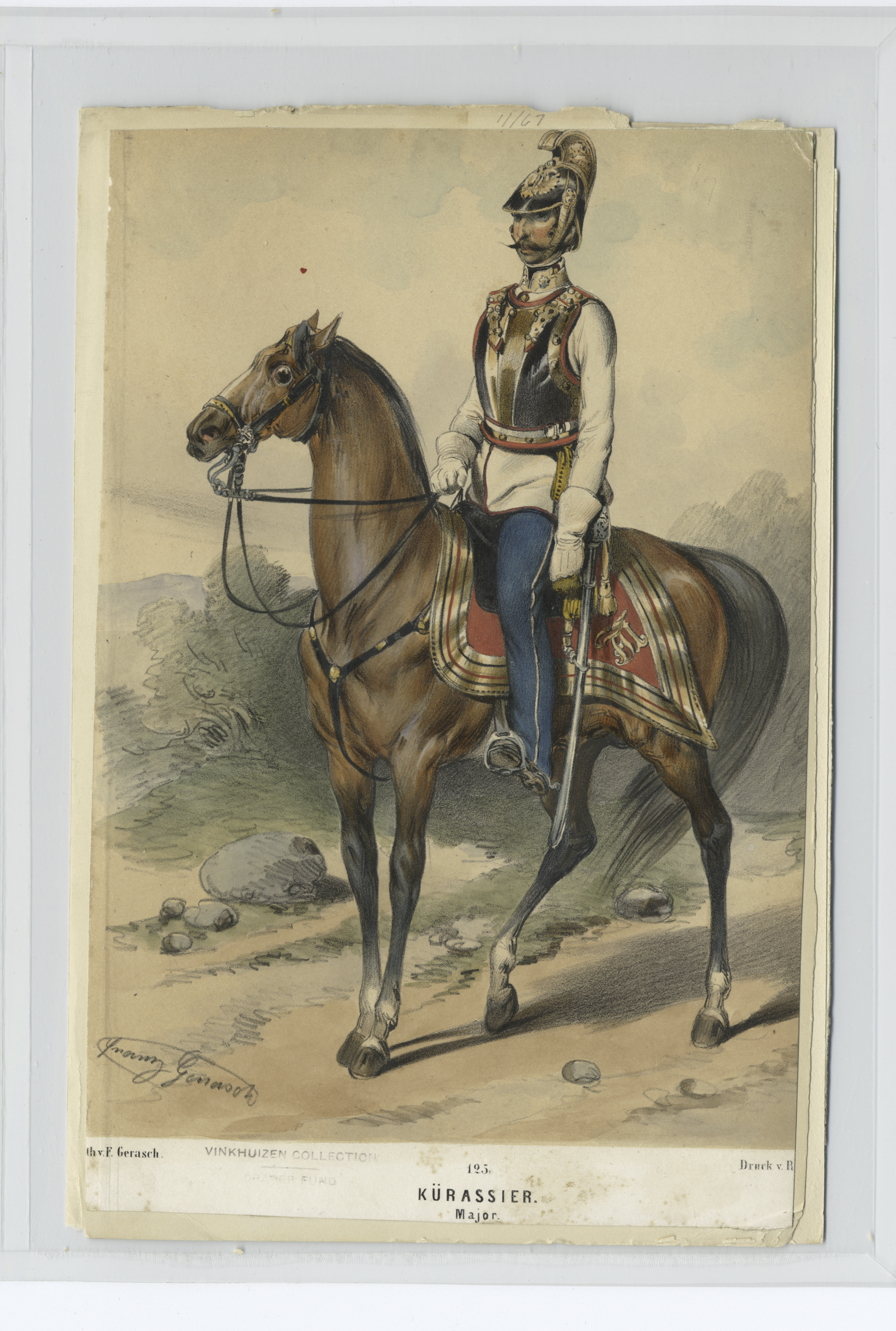
Cuirassier, Major 1854

To the left of the highway, Kmethy's Wilhelm Hussars attacked the enemy cavalry just as they were attacking the Hungarian guns. The Hungarian hussars attacking from the front broke through the enemy cavalry's battle line, then attacked them from the front and from the rear. Colonel György Klapka, watching the cavalry fight from the Hungarian camp, describes it as follows: It was a magnificent sight to see this light cavalry group reach the heavy cuirassiers in an instant, break through their ranks and partly cut them off, partly scattered them in all directions. Other Hungarian cavalry units also wanted to join the battle, but by the time they reached the battle site, the fighting was over. After chasing away the cuirassiers, the two squadrons (4 companies) of the 9th Hussars regiment, led by Major Kornél Görgey (one of Artúr Görgei's brothers), flanked the Austrian battery firing at the Hungarian center and captured 2 (according to other sources 3 or 4) guns together with the horses and artillerymen. Afterward, the cuirassiers who had been driven back towards Szihalom, simply looked at some Hungarian Hussars struggling with the guns of the Austrian half-battery taken from them by the 9th Hussar Regiment, trying to bring them to the Hungarian front line. They were probably so frightened by the Hungarian attack that they did not dare to risk recovering the cannons.

Encouraged by the successful cavalry charge, the Hungarian soldiers and generals together wanted to launch an immediate attack against the Austrian army. Like, like Artúr Görgei's other brother, István Görgey writes: And at the next moment, before my brother Arthur could give any orders, the whole Hungarian army, with an involuntary movement, advanced in a frontal march as one man... I have never witnessed a more magnificent, more inspiring sight! Dembiński, however, did not want to hear about it, he was angry, and he cursed; according to Artur Görgei, he was annoyed by the successful Hungarian attack, which he called nonsense, he even objected to the capture of the Austrian guns, threatening Kornél Görgey with execution through a headshot, and forbade any further attacks.

In addition to Dembiński's ban, the stopping of further pursuit was also influenced by the appearance in the distance of the Montenuovo Brigade on the Hungarian Hussars' right flank. Deym's scattered detachment rallied at the imperial infantry at Maklár and Füzesabony; neither Schwarzenberg nor Csorich attempted to retake the lost guns. During the afternoon, both Austrian corps concentrated around Maklár and set up camp near this place.

== Aftermath ==
Most of the Hungarian corps and division commanders urged the continuation of the offensive advance. Dembiński, not consenting to this, kept the battle-ready divisions in their positions under arms until the evening; but seeing that the enemy did not attack, he ordered the troops to settle in the former camps, which the Kmety division had to secure by setting up an advance party.

During the Hungarian counter-attack, Deym lost 9 dead and 49 wounded soldiers, among them Major Prince Holstein, 29 prisoners, including an officer, 56 horses, 2-4 guns, and 2 ammunition wagons. As for the Hungarian losses, Bertalan Szemere, the government commissioner for Upper Hungary, who was present in the camp, wrote that only a few hussars were wounded, among them two officers received minor wounds. Captain István Görgey, on the other hand, writes of many Hungarians who were wounded, in whom the swords of the cuirassiers inflicted many grievous wounds. One of the hussars, Captain Albert Schmidt, had received 19 wounds and lay on the ground in a near-death condition until his comrades found him and took him to a medic, who saved his life. Another hussar officer, Major August Thomstorff of Holsteinian origin, who led a company of Hunyadi Hussars, during the battle suddenly recognized a prince of his own country among the Austrian cuirassiers, and to save him from the wrath of the Hussars, he defended him with his own body from the attacking Hussars, and for this, he received sword cuts not only from the cuirassiers but also from his Hungarian comrades. István Görgey tells about the death of Géza Udvarnoky, a hussar from a noble family, who was a member of the Hungarian Royal Guards in the years before the Revolution, and here he became friends with György Klapka. Drunk with wine, Udvarnoky, swearing, attacked the officers, and was tried to be held down by the hussars, but he continued his violent behavior. When asked about what to do with him, because of his noble origin, István Görgey forbade the hussars to hit him, but in case he tried to escape, he told them to shoot him. This was done when Udvarnoky actually tried to escape.

The retreat to Tiszafüred led to a serious crisis of confidence in the army regarding Dembiński, so István Görgey asked the question:

Is this the man who will lead us to victory? Is this the man who will lead our country's cause?

In the campaign culminating with the Battle of Kápolna, Windisch-Grätz achieved only one result, the Hungarian main army retreated behind the Tisza River. The military initiative was out of the hands of both sides, so it was impossible to know which would attack first. The failure in the Battle of Mezőkövesd led to Deym's dismissal: Windisch-Grätz replaced him.

== Sources ==
- Babucs, Zoltán (2023), ""Soh sem voltam ennél magasztosabb, lelkesitőbb látvány szemtanúja!" Utóvédharc Mezőkövesdnél, 1849. február 28-án ("I have never witnessed a more magnificent, more inspiring sight!" Reargard Action at Mezőkövesd on 28 February 1849)", Magyarságkutató Intézet (27 February 2023) (in Hungarian), archived from the original on 19 May 2023
- Bánlaky, József (2001). A magyar nemzet hadtörténelme (The Military History of the Hungarian Nation) (in Hungarian). Budapest: Arcanum Adatbázis.
- Bóna, Gábor, ed. (1999). The Hungarian Revolution and War of Independence. A Military History. War and Society in East Central Europe. Vol. XXXV. Translated by Arató, Nóra. Atlantic Research and Publications, Inc. ISBN 0-88033-433-9.
- "Szihalom-Mezőkövesdi csata 1849-ben (Battle of Szihalom-Mezőkövesd in 1849)".
- Görgey, Artúr (2004). Életem és működésem Magyarországon 1848-ban és 1849-ben- Görgey István fordítását átdolgozta, a bevezetőt és a jegyzeteket írta Katona Tamás (My Life and Activity in Hungary in 1848 and in 1849). István Görgey's translation was revised by Tamás Katona, and also he wrote the Introduction and the Notes. Neumann Kht.
- Hermann, Róbert (2013). Nagy csaták. 15. A magyar önvédelmi háború ("Great Battles. 15. The Hungarian War od Self Defense") (in Hungarian). Budapest: Duna Könyvklub. p. 88. ISBN 978-615-5013-99-7.
