= Eger District =

Coordinates: 47.9000°N 20.3667°E

Eger District Egri járás
- Districts of Hungary
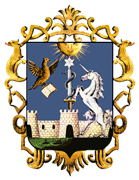
- Coat of arms

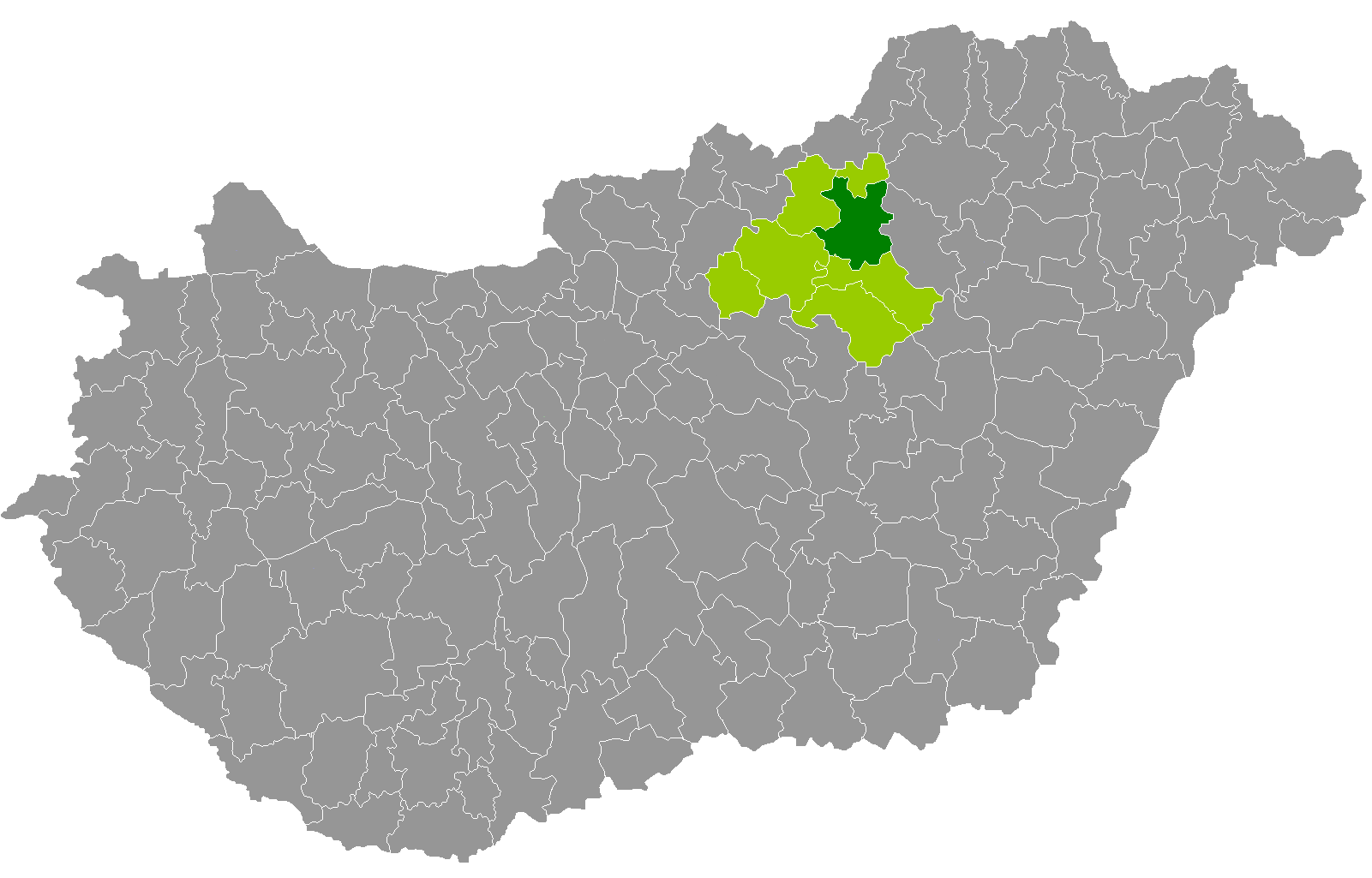
- Eger District within Hungary and Heves County.
- Country: Hungary
- County: Heves
- District seat: Eger

Area
  - Total: 602.05 km^{2} (232.45 sq mi)
  - Rank: 3rd in Heves

Population (2011 census)
  - Total: 87,939
  - Rank: 1st in Heves
  - Density: 146/km^{2} (380/sq mi)

Eger (Hungarian: Egri járás) is a district in eastern part of Heves County. Eger is also the name of the town where the district seat is found. The district is located in the Northern Hungary Statistical Region. This district lies between of Bükk Mountains and Mátra Mountains geographical region.

== Geography ==
Eger District borders with Bélapátfalva District to the north, Mezőkövesd District (Borsod-Abaúj-Zemplén County) to the east, Füzesabony District to the south, Gyöngyös District and Pétervására District to the west. The number of the inhabited places in Eger District is 22.

== Municipalities ==
The district has 1 urban county, 1 town and 20 villages. (ordered by population, as of 1 January 2012)

- Andornaktálya (2,740)
- Bátor (407)
- Demjén (590)
- **Eger** (56,166) – district and county seat
- Egerbakta (1,434)
- Egerbocs (531)
- Egercsehi (1,377)
- Egerszalók (1,886)
- Egerszólát (1,062)
- Feldebrő (1,021)
- Felsőtárkány (3,358)
- Hevesaranyos (582)
- Kerecsend (2,304)
- Maklár (2,398)
- Nagytálya (844)
- Noszvaj (1,857)
- Novaj (1,390)
- Ostoros (2,670)
- Szarvaskő (385)
- Szúcs (401)
- Tarnaszentmária (225)
- **Verpelét** (3,812)

The bolded municipalities are cities.

== Demographics ==
Religion in Eger District (2011 census)
1. Catholic Church (45.4%)
2. Greek Catholicism (0.50%)
3. Calvinism (6.00%)
4. Lutheranism (0.30%)
5. Other religions (1.70%)
6. Non-religious (15.8%)
7. Atheists (1.70%)
8. Undeclared (28.6%)

In 2011, it had a population of 87,939 and the population density was 146/km^{2}.

Year	County population	Change
2011	87,939	n/a

=== Ethnicity ===
Besides the Hungarian majority, the main minorities are the Roma (approx. 4,000), German (600), Romanian (150) and Slovak (100).

Total population (2011 census): 87,939
Ethnic groups (2011 census): Identified themselves: 80,504 persons:

- Hungarians: 74,703 (92.79%)
- Gypsies: 3,712 (4.61%)
- Others and indefinable: 2,089 (2.59%)

Approx. 7,500 persons in Eger District did not declare their ethnic group at the 2011 census.

=== Religion ===
Religious adherence in the county according to 2011 census:

- Catholic – 40,397 (Roman Catholic – 39,948; Greek Catholic – 441);
- Reformed – 5,241;
- Evangelical – 281;
- other religions – 1,501;
- Non-religious – 13,897;
- Atheism – 1,465;
- Undeclared – 25,157.

== Gallery ==
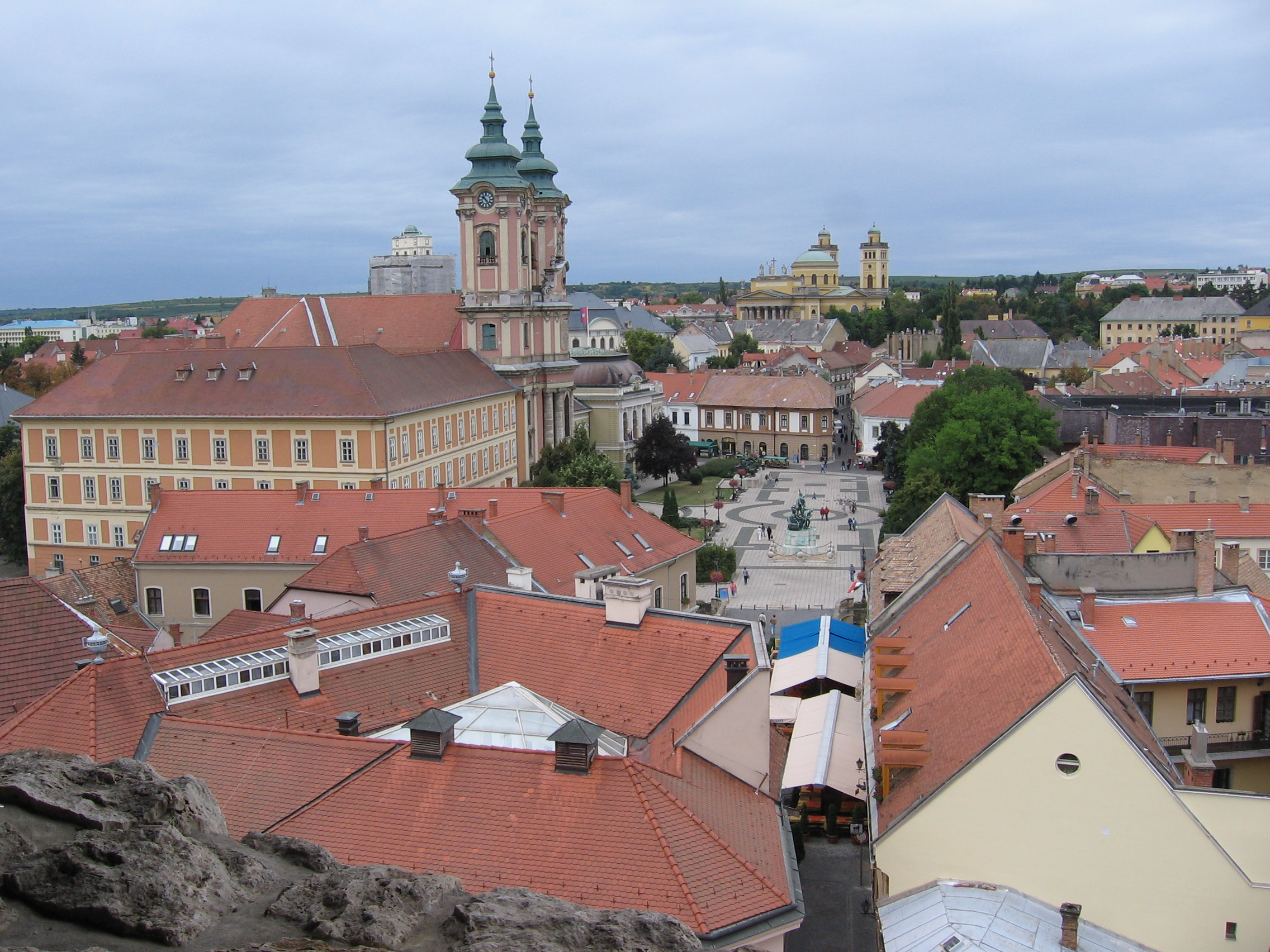
Eger, the Hungarian Athens

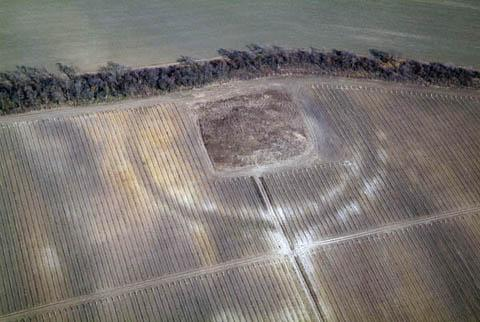
Earthwork of Verpelét

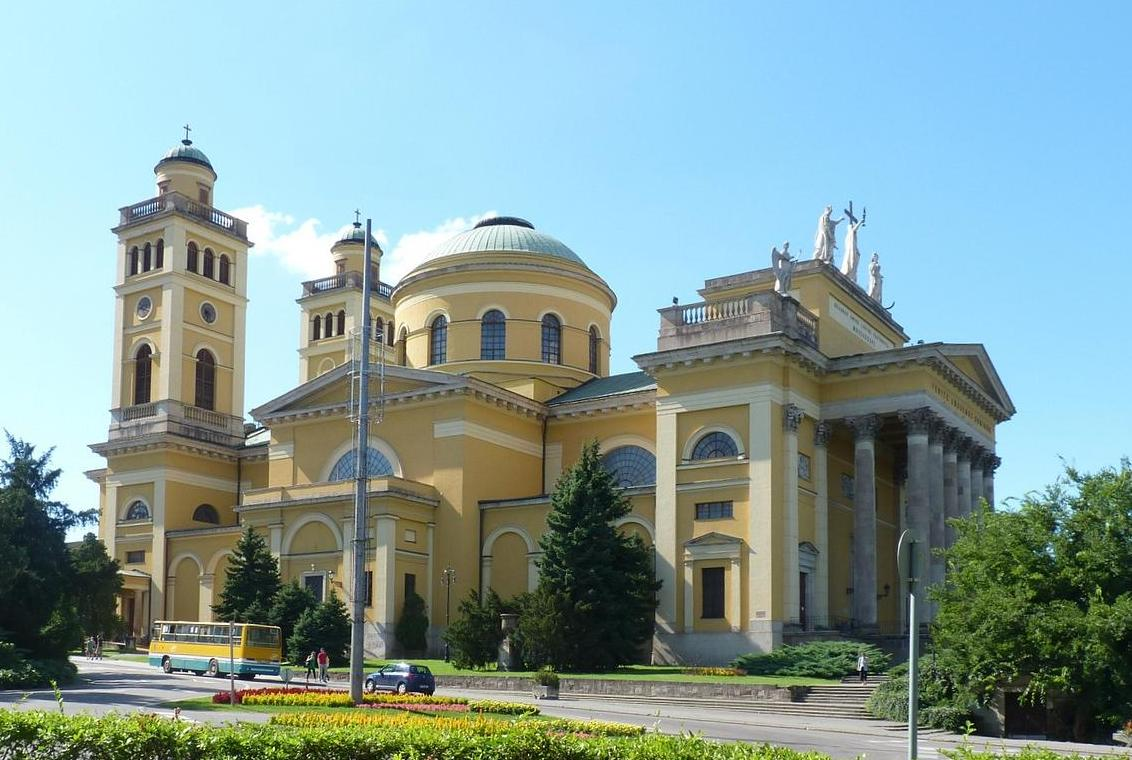
Cathedral Basilica of St. John the Apostle in Eger

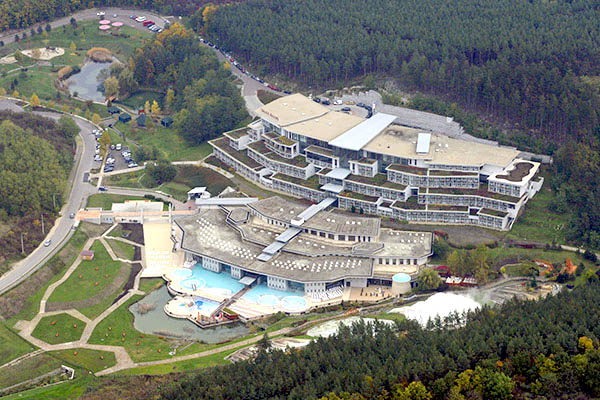
Spa in Egerszalók

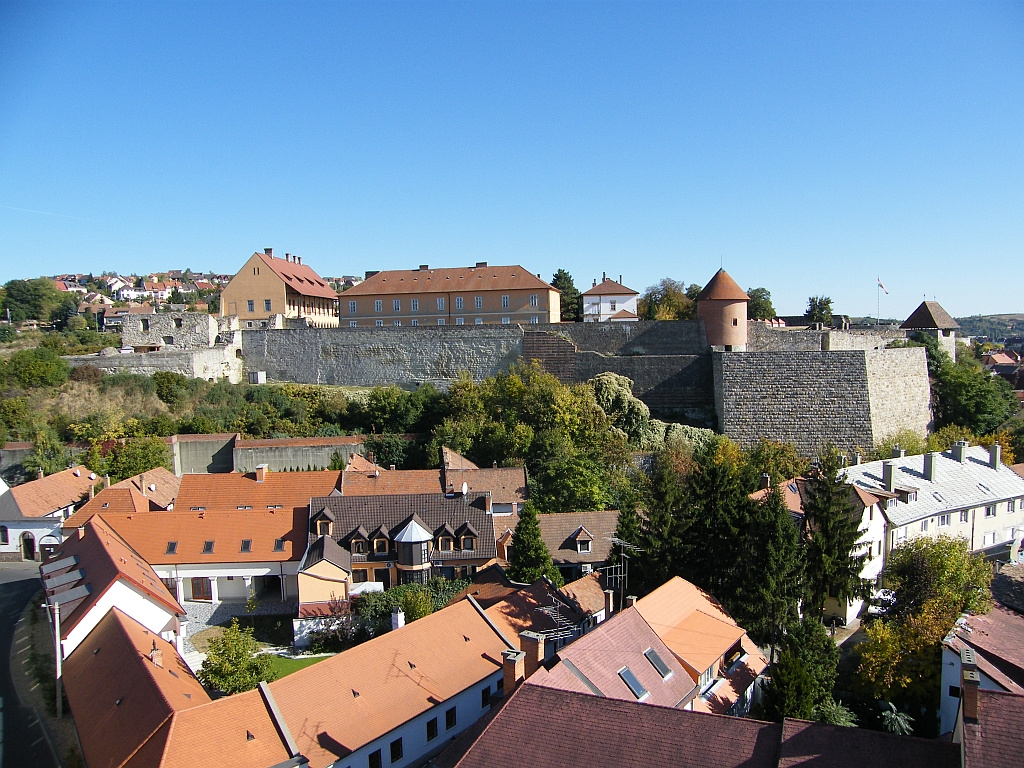
Eger Castle

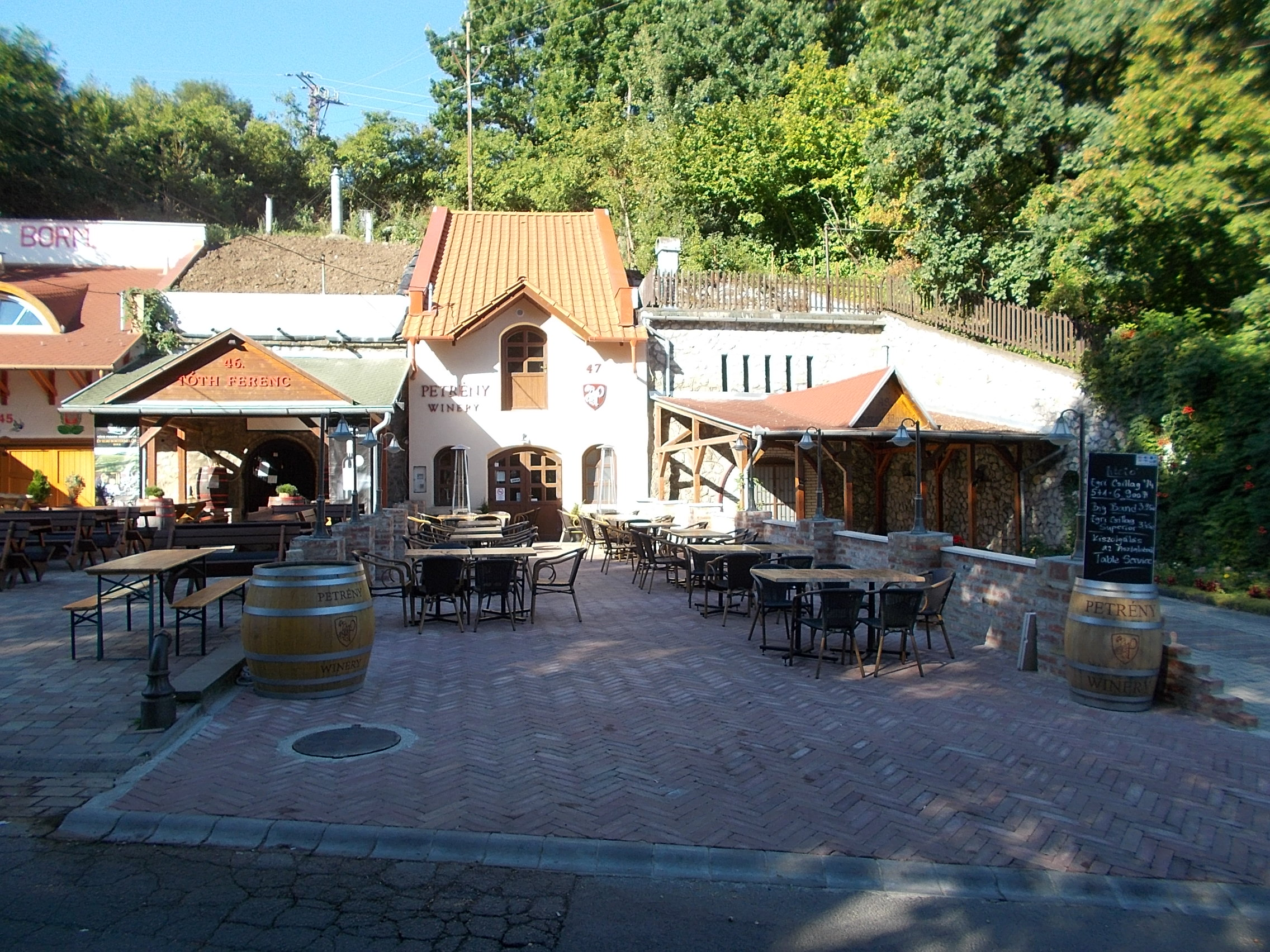
Szépasszony Valley in Eger

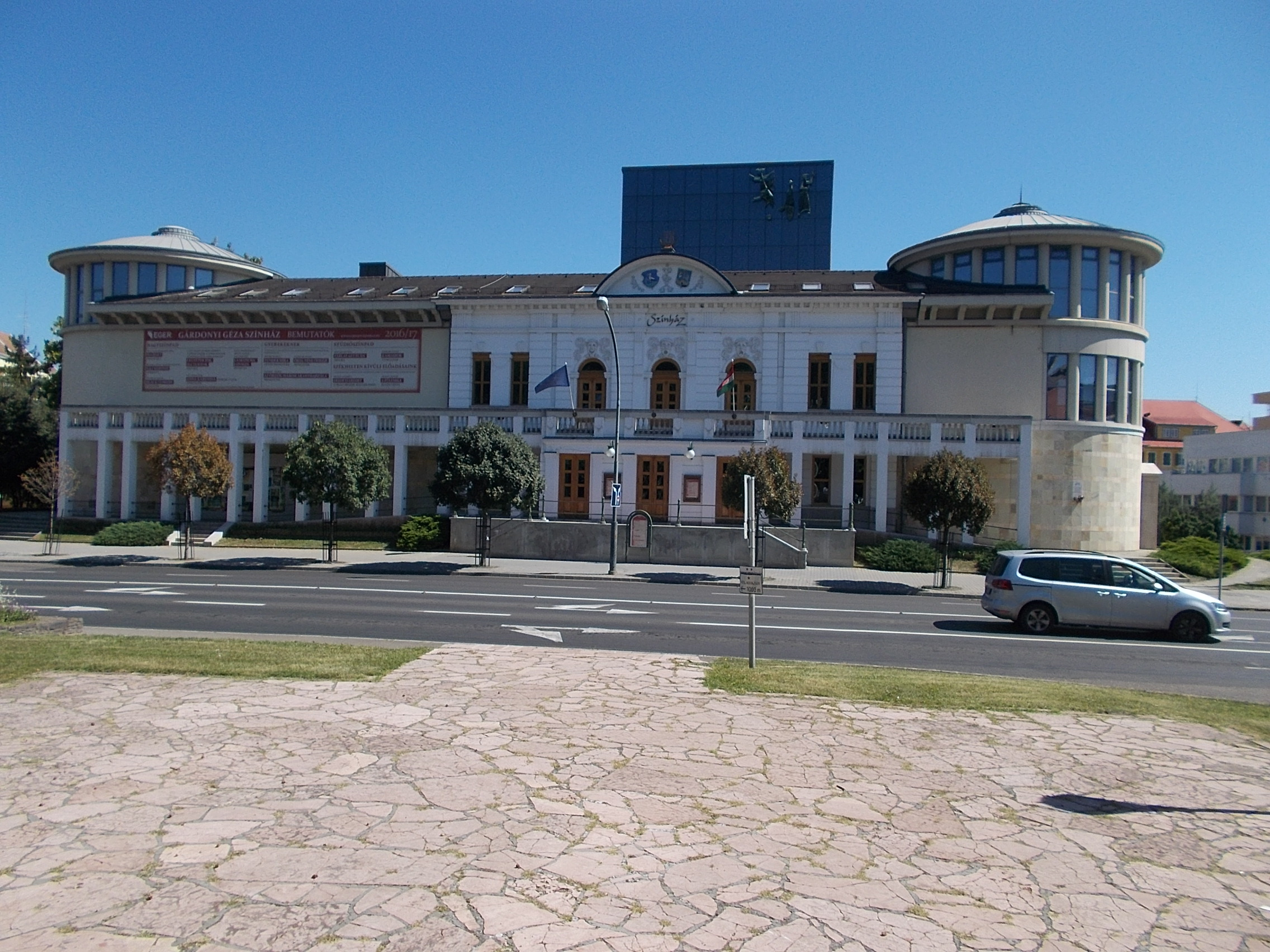
Géza Gárdonyi Theater (Eger)

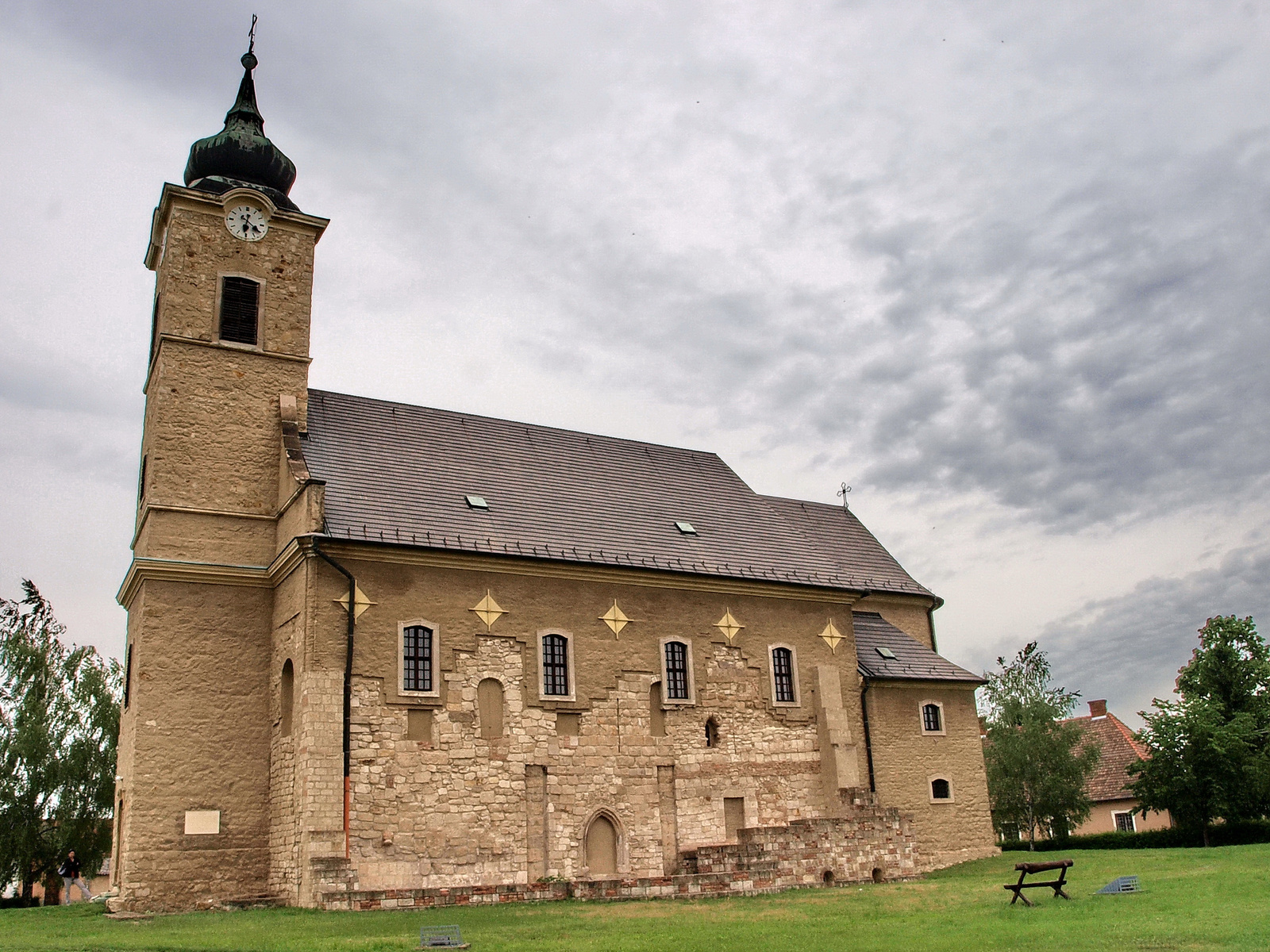
Roman Catholic Church in Feldebrő

== See also ==
- List of cities and towns of Hungary
