= Tarnaszentmária =

- Village
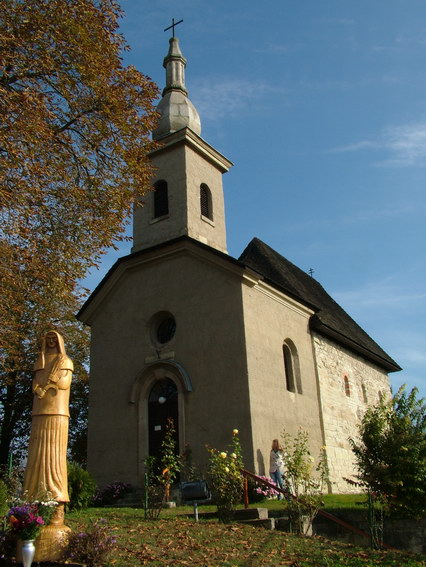
- Visitation of Our Lady church

- Coat of arms

- Location in Hungary
- Coordinates: 47°53′N 20°12′E
- Country: Hungary
- County: Heves
- District: Eger
- First mentioned: 1325

Government
  - Mayor: Gabriella Flesch (Ind.)

Area
  - Total: 11.00 km^{2} (4.25 sq mi)

Population (2022)
  - Total: 227
  - Density: 20.6/km^{2} (53.4/sq mi)
- Time zone: UTC+1 (CET)
  - Summer (DST): UTC+2 (CEST)
- Postal code: 3331
- Area code: 36
- Website: www.tarnaszentmaria.hu

Tarnaszentmária is a village in Heves County, Hungary, under the Mátra mountain range, beside of the Tarna River. As of 2022 census, it has a population of 227 (see Demographics). The village located 17.6 km from Eger, the capital of the county and beside of the (Nr. 84) Kisterenye–Kál-Kápolna railway line, 15.5 km from the main road 3 and 21.2 km from the M3 motorway. Although the settlement has its own railway stop, public transport on the railway line ceased on 3 March 2007. The closest train station with public transport is in Eger 17.9 km away.

== History ==
The village is first mentioned as Torna in 1325 and then as Szentmária in 1339, in the certificates. The owner of the village is the 16-17th century, the Szentmáriay family owned the village. It was destroyed during the Siege of Eger castle in 1552. The village was presumably inhabited again around 1590, but was depopulated again during the Long Turkish War. István Szentmáriay sold the wasteland in 1656 to Menyhért Ragályi. After Great Turkish War the wasteland was confiscated by the treasury as acquired by arms and sold to János Enczinger in 1696. It was used by István Orczy for a while during the Rákóczi's War of Independence, and from 1711 Eiczinger was the landlord again. Between 1717 and 1719, the settlement was repopulated. In 1721, it was owned by the city of Eger, from 1722 by Tarródy, then by the Gellén and Csuma families. The population of the village was 192 people in 1746, most of whom spoke Slovak. In the 18th century, the inhabitants lived by burning charcoal, and the arable land was expanded by deforestation. 509 people were registered in the village in 1859, which was owned by the Dózlern, Fáy, and Bárczay families from the beginning of the 19th century. In the 1930s, the majority of the village made a living from farming. Their main crops were wheat, barley, oats, green fodder and potatoes. There were several quarries in operation within the boundaries of the village. The village was one of the stone carving centers of the region. In the 20th century, stone was quarried for the construction of large roads and residential buildings, the remains of which can still be seen in the former quarry. Between 1960 and 1966, the settlement had its own agricultural cooperative. Since 1955, it has been a village with an independent council, belonging to the Verpelét District Registry Office.

== The oldest church in Hungary ==
In the center of the village stands the Roman Catholic church, probably the oldest built in today's Hungary and almost completely preserving its original form. The opinions of researchers dealing with the history of medieval architecture are divided about the time of the church's construction, its specific spatial design and the prototypes of its stone carvings. However, they agree that it was built in the 10-11th century. It can be dated to the turn of the 19th century, and its architectural features reflect a Byzantine influence, and its decorations also reflect an oriental treasure. The possible founder is Samuel Aba, who was the son-in-law of Grand Prince Géza.
In the middle of the nave of the church, a family tomb was discovered, whose age can be dated to the 15th-16th century based on the prehistoric and medieval pottery fragments found there. The tomb of the crypt was disturbed several times, and was already found empty when it was excavated. The nave of the one-nave church is closed on the east side by a horseshoe-shaped, three-lobed, vaulted sanctuary on the inside. A staircase leads up from the nave to the sanctuary, under which there is a small crypt. During the excavation, a mine grave was found in its central section. The inner wall surface of the church is decorated with pilasters, and they stand on stone benches decorated with carvings created next to the walls. The upward, spiral-shaped bands and staircase-like decorations of the column trunks give the columns a woodcarving character.
The church was badly damaged during the Turkish occupation, it is not even mentioned in the parish census of 1696, and in 1723 it was still in a bad condition. It was restored and consecrated in honor of the Visitation of Our Lady in 1734. There was already a small wooden tower on top in 1767. The church was renovated in 1849-51, but even then it turned out to be small. Parish priest Mihály Dankó extended the nave in 1872-73 by a third by removing the western pediment wall. At the suggestion of the National Committee of Monuments (national organization of the ICOMOS), he rebuilt the two stone columns removed from the old wall on the inner side of the new gable wall and also completed the wooden porch. He had a stone bell tower built for the new walls, the most striking feature of which is its eight-sided helmet made of carved stones. It gained its present form during the 1977-86 monument excavation and renovation. There is an active religious life in the church. The feast of the patron saint of the village is on the closest Sunday to 2 July.

== Demographics ==
According the 2022 census, 89.1% of the population were of Hungarian ethnicity, 1.4% were Greek, 0.9% were Slovak, 0.5% were German and 10.9% were did not wish to answer. The religious distribution was as follows: 42.7% Roman Catholic, 4.1% Calvinist, 0.9% Lutheran, 0.5% Greek Catholic, 10.0% non-denominational, and 38.6% did not wish to answer.

Population by years:

Year	1870	1880	1890	1900	1910	1920	1930	1941
Population	509	437	447	492	471	564	547	597
Year	1949	1960	1970	1980	1990	2001	2011	2022
Population	621	655	603	472	414	294	229	227

== Politics ==
Mayors since 1990:

- 1990–1994: Pál Hídvégi (independent)
- 1994–2006: Gyula Majoros (independent)
- 2006–2019: István László Czipó (independent)
- 2019–: Gabriella Flesch (independent)

== Bibliography ==
- Csemegi J.: A tarnaszentmáriai templom hajójának stíluskritikai vizsgálata (The stylecritical study of the Tarnaszentmária Church), Antiquitas Hungarica III, 1949, p. 92-107.
- Kozák K. - M. Anda J.: Tarnaszentmária. Római katolikus templom (Tájak-Korok-Múzeumok Kiskönyvtára 321), Budapest, 1988, TKM Egyesület
- Mencl, Václav: Két ősi építészeti emlék Magyarországon. (Two old archaeo architectural heritage in Hungary), Művészettörténeti Értesítő VIII, 1959, page 217-220.
- Sápi, Lajos: A tarnaszentmáriai templom. (The Tarnaszentmária Church), Műemlékvédelem, XXIV, 1980, page 107-117.
- Gerevich T.: Magyarország románkori emlékei (Die romanischen Denkmäler Ungarns), Egyetemi nyomda, Budapest, 1939
- Szőnyi O. (É.n.): Régi magyar templomok. Alte Ungarische Kirchen. Anciennes églises Hongroises. Hungarian Churches of Yore. A Műemlékek Országos Bizottsága. Mirályi Magyar Egyetemi Nyomda, Budapest
- Henszlmann, I.: Magyarország ó-keresztyén, román és átmeneti stylü mű-emlékeinek rövid ismertetése, (Old-Christian, Romanesque and Transitional Style Architecture in Hungary). Királyi Magyar Egyetemi Nyomda, Budapest, 1876
- Genthon I.: Magyarország műemlékei. (Architectural Heritage of Hungary). Budapest, 1959
