= Hevesaranyos =

- Village (község)
- Coat of arms

- Location of Heves County in Hungary

- Location in Hungary
- Coordinates: 48°00′43″N 20°14′06″E
- Country: Hungary
- Region: Northern Hungary
- County: Heves County
- District: Eger

Government
  - Mayor: Sándor Hossó (Ind.)

Area
  - Total: 17.02 km^{2} (6.57 sq mi)

Population (2015)
  - Total: 600
  - Density: 35/km^{2} (91/sq mi)
- Time zone: UTC+1 (CET)
  - Summer (DST): UTC+2 (CEST)
- Postal code: 3322
- Area code: 36
- Website: www.hevesaranyos.hu

Hevesaranyos is a village in Heves County, Hungary.
