= Pál Medgyessy =

Pál Medgyessy (October 19, 1919, in Egercsehi – October 8, 1977, in Budapest) was a mathematician, Doctor of Mathematical Sciences (1973).

== Biography ==
He graduated at the University of Budapest as a student of Eötvös József Collegium. He started his career as a trainee at the Institute of Medical Physics at the University of Debrecen. Due to his illness, his scientific work was slow to develop.

He read the Latin-language classics in the original, spoke German, French, and Italian well, and during his captivity he also mastered Russian, so his skills were utilised as an interpreter during the war. He published some of his books in English.

He was an aspirant to the candidate's degree at the Mathematical Research Institute of the Hungarian Academy of Sciences, a student of Alfréd Rényi’s. From 1955 on he was a research associate and scientific advisor at the Institute. He received his doctorate in mathematics from the HAS in 1973.

== Research interests ==
His main research interests were probability, mathematical statistics, and their applications; his results on numerical methods are also remarkable. Many of his papers are in the fields of medicine, biology, chemistry, and spectroscopy. His results on various non-electronic calculators and equipment are noteworthy.

He was an outstanding expert in bibliography, credited with the modernization of the mathematics section of the decimal classification and the preparation of several bibliographies, including those of the works of Frigyes Riesz and Alfréd Rényi.

His works on the history of science deal with ancient Babylonian and Egyptian science and the history of Chinese mathematics and astrology.

== Major works ==
=== In English ===
- Decompositions of Superposition of Distribution Functions (Bp., 1961), its 1995 edition: ISBN 978-1-4899-5624-8
- Decomposition of Superpositions of Density Functions and Discrete Distributions (New York, 1977). ISBN 978-0852742945.

=== In Hungarian ===
- Valószínűségeloszlás-függvények keverékének felbontása összetevőire ("Decomposition of mixtures of probability distribution functions into its components", Budapest, 1954)
- Valószínűségszámítás ("Probability theory", textbook, authored with Lajos Takács, Budapest, 1957, 1966)
- Sűrűségfüggvények és diszkrét eloszlások szuperpozíciójának felbontása ("Decomposition of density functions and superposition of discrete distributions", Budapest, 1971)
- Rényi Alfréd munkássága ("The Works of Alfréd Rényi", compiled, Budapest, 1971)
