= Egerbakta =

- Village (község)
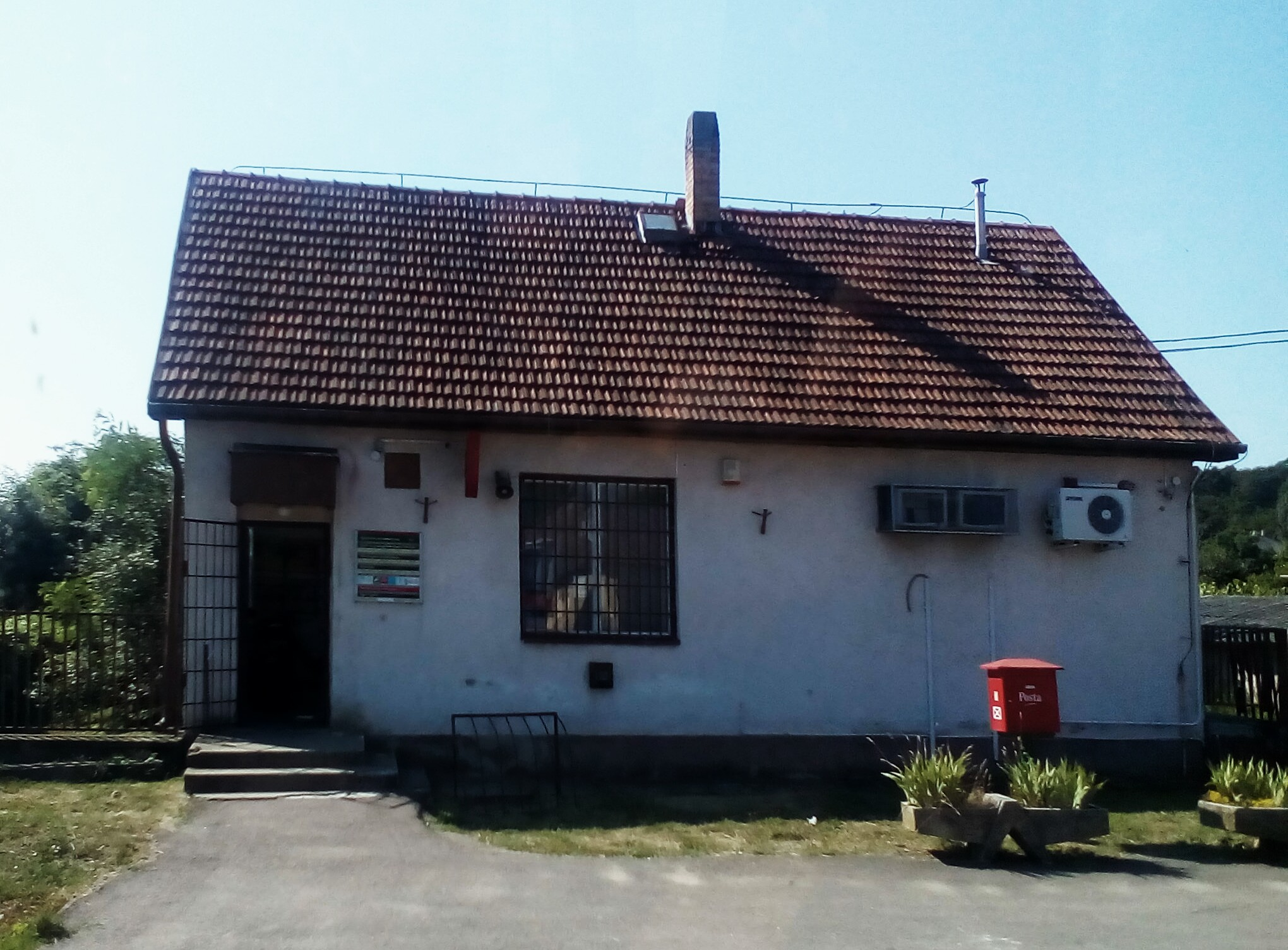
- Post office

- Coat of arms

- Location of Heves County in Hungary

- Location in Hungary
- Coordinates: 47°56′06″N 20°17′28″E
- Country: Hungary
- Region: Northern Hungary
- County: Heves County
- District: Eger

Government
  - Mayor: Tibor Varga (Ind.)

Area
  - Total: 32.37 km^{2} (12.50 sq mi)

Population (2021)
  - Total: 1,388
  - Density: 42.88/km^{2} (111.1/sq mi)
- Time zone: UTC+1 (CET)
  - Summer (DST): UTC+2 (CEST)
- Postal code: 3321
- Area code: 36
- Website: egerbakta.hu/

Egerbakta is a village in Heves County, Hungary. As of 2015, it has a population of 1,420, and 1,388 as of the 2021 estimate.

== History ==
The earliest written record of the village dates back to 1261.

== Demographics ==
According the 2011 census, 94.5% of the population were of Hungarian ethnicity and 21.4% were Gypsies (5.5% did not declare; due to dual identities, the total may be higher than 100%). The religious distribution was as follows: Roman Catholic 85%, Reformed 2%, Lutheran 0.2%, non-denominational 3.4%, and 8.8% unknown.
