= Egercsehi =

- Village (község)
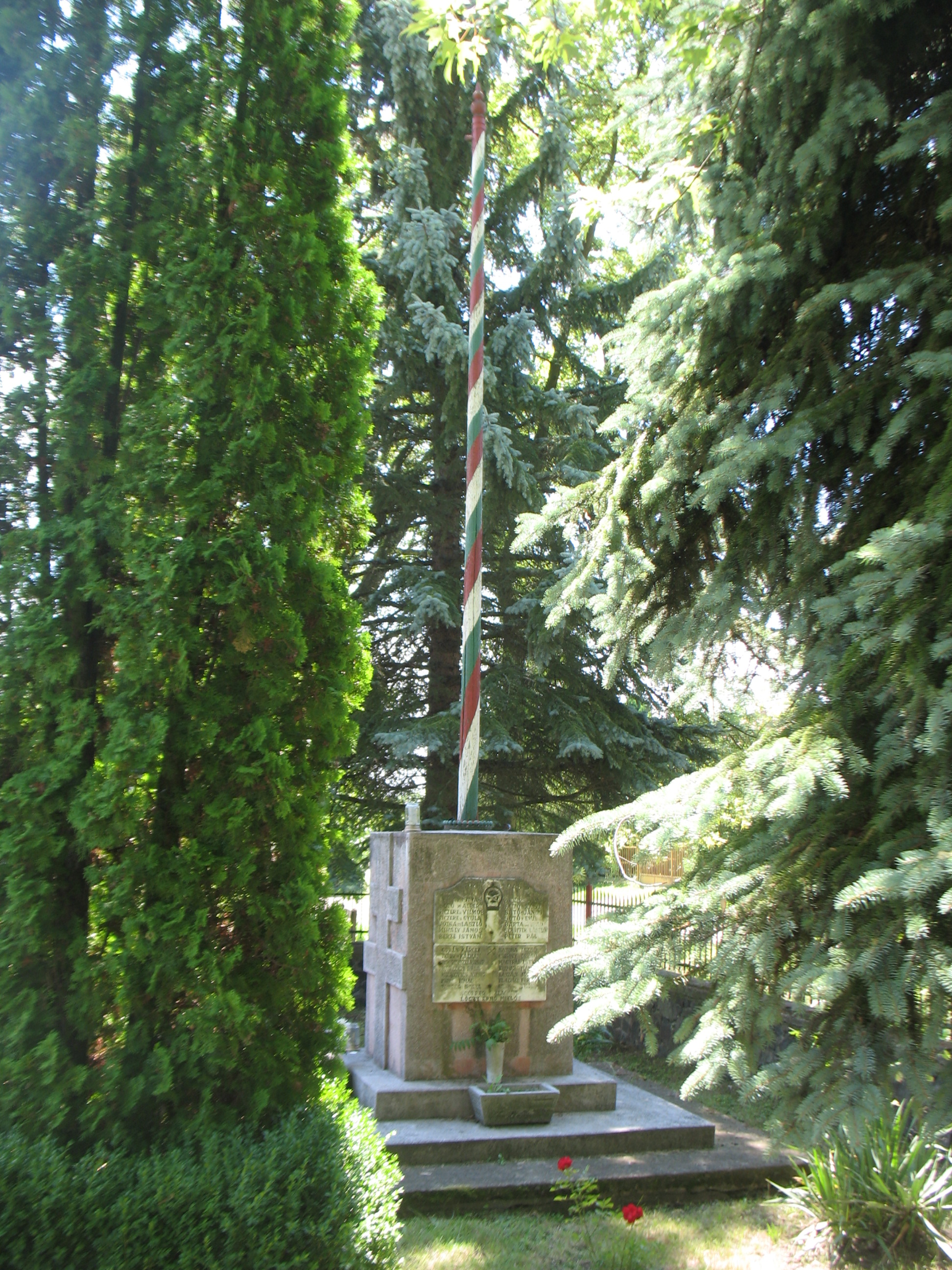
- A monument in Egercsehi

- Flag Coat of arms

- Location of Heves County in Hungary

- Location in Hungary
- Coordinates: 48°03′11″N 20°15′40″E
- Country: Hungary
- Region: Northern Hungary
- County: Heves County
- District: Eger

Government
  - Mayor: András Kovács (Ind.)

Area
  - Total: 10.39 km^{2} (4.01 sq mi)

Population (2021)
  - Total: 1,281
  - Density: 123.3/km^{2} (319.3/sq mi)
- Time zone: UTC+1 (CET)
  - Summer (DST): UTC+2 (CEST)
- Postal code: 3321
- Area code: 36
- Website: egerbakta.hu

Egercsehi is a village in Heves County, Hungary. As of 2015, it has a population of 1,320, and 1,281 as of the 2021 estimate.

== History ==
The earliest written record of the village dates back to 1285.

=== The jewish community ===
Jews lived in the village in the 18th and 19th centuries until 1944, when most of the Jews from the village were murdered in the Holocaust. In the area of the village, the Nazis concentrated many Jews from the area, including the Jews of the village of Kál and Pétervására.

== Demographics ==
According the 2011 census, 82.3% of the population were of Hungarian ethnicity and 8.4% were Gypsies, 17.6% were undeclared, and 0.5% were German (due to dual identities, the total may be higher than 100%). The religious distribution was as follows: Roman Catholic 33%, Reformed 3.6%, Lutheran 0.4%, Greek Catholic 0.4%, non-denominational 26.8%, and 34.4% unknown.

== Sights ==
- Beniczky Mansion: This is the best-known building associated with the Beniczky Family. It came into their possession in the early 19th century. The mansion was built in the Neoclassical style by Zsigmond Beniczky.

== Notable people ==
- Pál Medgyessy (1919–1977) mathematician
