= Feldebrő =

- Village
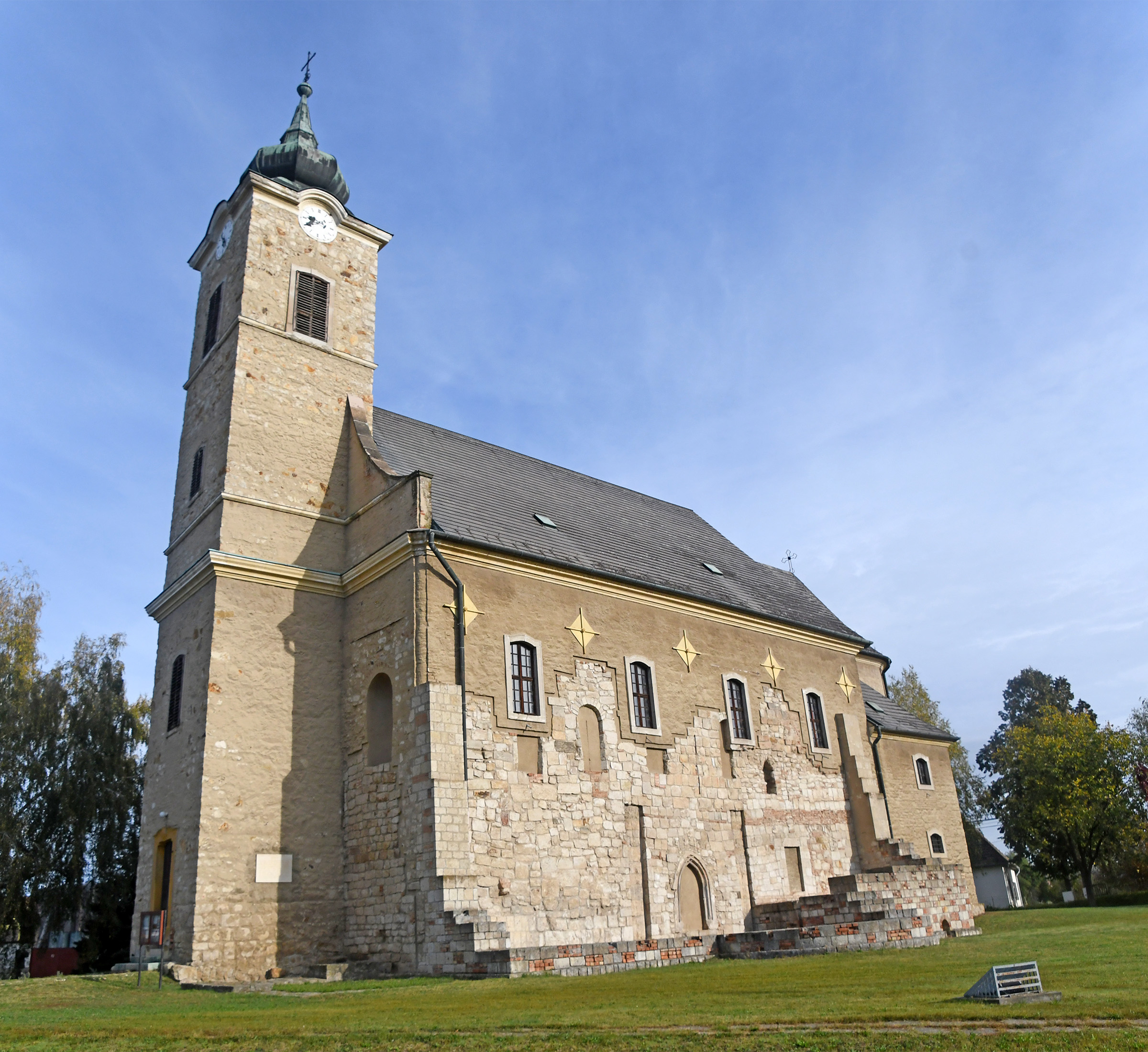
- Saint Martin church

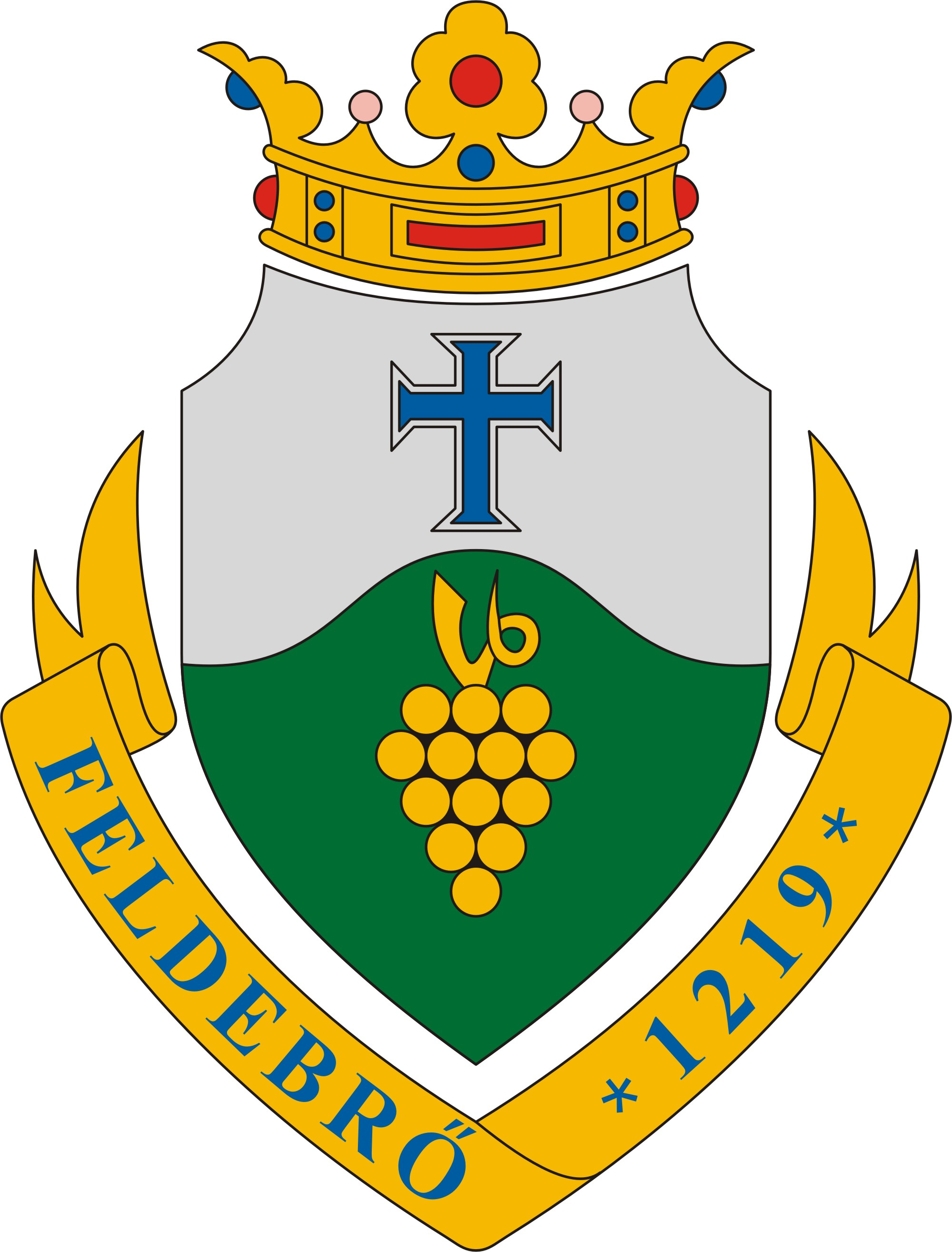
- Coat of arms

- Location in Hungary
- Coordinates: 47°48′50″N 20°14′10″E
- Country: Hungary
- County: Heves
- District: Eger
- First mentioned: 1219

Government
  - Mayor: Ernő János Jakab (Ind.)

Area
  - Total: 26.52 km^{2} (10.24 sq mi)

Population (2022)
  - Total: 1,000
  - Density: 38/km^{2} (98/sq mi)
- Time zone: UTC+1 (CET)
  - Summer (DST): UTC+2 (CEST)
- Postal code: 3352
- Area code: 36
- Website: www.feldebro.hu

Feldebrő is a village in Heves County, Hungary, beside of the Tarna River. As of 2022 census, it has a population of 1000 (see Demographics). The village located beside of the (Nr. 84) Kisterenye–Kál-Kápolna railway line and 6,8 km far from the main road 3 and 12,5 km far from the M3 motorway. Although the settlement has its own railway stop, public transport on the railway line ceased on March 3, 2007. The closest train station with public transport in Kál 10,1 km far.

== History ==
The name of the village comes from the Hungarian word debrő (broad valley). It may be related to the Slavic dialect term debra (floodplain). The builder of the Romanesque-style church and sub-church built in the 11th century may have been a royal figure, perhaps King Samuel himself, who built the church before his reign and was buried here after his death. The Saint Martin church combines features of Eastern and Western Christianity. The original church in the form of a Greek cross and later transformed into a three-nave church, but the original crypt was preserved. The name of the settlement was mentioned for the first time in 1219 as monastery Debrev, but it could have existed much earlier. The church was presumably built by the owner as a family monastery church. The village is also famous for its winemaking, it's located in the Eger wine region, and its wine, Debrői Hárslevelű, smells and tastes characteristically reminiscent of linden flowers.

== Demographics ==
According to the 2022 census, 90.3% of the population were of Hungarian ethnicity, 3.6% were Gypsies, 0,7% were Germans and 9.1% were did not wish to answer. The religious distribution was as follows: 36.3% Roman Catholic, 5.8% Calvinist, 16.1% non-denominational, and 40.5% did not wish to answer. 981 inhabitants live in the village and 10 in farms.

Population by years:

Year	1870	1880	1890	1900	1910	1920	1930	1941
Population	2293	2182	2063	1992	1844	2300	2086	1963
Year	1949	1960	1970	1980	1990	2001	2011	2022
Population	1920	2013	1745	1505	1304	1157	1041	1000

== Politics ==
Mayors since 1990:

- 1990–2000: József László Kelemen (independent)
- 2001–2002: Ferenc Doktor (FKgP-Fidesz-MKDSZ)
- 2002–2003: László Csepella † (independent)
- 2004–2010: Mihály Gábor Gecse (independent)
- 2010–2014: József László Kelemen (independent)
- 2014–2019: Mihály Gábor Gecse (independent)
- 2019–: Ernő János Jakab (independent)
