= Egerbocs =

- Village
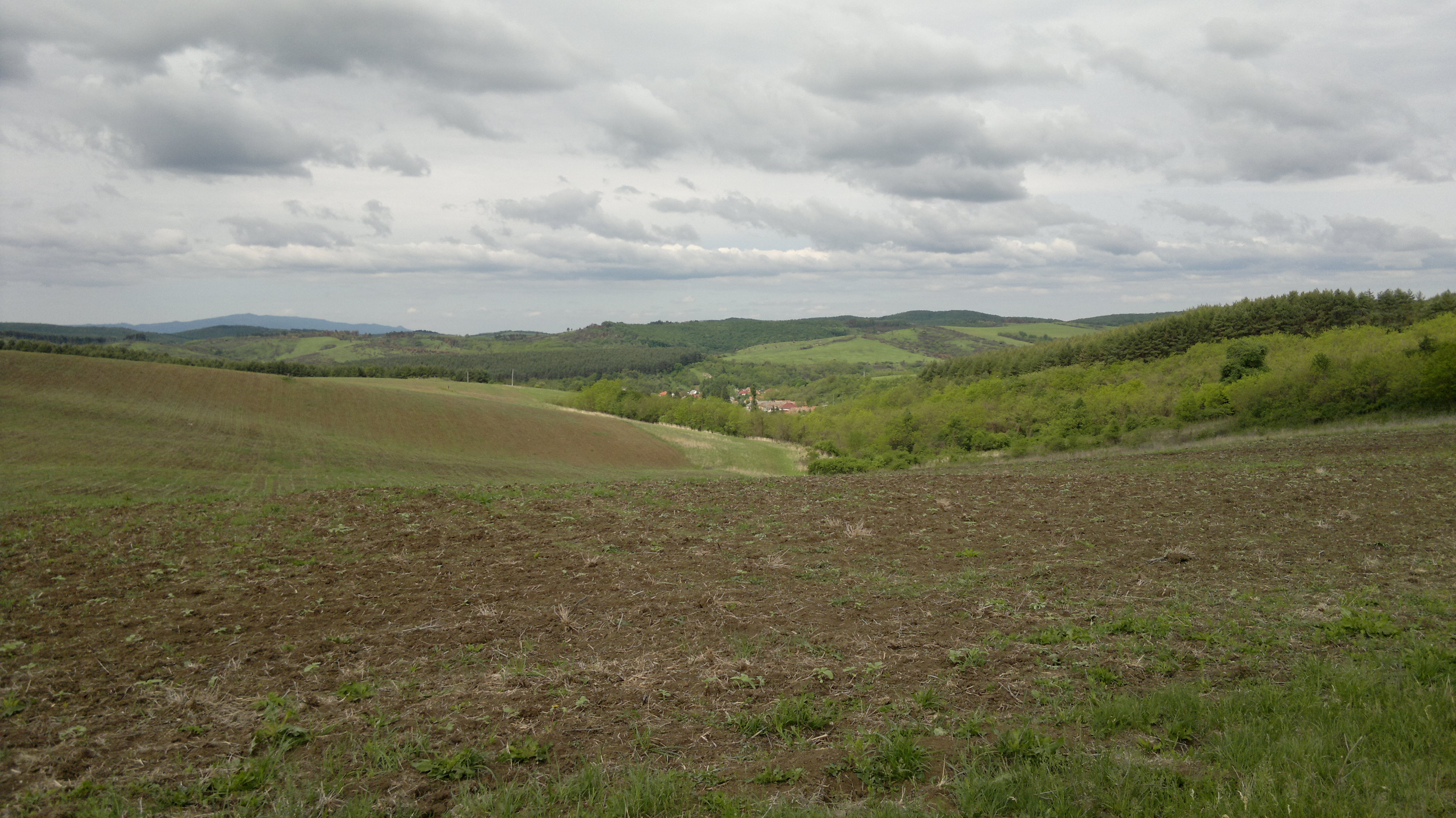

- Location of Egerbocs
- Coordinates: 48°01′41″N 20°15′40″E
- Country: Hungary
- Region: Northern Hungary
- County: Heves
- District: Eger

Area
  - Total: 34.42 km^{2} (13.29 sq mi)

Population (1 January 2025)
  - Total: 479
  - Density: 13.9/km^{2} (36.0/sq mi)
- Time zone: UTC+1 (CET)
  - Summer (DST): UTC+2 (CEST)
- Postal code: 3337
- Area code: (+36) 36
- Website: www.egorbocs.hu

Egerbocs is a village in Heves County, Hungary.
