= Demjén =

- Village
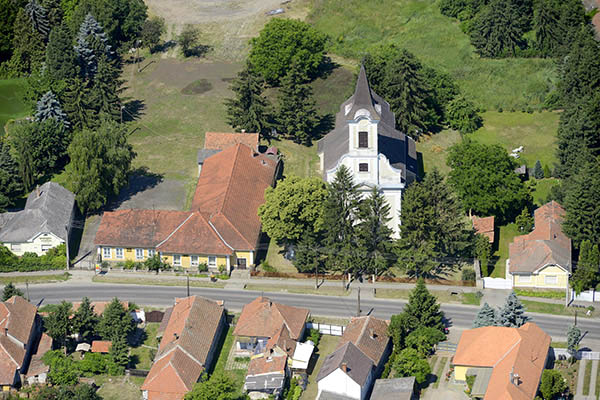

- Flag Coat of arms

- Location of Demjén
- Coordinates: 47.829°N 20.332°E
- Country: Hungary
- Region: Northern Hungary
- County: Heves
- District: Eger

Area
  - Total: 25.08 km^{2} (9.68 sq mi)

Population (1 January 2025)
  - Total: 997
  - Density: 39.8/km^{2} (103/sq mi)
- Time zone: UTC+1 (CET)
  - Summer (DST): UTC+2 (CEST)
- Postal code: 3395
- Area code: (+36) 36
- Website: www.demjen.hu

Demjén is a village in Heves County, Hungary.
