= Maklár =

- Municipality
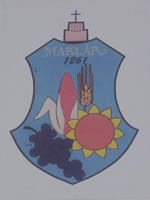
- Coat of arms

- Location in Hungary
- Coordinates: 47.81°N 20.41°E
- Country: Hungary
- Region: Northern Hungary
- County: Heves
- Subregion: Egri

Area
  - Total: 28.01 km^{2} (10.81 sq mi)

Population (2001)
  - Total: 2,337
  - Density: 83.43/km^{2} (216.1/sq mi)
- Time zone: UTC+1 (CET)
  - Summer (DST): UTC+2 (CEST)
- Postal code: 3397
- Area code: 36

Maklár is a municipality (Hungarian: község) in Heves county, in the Egri Subregion in Hungary. It lies between the villages of Kerecsend, Nagytálya, Novaj (Hungary), Szihalom and the town of Füzesabony. The village is located on the west banks of the Eger Creek, which name changes from here to Rima Creek. Maklár is located 11 kilometers south from Eger and 6 kilometers north from Füzesabony. The village has a railway station on the Eger-Füzesabony railway line.

An aerodrome is located in the northeast border of the village. The aerodrome has grass runway.

Maklár has one local primary school: I. István Általános Iskola.

== Geography ==
The village is located on the northern border of the Great Hungarian Plain and the southern border of Bükk Mountains. The southern part of its area is plain. The eastern and western parts of its area are hillside. The highest point on this area has not reach 130 meters over the sea level. The village covered from east by the Öreghegy (Old Hill) and from the west by the Nagy-Aszó hills.
