= Bátor =

- Village
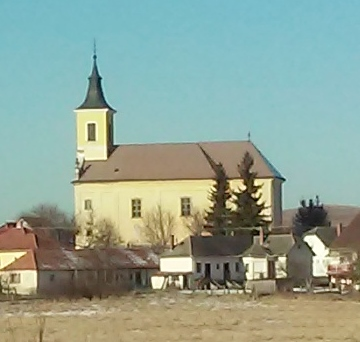

- Location of Bátor
- Coordinates: 47°59′27″N 20°15′57″E
- Country: Hungary
- Region: Northern Hungary
- County: Heves
- District: Eger

Area
  - Total: 12.66 km^{2} (4.89 sq mi)

Population (1 January 2025)
  - Total: 369
  - Density: 29.1/km^{2} (75.5/sq mi)
- Time zone: UTC+1 (CET)
  - Summer (DST): UTC+2 (CEST)
- Postal code: 3336
- Area code: (+36) 36
- Website: www.bator.hu

Bátor is a village in Heves County, Hungary.
