= Verpelét =

- Town
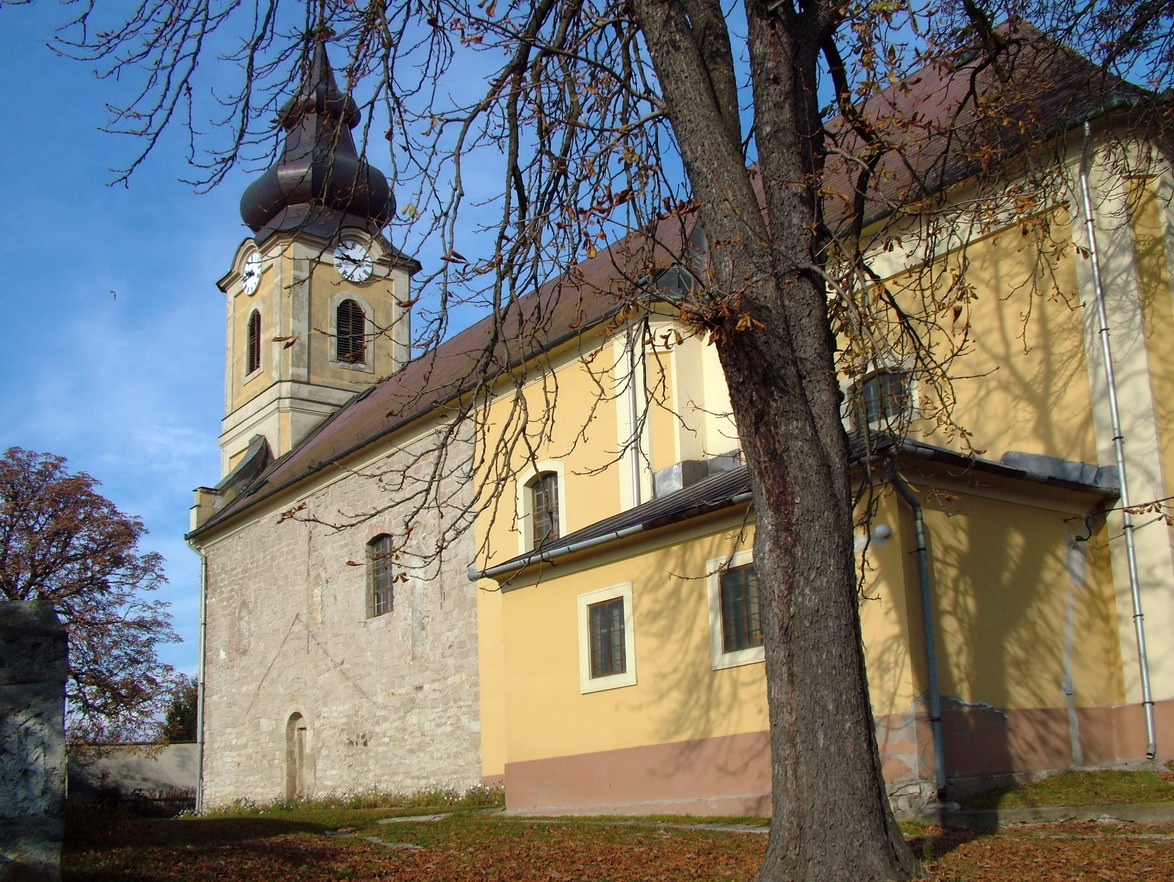
- Christ the King church

- Flag Coat of arms

- Location in Hungary
- Coordinates: 47°50′53″N 20°13′34″E
- Country: Hungary
- County: Heves
- District: Eger
- First mentioned: 1252

Government
  - Mayor: Sándor Farkas (Fidesz–KDNP)

Area
  - Total: 53.18 km^{2} (20.53 sq mi)

Population (2022)
  - Total: 3,738
  - Density: 70.29/km^{2} (182.0/sq mi)
- Time zone: UTC+1 (CET)
  - Summer (DST): UTC+2 (CEST)
- Postal code: 3264, 3331, 3351
- Area code: 36
- Website: www.verpelet.hu

Verpelét is a town in Heves County, Hungary, under the Mátra mountain range, beside of the Tarna River. As of 2022 census, it has a population of 3738 (see Demographics). The town located 17.3 km from Eger, the capital of the county and beside of the (Nr. 84) Kisterenye–Kál-Kápolna railway line, 10.7 km from the main road 3 and 16.4 km from the M3 motorway. Although the settlement has its own railway station, public transport on the railway line ceased on 3 March 2007. The closest train station with public transport is in Kál 14.0 km away.

== History ==
In addition to Bronze Age and Celtic finds, Scythian relics were also found in the border of Verpelét, the settlement was already an inhabited area for thousands of years before the Hungarian conquest. Despite the fact that the personal name Welprit can already be read in a certificate from 1211, its first mention in a certificate survives from 1252, and then in 1331 it is mentioned again in the form of Welpreth. The names Vahret, Welp(e)rech, Wepret, Welpud, Welperek are found in the certificates dated 1332. In the second half of the 13th century, the village was owned by the Verpeléti branch from the Aba family. The settlement's first church was built in the 13th century and named after Christ the King. From the middle of the 14th century the county assemblies and court sessions were held here on several occasions, in the presence of the Palatine. The settlement came into the possession of the Tari family in 1389 and became part of the Sirok castle. The ownership of the village became the property of the Országh and Kompolti families, and after 1552 it passed to the Országh family. The guard men of Ippolito d'Este, Bishop of Eger, defeated an army of rebellious peasants near Verpelét in 1514. The local population already paid taxes to the Ottomans in 1555 after 16 houses. The settlement was listed in the tax census with only one and a half ports in 1686. It was recorded that the people of Verpelét left the old village site, because the settlement burned down earlier in 1695.
The 1701 census registered the settlement as a populous market town, at which time 69 adult male taxpayers and 65 female taxpayers were registered. The 18th century can also be attributed to the development of the landlords' management of majors. The first merchants of the settlement were the innkeepers. By the beginning of the 19th century, parallel to the growth of the population. Baron József Brudern, the owner of the settlement, received from the ruler the right to hold four national fairs a year from 1797. The Jews settled in the 17th century. The largest population of the Jewish community was registered in 1869 (324 people). The Jews were engaged in wine production and trade. The only wooden synagogue in the Carpathian Basin was built in Verepelét, which was demolished in 1961. The Jewish community was almost completely destroyed in the years of the Second World War, the former synagogue now houses the settlement's fire station.
The railway reached the settlement in 1886, when a local interest railway line from Kisterenye to Kisújszállás was built on the initiative of Count Gyula Károlyi. In the 20th century, new occupations appeared in the settlement: transporter, garbage collector, printer, hotelier, tire repairer, tailor, butcher and hairdresser. The number of small craftsmen increased to 81 people by 1983, who practiced a total of 84 professions. The settlement was a village from October 22, 1950, and was granted the status of a large village on May 1, 1973. With the land reform of 1945 237 new farms were established in Verpelét. They were primarily engaged in viticulture, inland farming, grain production and tobacco production. On September 4, 1948, the tenant cooperative was formed with 49 members. The establishment of the medium tank regiment in 1952 gave the settlement a new direction. Therefore, officers' quarters and service facilities. New apartments were built, some three-story block houses were completed, which gave Verpelét an urban appearance. The settlement is an economic center, an outstanding production and processing center of the western part of the Eger wine region. Thanks to wine tourism and living cultural traditions, it has significant tourism potential. Verpelét is a town since 2013. Nowadays two uninhabited outskirts: "Jakabdomb" and "Kistölgyes" – 2 and 6 km far from the town – have different postal codes (3331 and 3264).

== Demographics ==
According the 2022 census, 91.8% of the population were of Hungarian ethnicity, 8.9% were Gypsies and 8.0% were did not wish to answer. The religious distribution was as follows: 39.7% Roman Catholic, 2.7% Calvinist, 11.7% non-denominational, and 41.1% did not wish to answer. The Gypsies have a local nationality government. 3708 inhabitants live in the village and only 2 in farm.

Population by years:

Year	1870	1880	1890	1900	1910	1920	1930	1941
Population	3309	2872	3082	2860	3283	3930	4127	4193
Year	1949	1960	1970	1980	1990	2001	2011	2022
Population	4257	4563	4657	4388	4031	4034	3882	3738

== Politics ==
Mayors since 1990:

- 1990–1998: János Prokai (MSZP)
- 1998–2006: István Erdélyi (independent)
- 2006–: Sándor Farkas (independent until 2010, since then: Fidesz–KDNP)

== Notable people ==
- Katalin Kovács (1944–) singer and actress
- Tibor Czipó (1949–2019) bass guitarist
