= Nagytálya =

- Village (község)
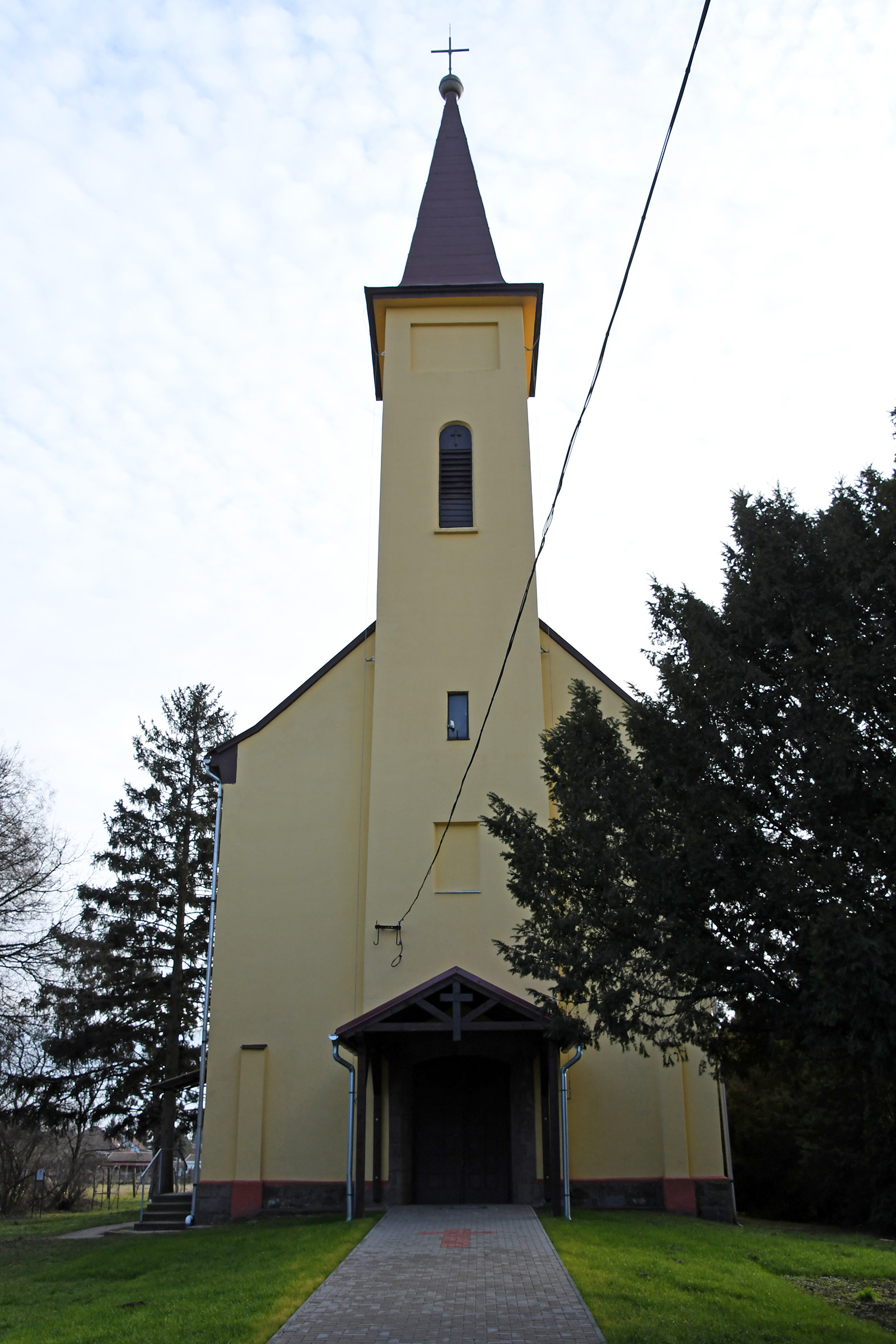
- Roman Catholic Church

- Location in Hungary
- Coordinates: 47°49′01″N 20°25′01″E
- Country: Hungary
- Region: Northern Hungary
- County: Heves County
- District: Eger

Government
  - Mayor: Orosz József (Ind.)

Area
  - Total: 13.19 km^{2} (5.09 sq mi)

Population (2021)
  - Total: 931
  - Density: 70.6/km^{2} (183/sq mi)
- Time zone: UTC+1 (CET)
  - Summer (DST): UTC+2 (CEST)
- Postal code: 3398
- Area code: 36

Nagytálya is a village in Heves County, Hungary. As of 2015, it has a population of 851, and 931 as of the 2021 estimate.

== History ==
The earliest written record of the village dates back to 1232.

== Demographics ==
According the 2011 census, 86.0% of the population were of Hungarian ethnicity, 0.3% were German, and 14.0% were undeclared (due to dual identities, the total may be higher than 100%). The religious distribution was as follows: 49.9% Roman Catholic, 6.2% Calvinist, 18.8% non-denominational, and 24.2% unknown.
