= Kerecsend =

- Village (község)
- Location of Heves County in Hungary

- Location of Kerecsend in Hungary
- Coordinates: 47°47′46″N 20°20′35″E
- Country: Hungary
- Region: Northern Hungary
- County: Heves County
- Subregion: Eger District

Government
  - Mayor: László Sári

Area
  - Total: 24.58 km^{2} (9.49 sq mi)

Population (1 Jan. 2015)
  - Total: 2,307
  - Density: 95.77/km^{2} (248.0/sq mi)
- Time zone: UTC+1 (CET)
  - Summer (DST): UTC+2 (CEST)
- Postal code: 3396
- Area code: 36
- Website: www.kerecsend.hu

Kerecsend is a village in Heves County, Northern Hungary Region, Hungary.

== Geography ==
The village is located on the northern part of the Great Hungarian Plain, 14 km south from Eger in Heves county.

== Communications ==
Kerecsend is on Road 3 and here starts the Road 25.

== Sights to visit ==
- Church
