= Petőfibánya =

- Village
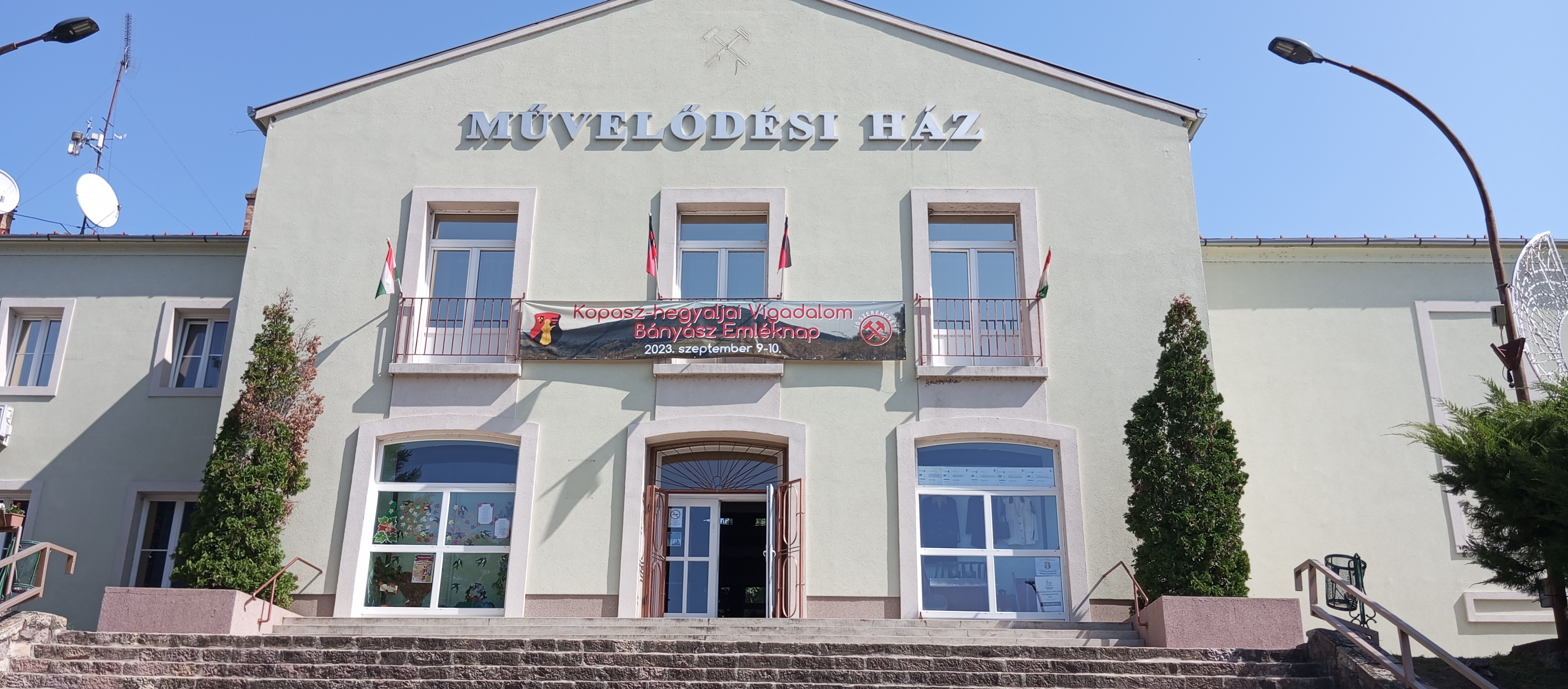
- Cultural Center

- Coat of arms

- Location in Hungary
- Coordinates: 47°45′57″N 19°42′07″E
- Country: Hungary
- County: Heves
- District: Hatvan
- First mentioned: 1942

Government
  - Mayor: Péter Juhász (Ind.)

Area
  - Total: 11.11 km^{2} (4.29 sq mi)

Population (2022)
  - Total: 2,457
  - Density: 221.2/km^{2} (572.8/sq mi)
- Time zone: UTC+1 (CET)
  - Summer (DST): UTC+2 (CEST)
- Postal code: 3023
- Area code: 37
- Website: www.petofibanya.hu

Petőfibánya is a village in Heves County, Hungary, beside the Zagyva river, under the Mátra mountain range. As of the 2022 census, it has a population of 2457 (see Demographics). The village is located 2.7 km from (Nr. 81) Hatvan–Fiľakovo railway line, 2.9 km from the main road 21, and 11.9 km from the M3 motorway. The closest train station with public transport is in Lőrinci.

== History ==
At the end of the 19th century, the owner of the area was the Schossberger family, who used the area for grape production. The center of the estate was a farm called Pernyepuszta. The extraction of the discovered lignite began in 1942 by the Mátravidék Coal Mines Company and an industrial railway was built from Lőrinci to the mine. The creation of miners' apartments began in 1943 around the mine. Mining was interrupted in the autumn of 1944, and the equipment was hidden in the mine, because of the war. At the beginning of 1945, the apartments were once again filled with miners, and the operation of the mine resumed in 1948. The settlement was named Petőfibánya (Petőfi mine) in 1949 after the Hungarian poet Sándor Petőfi. The mined coal was processed at the Mátravidék Power Plant. A doctor's office was built after 1950, together with a dentist's office, the cultural center, sports fields, the school and houses with gardens were built. The effective work of the miners was recognized with state awards in 1959. The appearance of open-pit mining marked the end of mining in the settlement. The mine was closed in 1967, as extraction became more economical in Ecséd and Visonta, but the lignite wealth remained. However, the population did not leave the mining settlement, but remained and started commuting to other places. The settlement was officially part of Lőrinci till 1989, then formed an independent village.

== Demographics ==
According the 2022 census, 89.3% of the population were of Hungarian ethnicity, 0.7% were Ukrainian and 10.5% were did not wish to answer. The religious distribution was as follows: 22.3% Roman Catholic, 2.0% Calvinist, 34.1% non-denominational, and 38.1% did not wish to answer. 2447 people live in the village and 10 in a farm.

Population by years:

Year	1890	1900	1910	1920	1930	1941	1949
Population	0	94	146	192	185	151	1080
Year	1960	1970	1980	1990	2001	2011	2022
Population	3981	3718	3614	3343	3152	2809	2457

== Politics ==
Mayors since 1990:

- 1990–1992: László Fekete (independent)
- 1992–1994: István Papp (independent)
- 1994–2010: László Fekete (independent)
- 2010–2019: Éva Barkóczy, Mrs. Juhász (independent)
- 2019–: Péter Juhász (independent)
