= Mátraverebély =

- Village
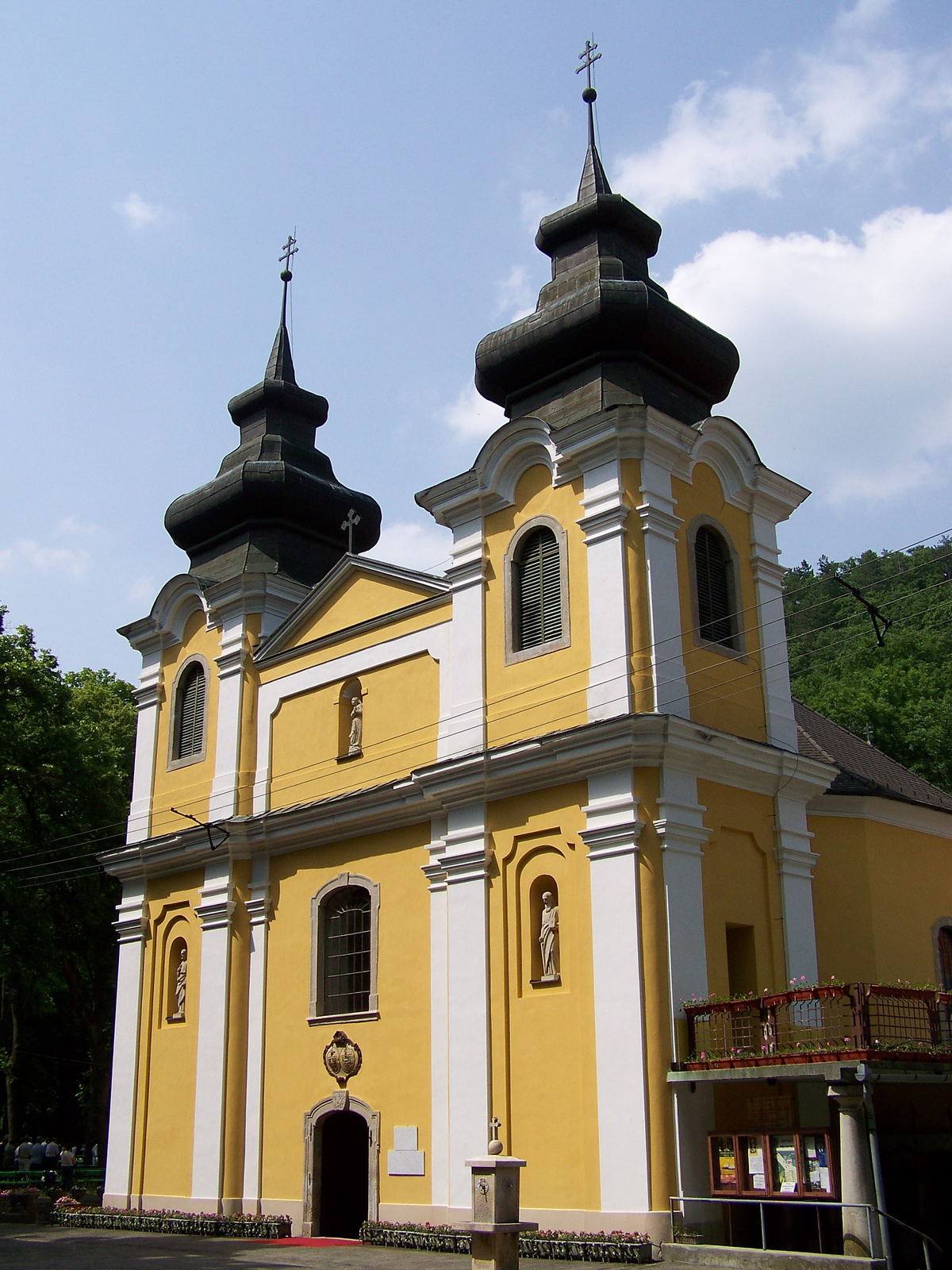
- Assumption of Mary Basilica in Szentkút

- Coat of arms

- Location in Hungary
- Coordinates: 47°58′46″N 19°46′31″E
- Country: Hungary
- County: Nógrád
- District: Bátonyterenye
- First mentioned: 1337

Government
  - Mayor: Attila Nagy (Ind.)

Area
  - Total: 18.40 km^{2} (7.10 sq mi)

Population (2022)
  - Total: 1,752
  - Density: 95.22/km^{2} (246.6/sq mi)
- Time zone: UTC+1 (CET)
  - Summer (DST): UTC+2 (CEST)
- Postal code: 3077, 3078
- Area code: 32
- Website: www.matraverebely.hu

Mátraverebély is a village in Nógrád County, Hungary, beside the Zagyva river, between the Cserhát and Mátra mountain ranges. As of 2022 census, it has a population of 1752 (see Demographics). The main road 21 goes across the village, which located beside of the (Nr. 81) Hatvan–Fiľakovo railway line and 38.4 km away from the M3 motorway. The village has its own railway stop with public transport.

== History ==
The name of the settlement come from the Slavic word vrábel (sparrow). The first documented mention of the village was in the papal tithe list of 1337 under the name Verebély, where the church, which was built in the 12th century in the Romanesque style, is already mentioned. The church was expanded to three naves in the Gothic style after 1380, when the settlement was given the status of a market town. Stories about the healing power of Szentkút (holy well) have been known since the 12th century. Szentkút is one of the oldest and most visited shrines of Mary in Hungary. Péter Verebi, the ruler of the settlement, managed to obtain the right to hold a national fair from King Sigismund in 1400, and an indulgence license from Pope Boniface IX. Péter Verebi was buried in the northern aisle of the church in 1403. Due to the Ottoman devastation, the village is depopulated and the church is damaged, which is restored in Baroque style after the resettlement. The pulpit was made in Renaissance style. The village was owned by the Cistercian Order between 1733 and 1756, and then bought by the Almásy family. A granary built in Baroque style by the new owner can still be seen today. The construction of the two-tower baroque basilica in Szentkút was completed in 1763, financed by the Verebélyi and Almásy families. The main altar, the pulpit and the statues are Rococo, the side altar is in the Copf style. The statue of Mary on the high altar, on the other hand, is in the Baroque style. Franciscan monks settled near the church in 1772, who built pilgrim accommodation, a calvary, and a chapel. In addition to the Franciscans, the hermits appeared who dug caves into the mountainside. Today's Calvary Chapel was built in 1933. Pope Paul VI raised the church to the rank of basilica minor and granted the privilege of full indulgence for every day of the year. The government classified it as a national place of worship, renovated it and in 2015 created an open-air mass place. Mátraverebély is a stamping place of the National Blue Trail.

== Demographics ==
According the 2022 census, 89.0% of the population were of Hungarian ethnicity, 12.3% were Gypsies and 11.0% were did not wish to answer. The religious distribution was as follows: 41.3% Roman Catholic, 1.7% Calvinist, 0.9% Lutheran, 16.1% non-denominational, and 39.0% did not wish to answer. 1503 people live in the central inner area and three other inner area exist: Kányástelep, Kányáspuszta and Szentkút with 210, 34 and 11 inhabitants and 2.6, 2.9 and 5.6 km away from the village. On the only farm also live 8 persons.

Population by years:

Year	1870	1880	1890	1900	1910	1920	1930	1941
Population	1100	965	1058	1163	1260	1348	1579	1700
Year	1949	1960	1970	1980	1990	2001	2011	2022
Population	1944	2541	3070	2927	2399	2229	1986	1752

== Politics ==
Mayors since 1990:

- 1990–1998: Sándor Oláh (independent)
- 1998–1999: Mrs. József Bakonyi (MP)
- 2000–2010: Attila Nagy (MSZP)
- 2010–2014: Mária Seres (CM)
- 2014–: Attila Nagy (independent)

== Gallery ==
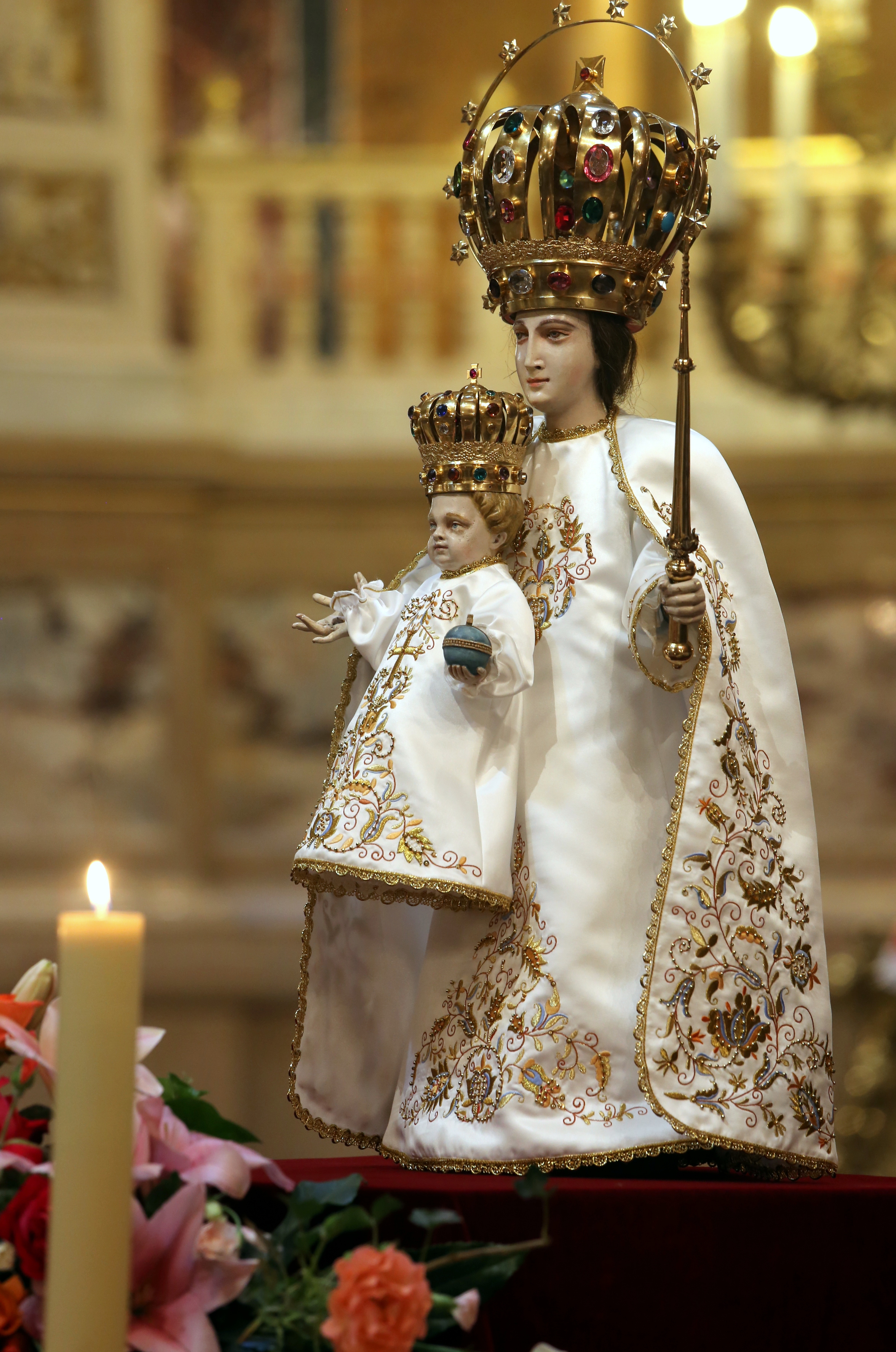
Virgin Mary statue of Grace

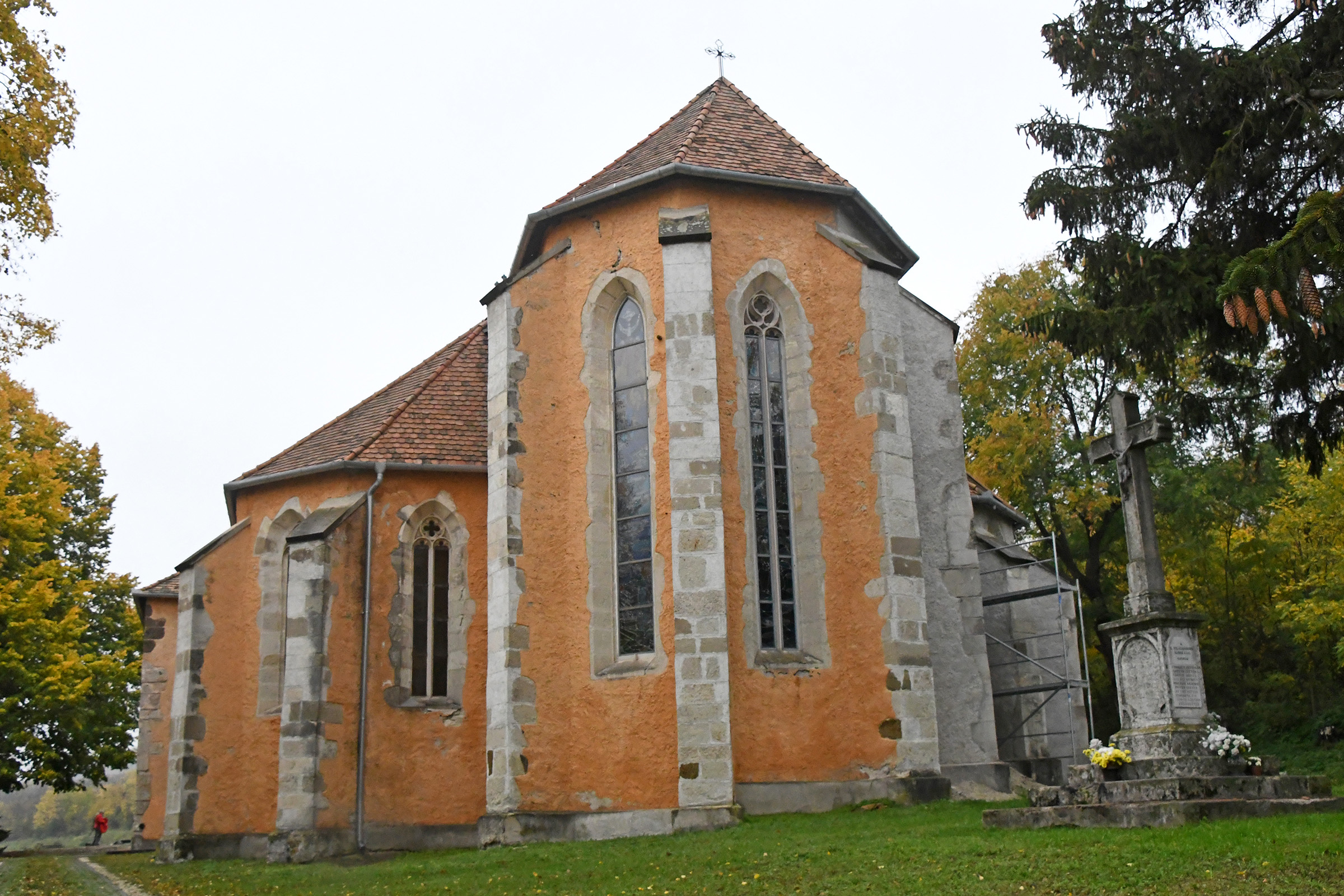
Assumption of Mary church in Mátraverebély

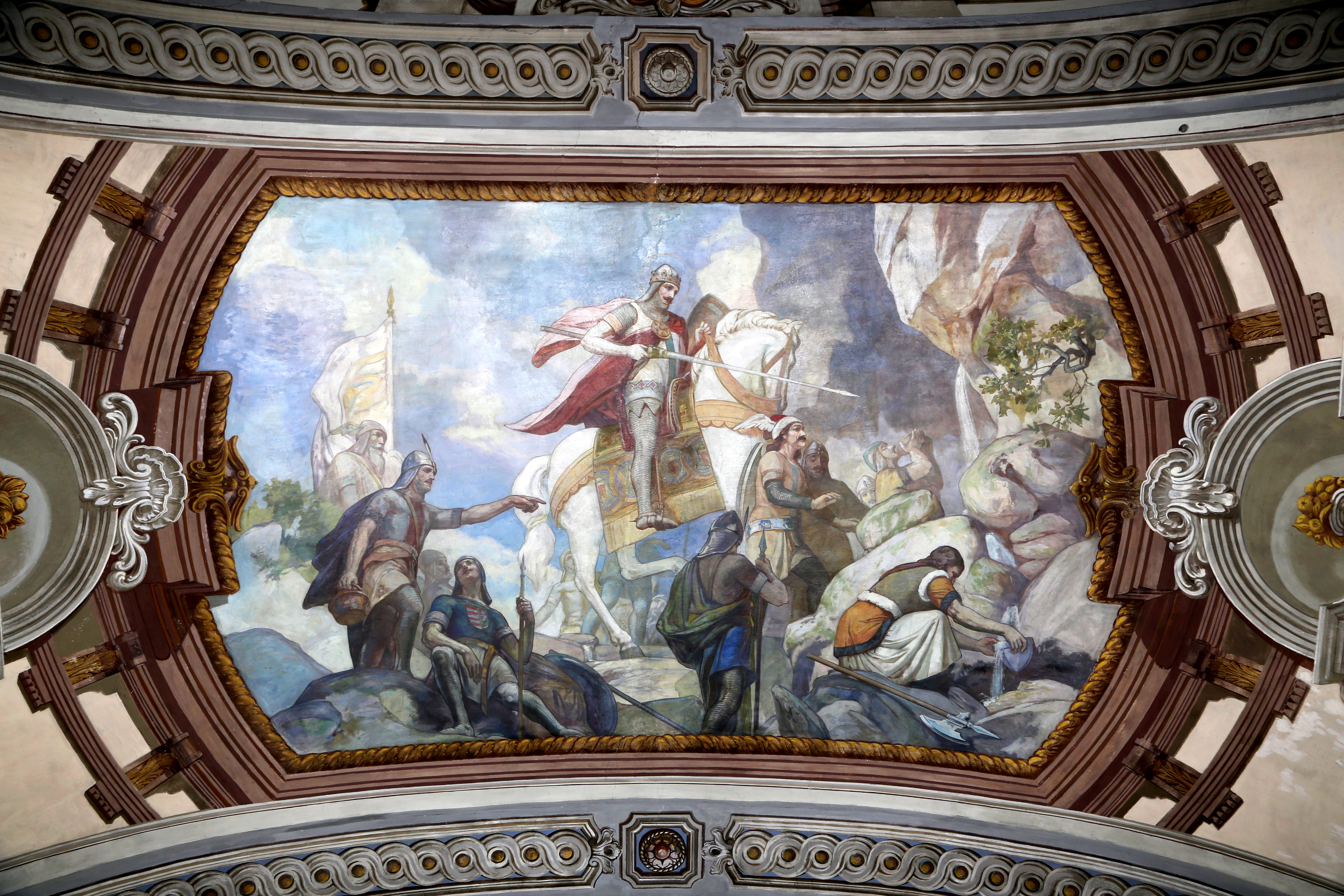
Saint Ladislaus fresco in Szentkút
