= Hatvan–Fiľakovo railway =

Railway line in Slovakia and Hungary

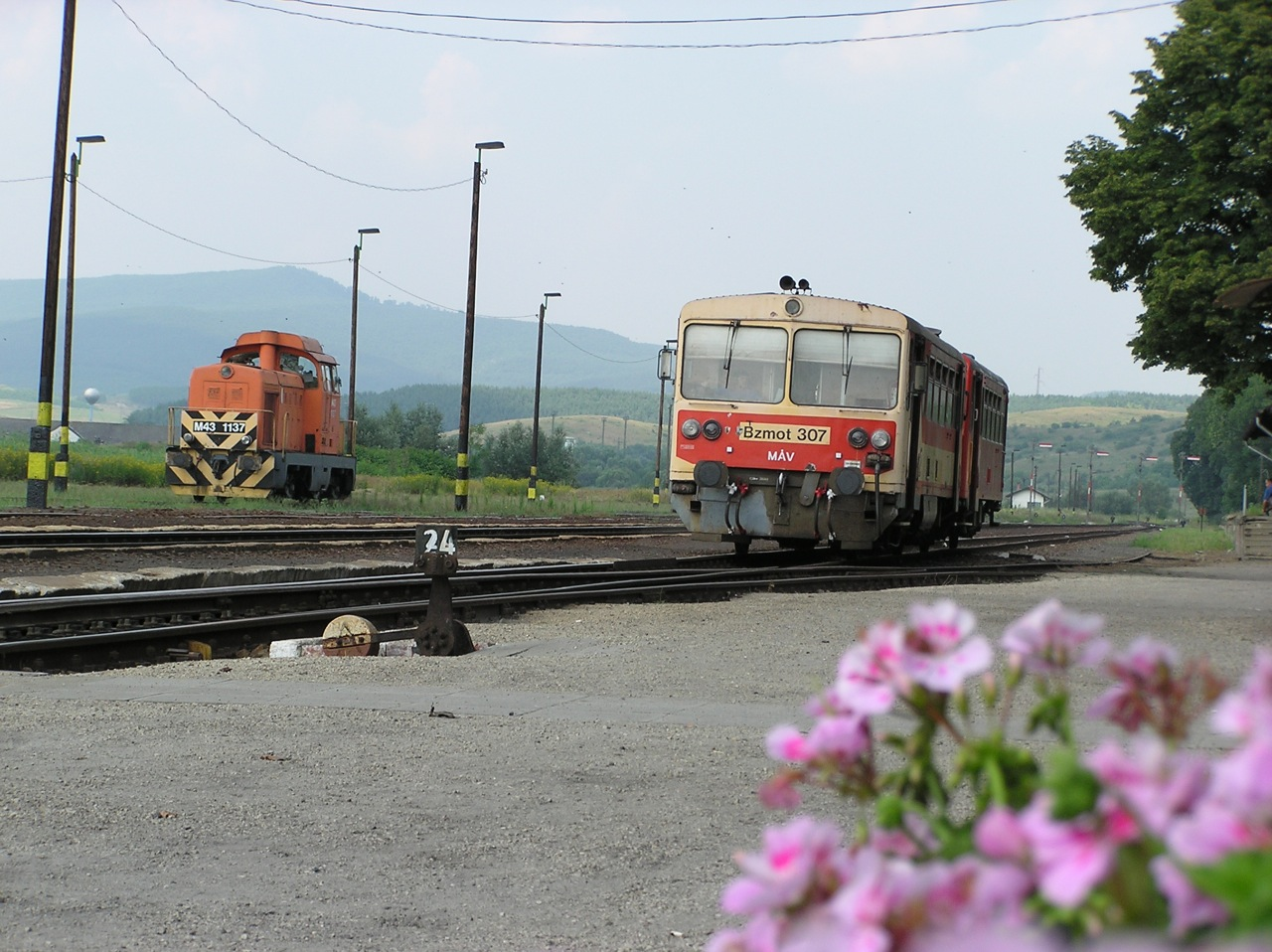
- Bzmot motor coach at Kisterenye

Overview
- Other name: Hatvan–Fülek railway line
- Status: Operational
- Owner: MÁV & ŽSR
- Line number: 81 in Hungary; 164 in Slovakia
- Locale: International
- Termini: Hatvan; Fiľakovo
- Stations: 12 stations & 9 stops
- Website: Timetable in Hungary

Service
- Operator: MÁV
- Depot: Hatvan
- Daily ridership: 10
- Ridership: 15 (on workdays)

History
- Opened: 19 May 1867

Technical
- Line length: 77.973 km (48.450 mi)
- Number of tracks: 2 from Hatvan to Selyp; 1 from Selyp to Fiľakovo
- Track gauge: 1,435 mm (4 ft 8 1/2 in)
- Operating speed: 100 km/h (62 mph) Hatvan–Kisterenye; 90 km/h (56 mph) Kisterenye–Somoskőújfalu; 80 km/h (50 mph) Somoskőújfalu–Fiľakovo
Route map

Hatvan–Fiľakovo railway is a non-electrified railway connecting Hatvan, Hungary with Fiľakovo, Slovakia. Once a major connecting railway, the line currently sees only local Regionalbahn service and local goods traffic. It is double tracked from Hatvan to Selyp, then single tracked for the remainder of the distance to Fiľakovo. It is a class 3 passenger and goods line from Hatvan to Salgótarján, then becomes a class 4 line from there to Fiľakovo. The line has utilized clock-face scheduling operation since 2008, when direct express train connecting service with Budapest ended. The Hungarian portion is designated as line 81 and the Slovak portion is line 164.

== History ==
The construction of the Pest–Salgótarján railway line was started by the Saint Stephen Coal Mining Company in 1863. The company was founded by railroad engineer Johann Brellich and mining engineer Gregor Windsteig. Their goal is to connect the Nógrád coal deposits with the capital. The railway line between Pest and Hatvan was completed in 1867, this is part of today's (No. 80) Budapest–Miskolc railway line and between Hatvan and Salgótarján. The Salgótarján Coal Mine Corporation was established, which became the largest mining company in the country. The railway construction company declared bankruptcy in 1868, so the line was taken over by the Hungarian State Railways (MÁV), whose first line it was. The continuation of the line was handed over to Lučenec in 1871, the Fiľakovo–Lučenec section of which is part of today's (Nr. 160) Zvolen–Košice line. The Salgótarján railway station, today's "Salgótarján outer", was in the southern part of the city, the stop in the city center was opened in 1913. The railway reservoir suppliers are the lignite mines and the factories of the settlements. Plans were made to electrify the railway line in 1917, but this was no longer realized. In the Hungarian–Czechoslovak War the ownership of coal mines became an important issue, and the Hungarian side also used armoured train in the fighting. The national border was changed several times: 1920-1924: between Salgótarján and Somoskőújfalu, 1924-1938: between Somoskőújfalu and Šiatorská Bukovinka. After 1938, the entire line once again belonged to Hungary. On May 7, 1939, the Golden Train carrying Holy Right of Saint Stephen was also taken to Salgótarján on this line. The originally two-track railway suffered serious damage in the Second World War. Today's border was established on the basis of the Paris Peace of 1947 and again crosses the railway line between Somoskőújfalu and Šiatorská Bukovinka. For strategic reasons, the line was rebuilt on only one track. In international traffic, before 1918 the Budapest–Berlin train, and after 1945 the Warsaw–Belgrade train, was the most significant. The last international express train (Budapest–Zvolen) was discontinued in 2008. In 2011, the Slovak side stopped the passenger transport between Fiľakovo and Somoskőújfalu, and thus the international passenger transport ceased. The exhaustion of the mines and the lack of a second track contributed to the decline in traffic on the line. Several industrial railways were established in connection with the stations of the line, which mostly existed on a narrow gauge. Unique among them was the 6 km long cog railway to the Somlyó mining site established by the Salgótarján Iron Refinery Corporation in 1881, as well as a cable car.

== Engineering facts ==
The Belgian Cockerill’s locomotives were the first on the railway line till the 1920s. It was changed to MÁV Class 424 and later to MÁV Class 411 series. In the 1980s there came the first diesel engine locomotives, such as MÁV Class M40 and M62 locomotive series. They were used for passenger and freight trains respectively. There was a time when there ran some MÁV Class M41 trains as well. Since the change of the timetable in 2008, there run MÁV Class 6341 units on the line, which belong to the Engineering Office of Szentes. M62 locomotive are used for freight transport, and MÁV Class M41 were moved to the Szentes. There are several types of signalling controls at the line. Domino55, a production of Telephone Factory of Budapest based on the license of Integra Signum and Siemens is in use between Selyp and Hatvan, but it may be found at Salgótarján külső and Somoskőújfalu as well. Here guards are changed automatically, and traffic lights are guarded ones. At Apc-Zagyvaszántó, Pásztó, Nagybátony and Kisterenye stations guards are Siemens & Halske type. The level crossings are mostly insured. At stations of Szurdokpüspöki, Tar and Zagyvapálfalva railroad switch are locally usable.

== Attractions near the line ==
- Old part of Hollókő, part of World Heritage Sites is near Pásztó station.
- Mátraszentimre is a ski resort place, near to Pásztó station
- Castle ruins of Hasznos, near Mátraszőlős-Hasznos stop
- Stupa of Sándor Kőrösi Csoma, near Tar station
- National place of worship in Szentkút, near Mátraverebély stop
- Gyürky-Solymossy Castle is in front of the Kisterenye station.
- Castle of Somoskő and Salgó Castle, near Somoskőújfalu station
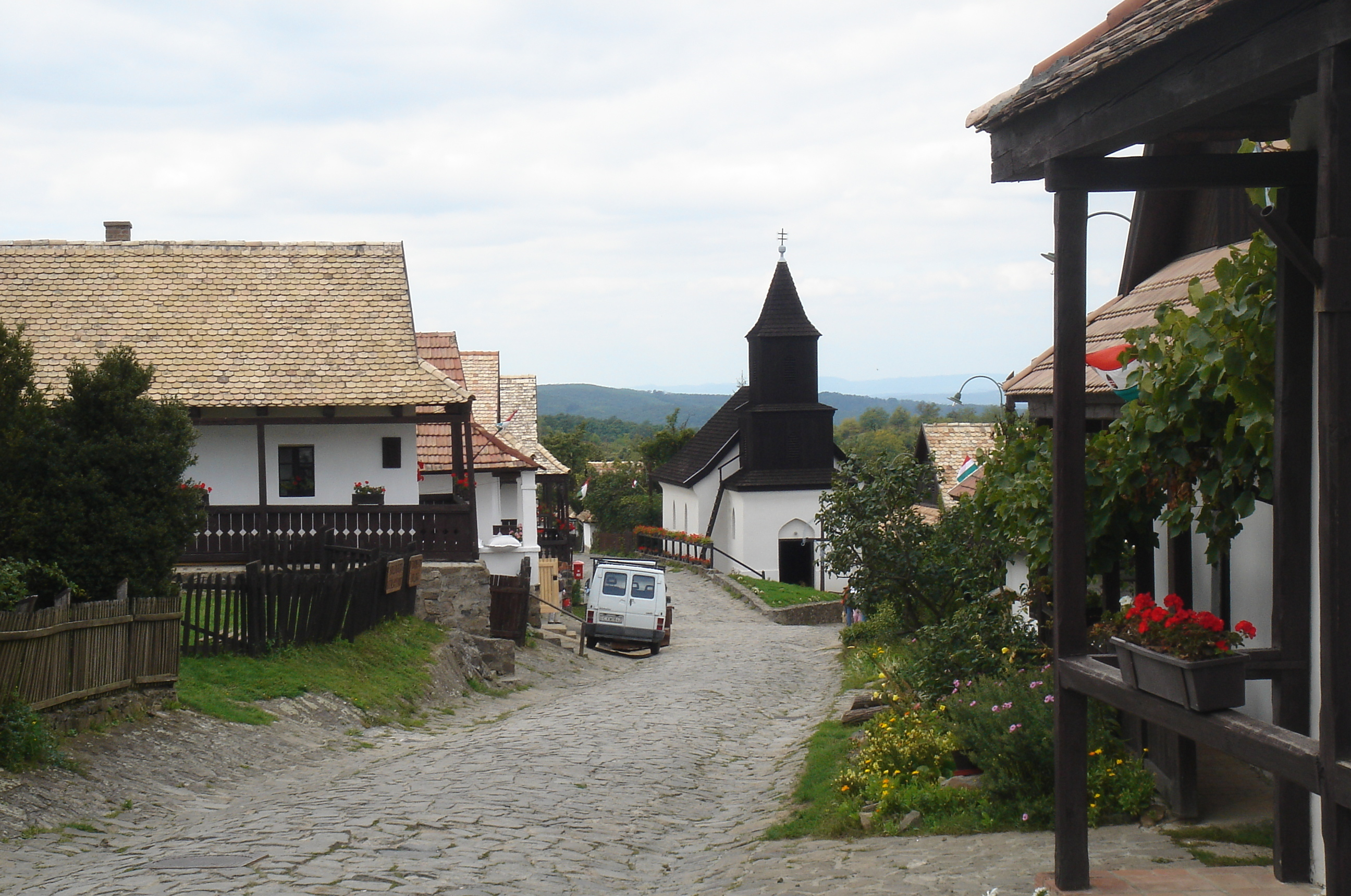
Hollókő

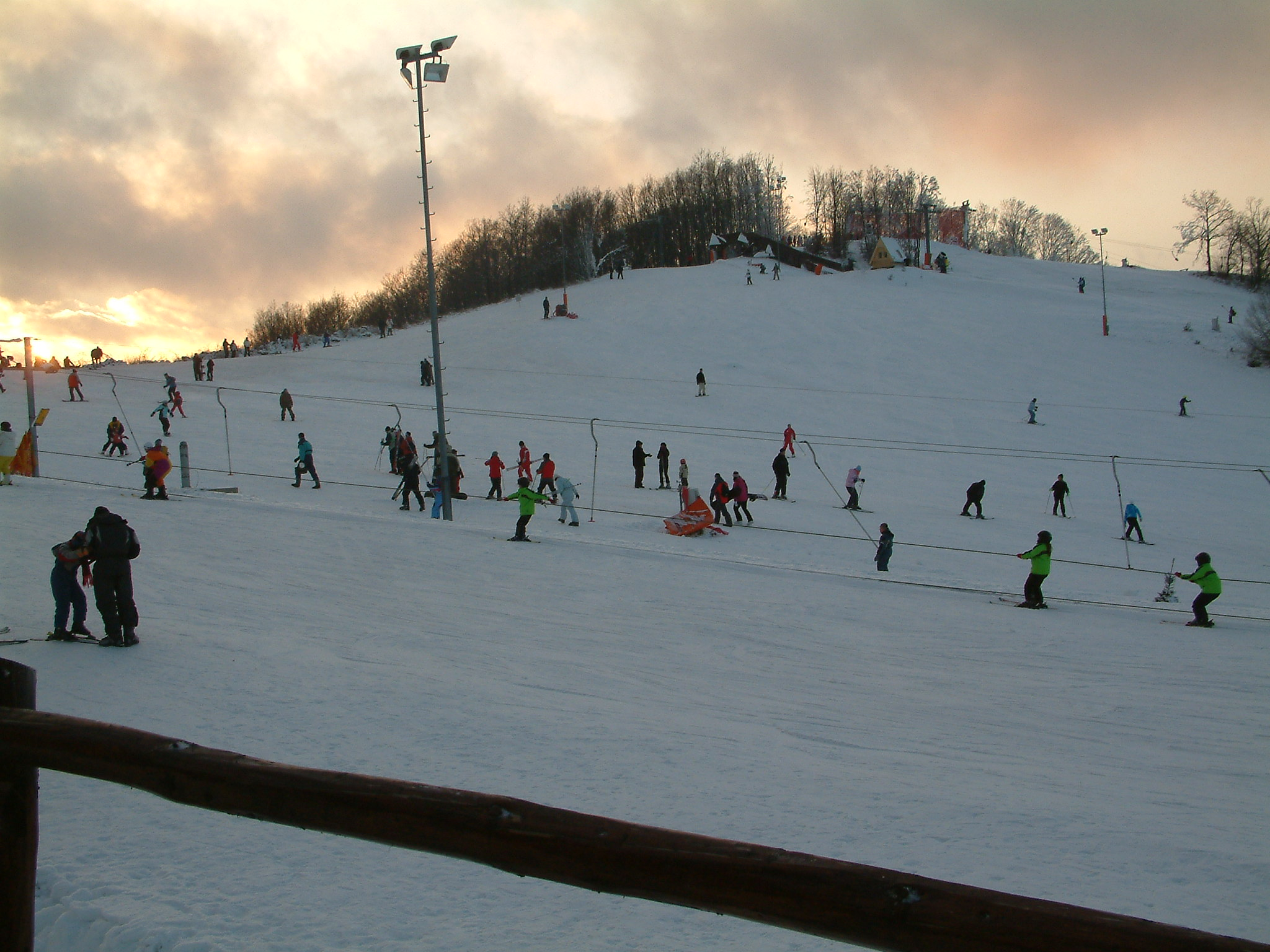
Ski resort

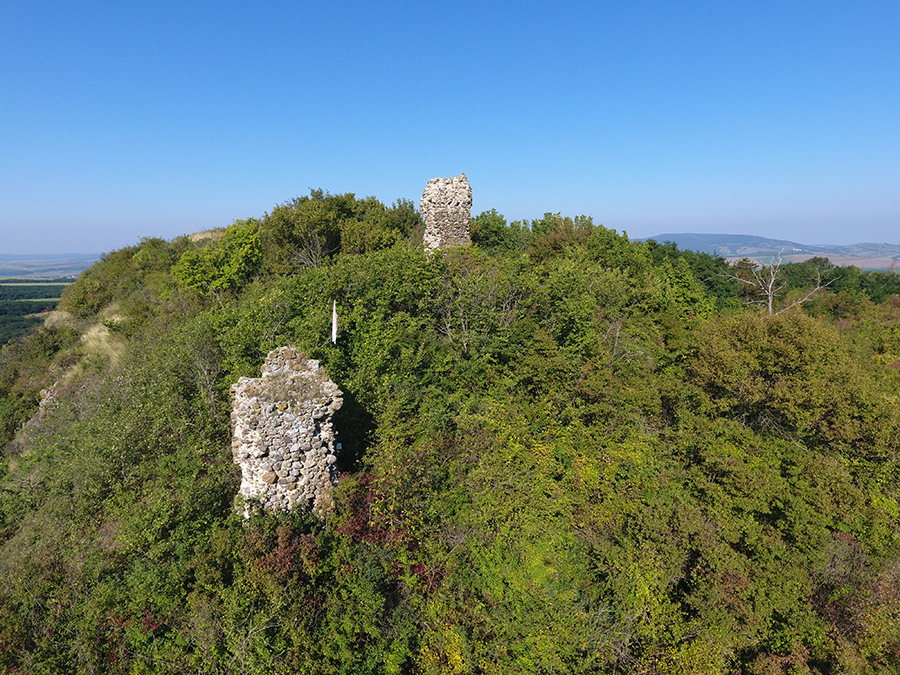
Hasznos castle ruins

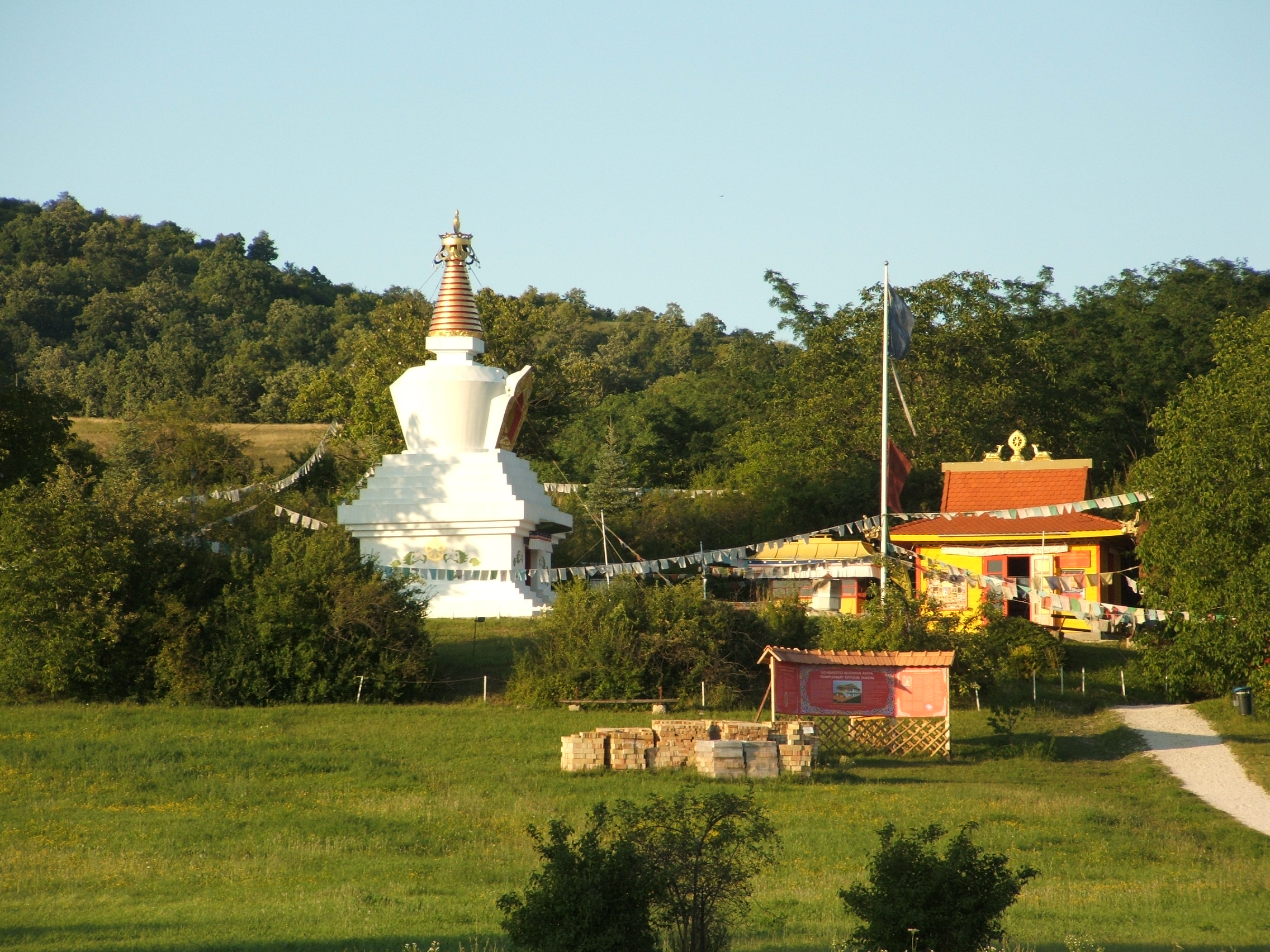
Stupa of Sándor Kőrösi Csoma

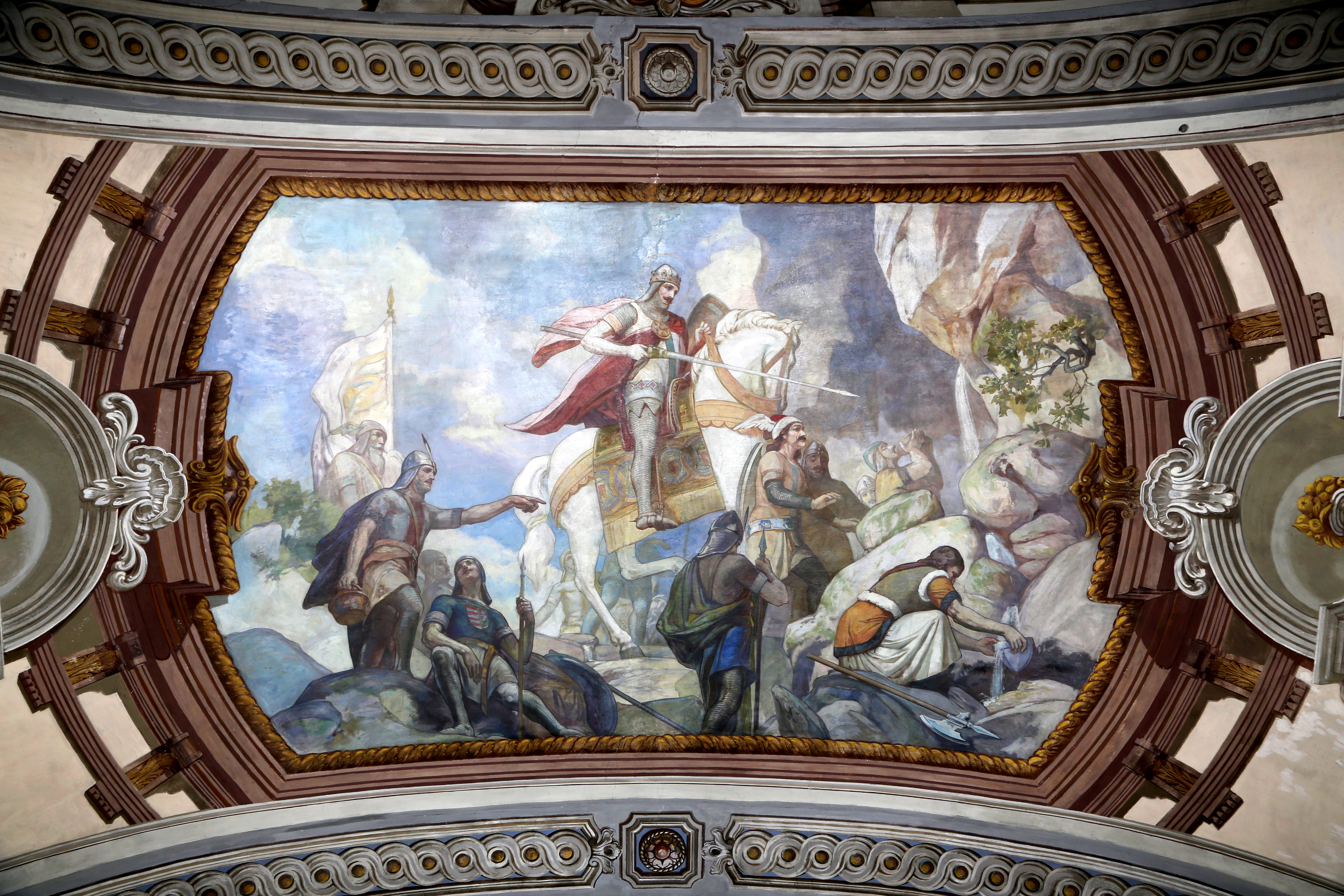
Szentkút

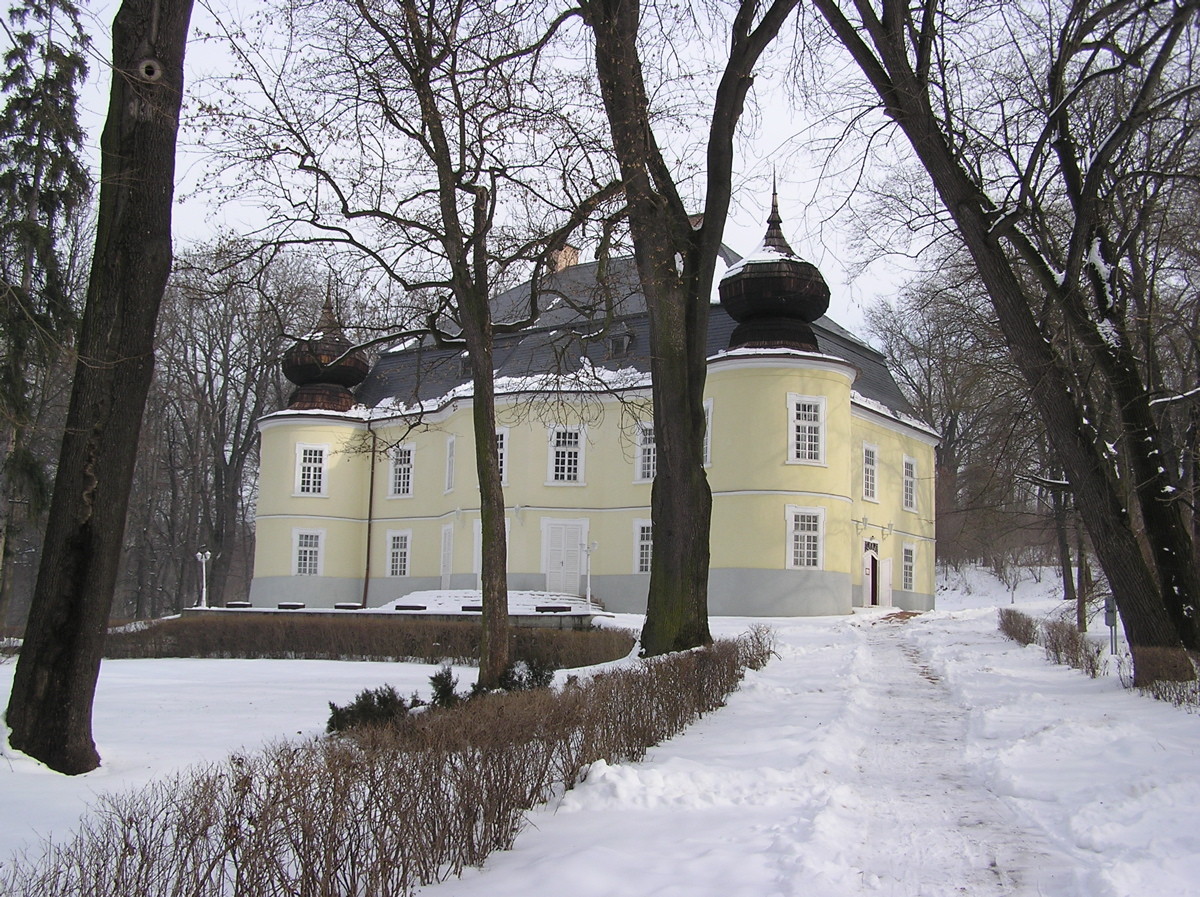
Gyürky-Solymossy Castle

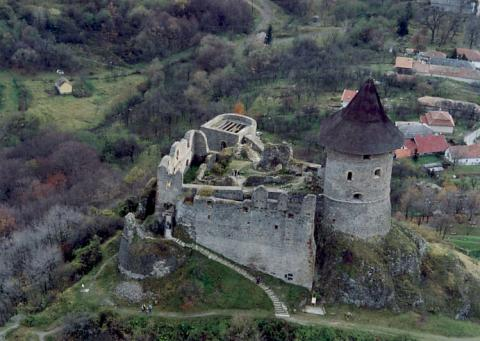
Castle of Somoskő

== Images ==
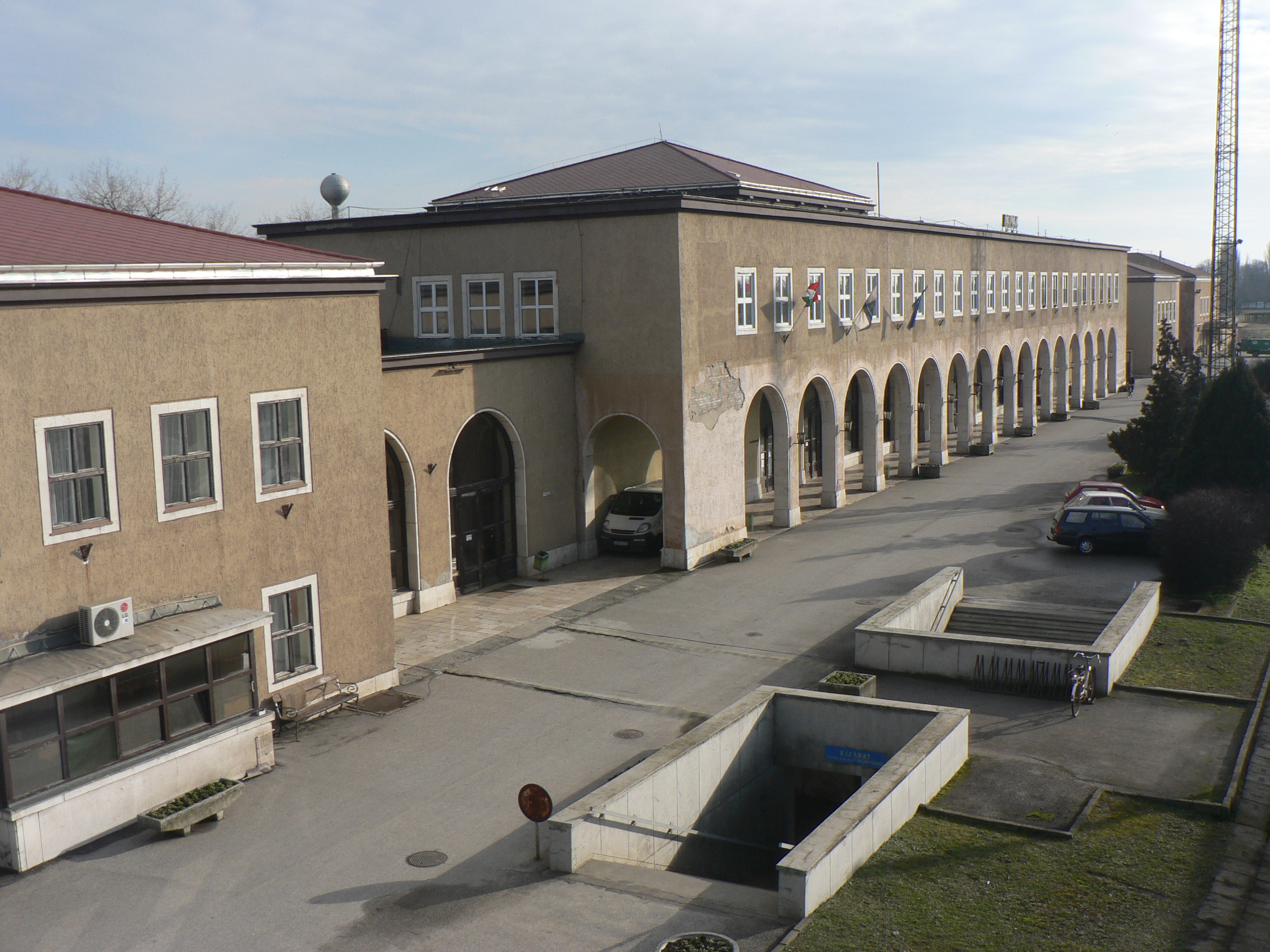
Hatvan station

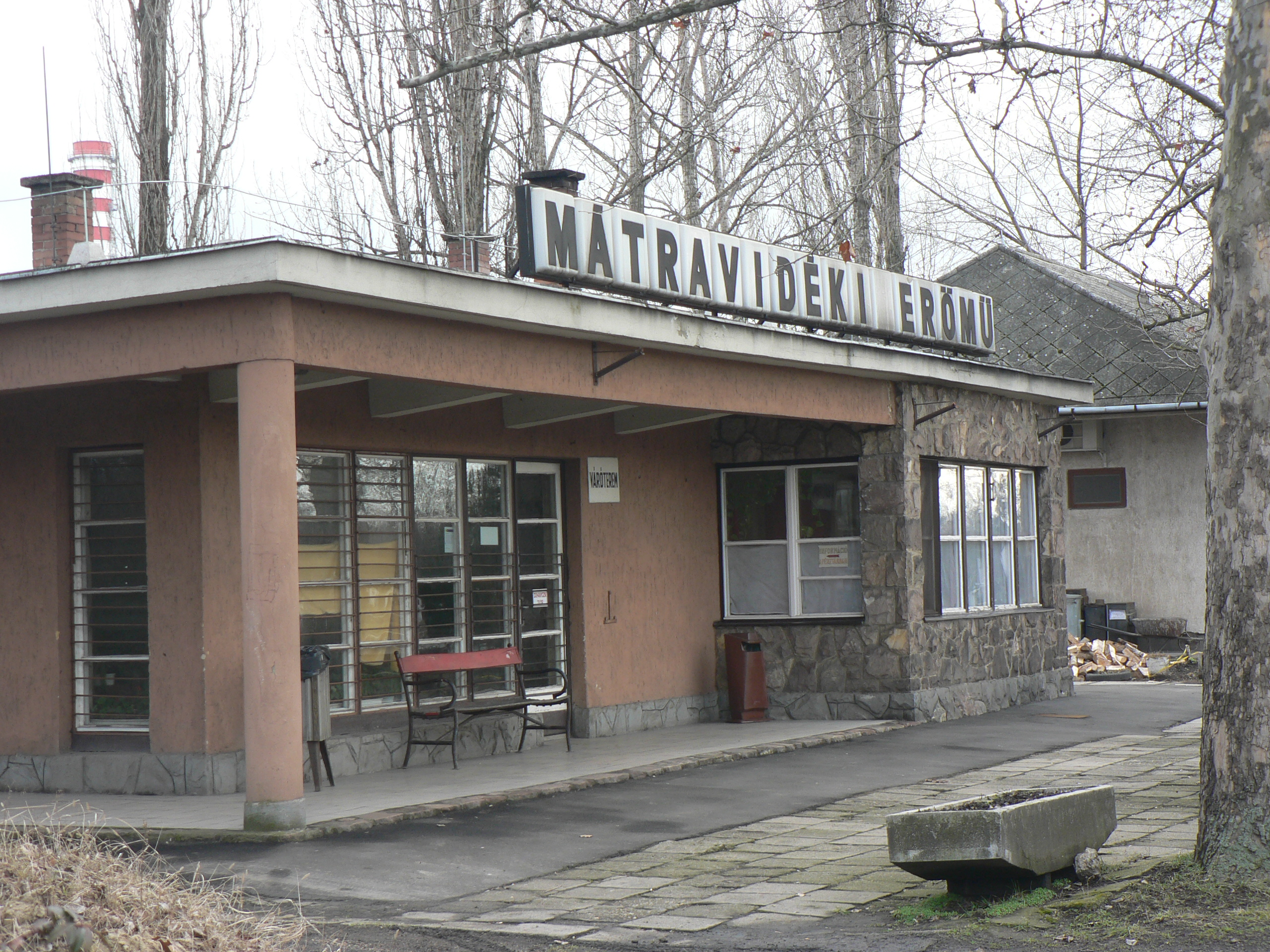
Mátravidék Power Plant station

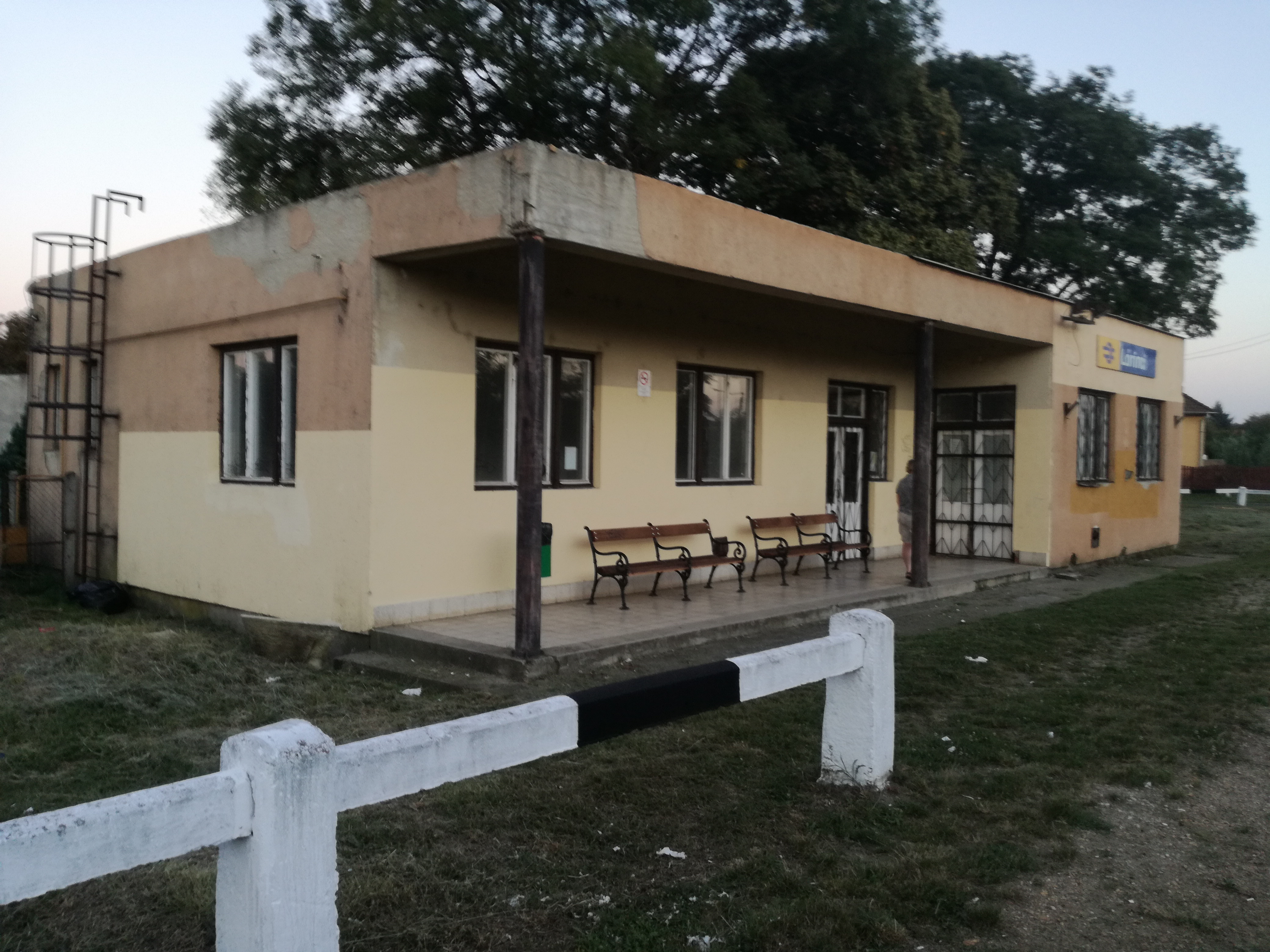
Lőrinci stop

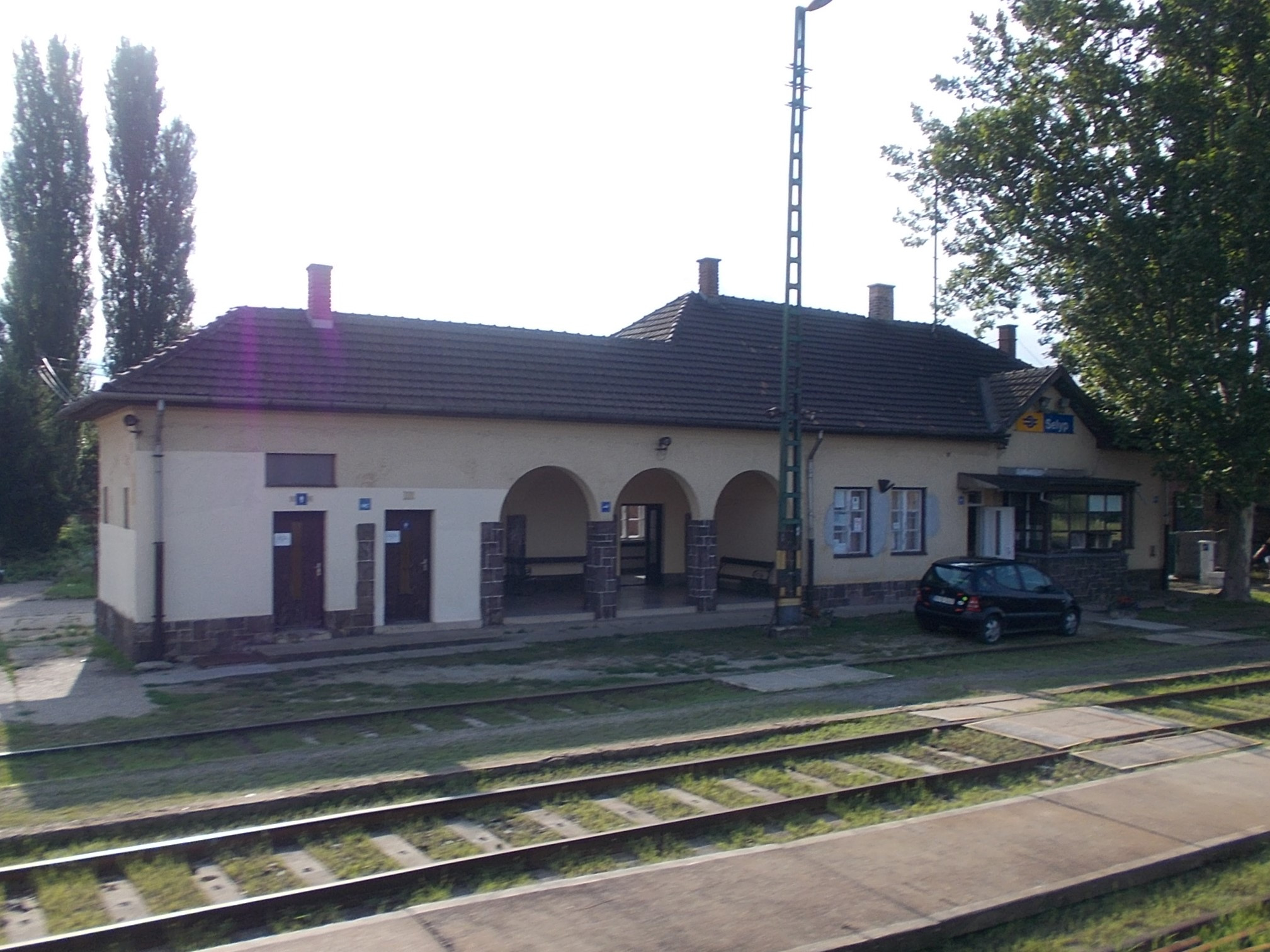
Selyp station

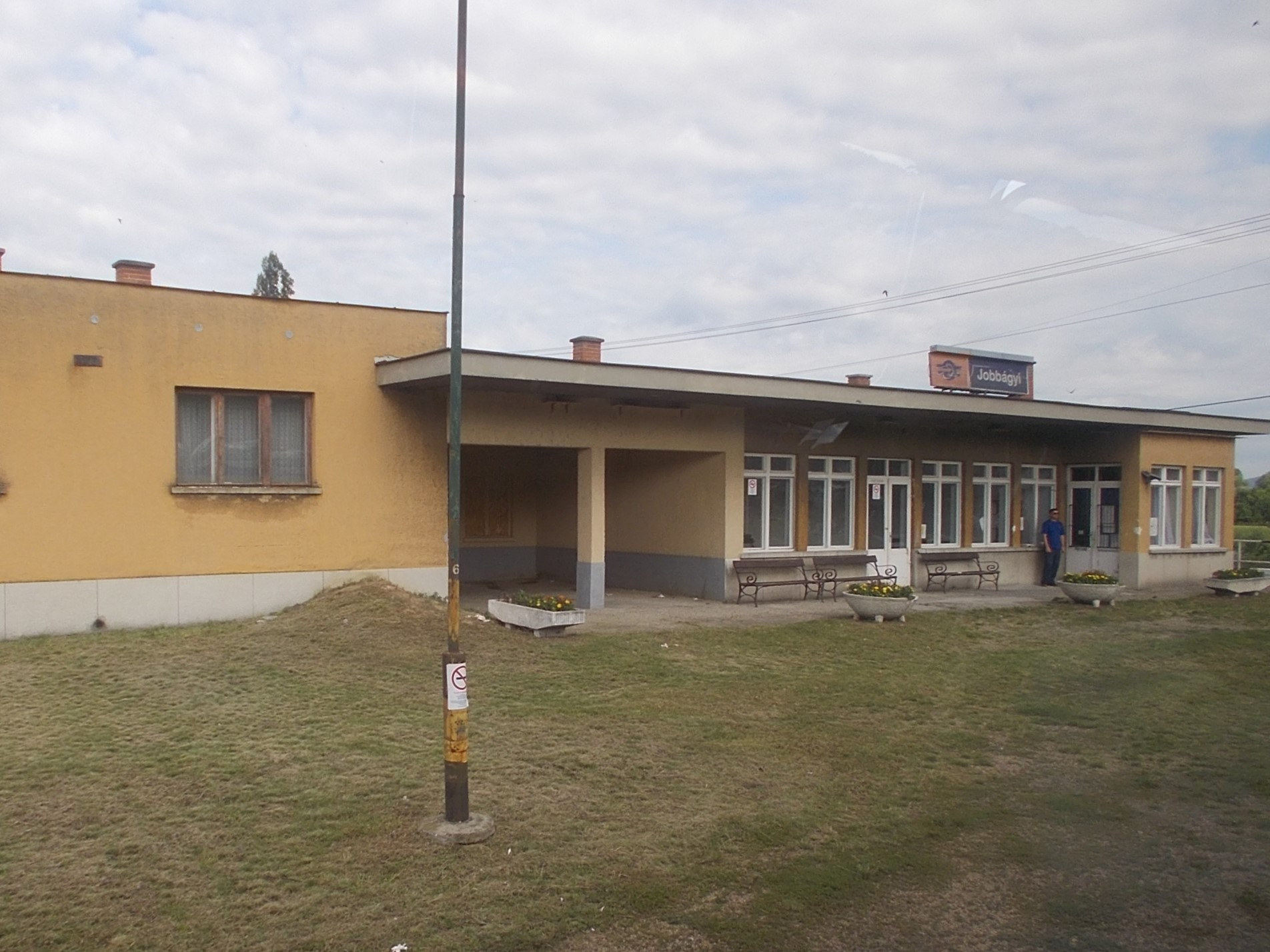
Jobbágyi stop

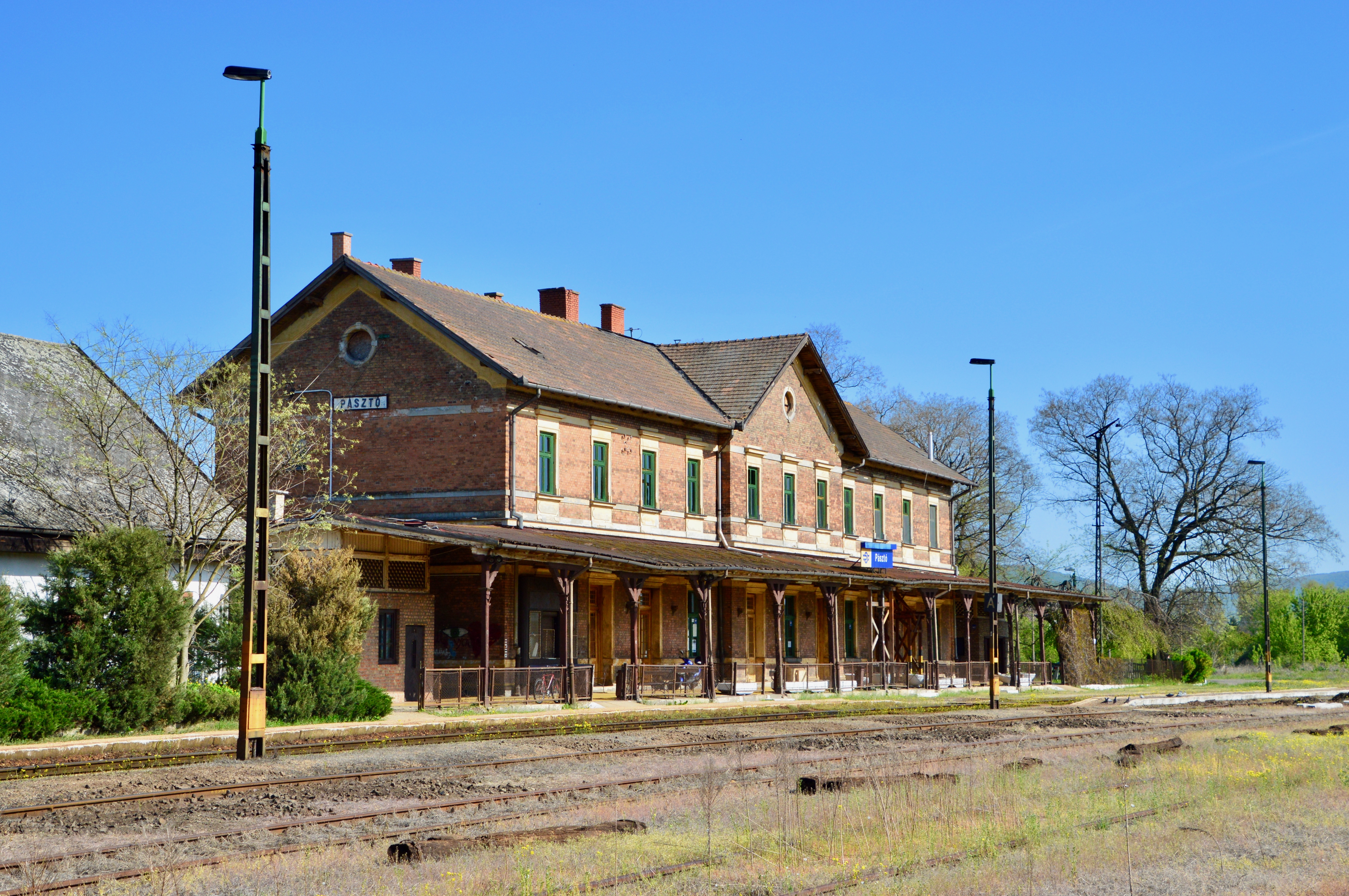
Pásztó station

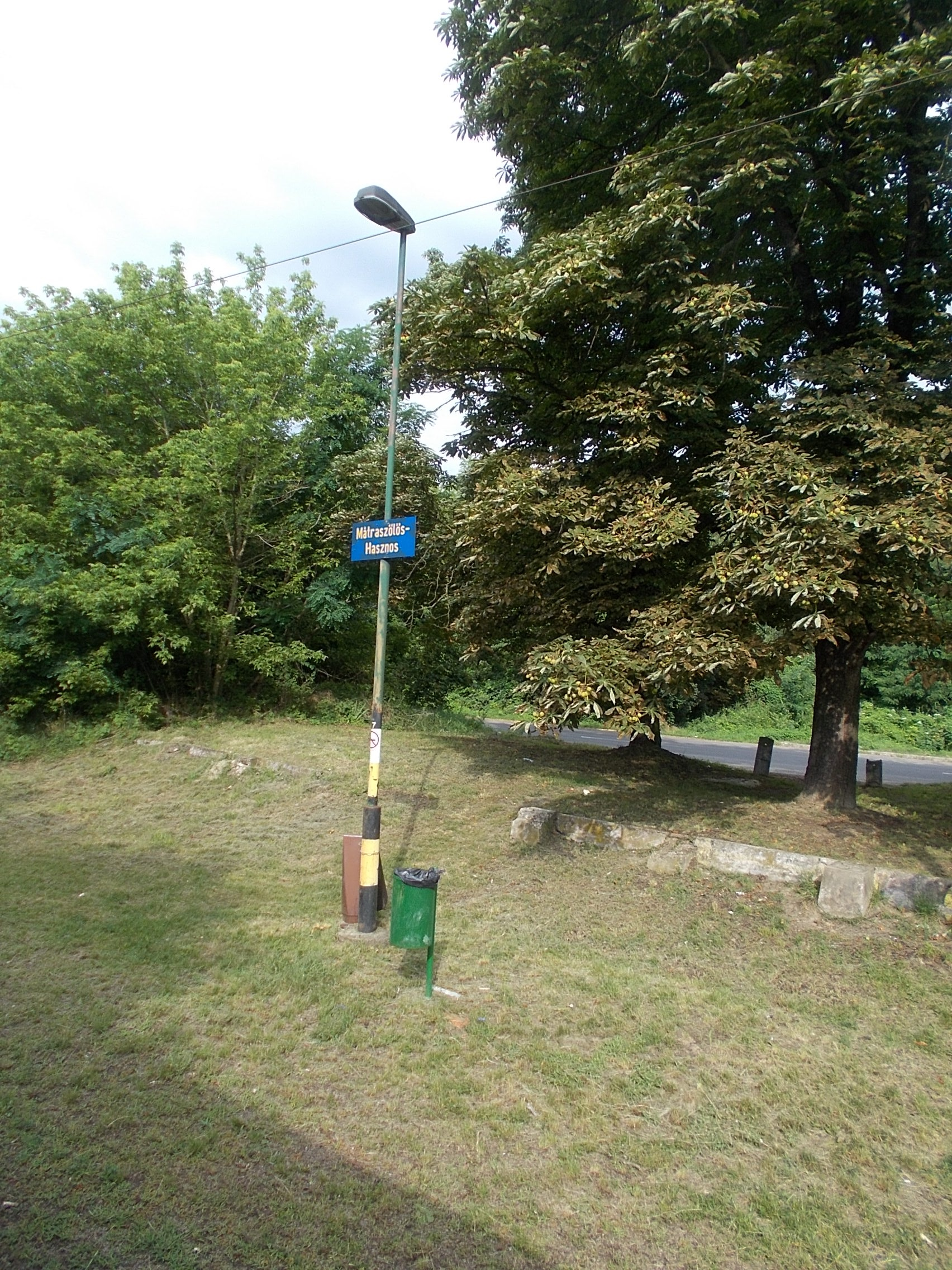
Mátraszőlős-Hasznos stop

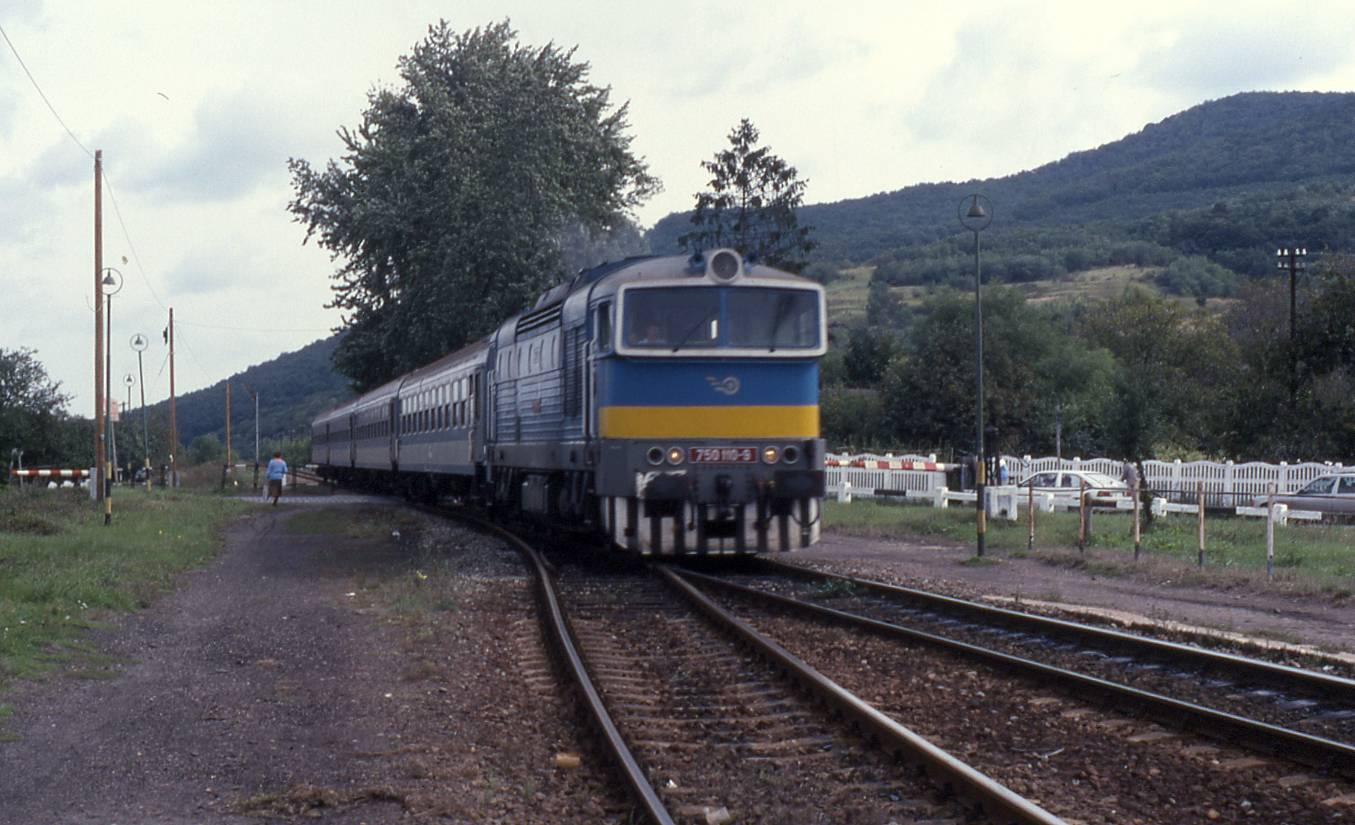
Tar station

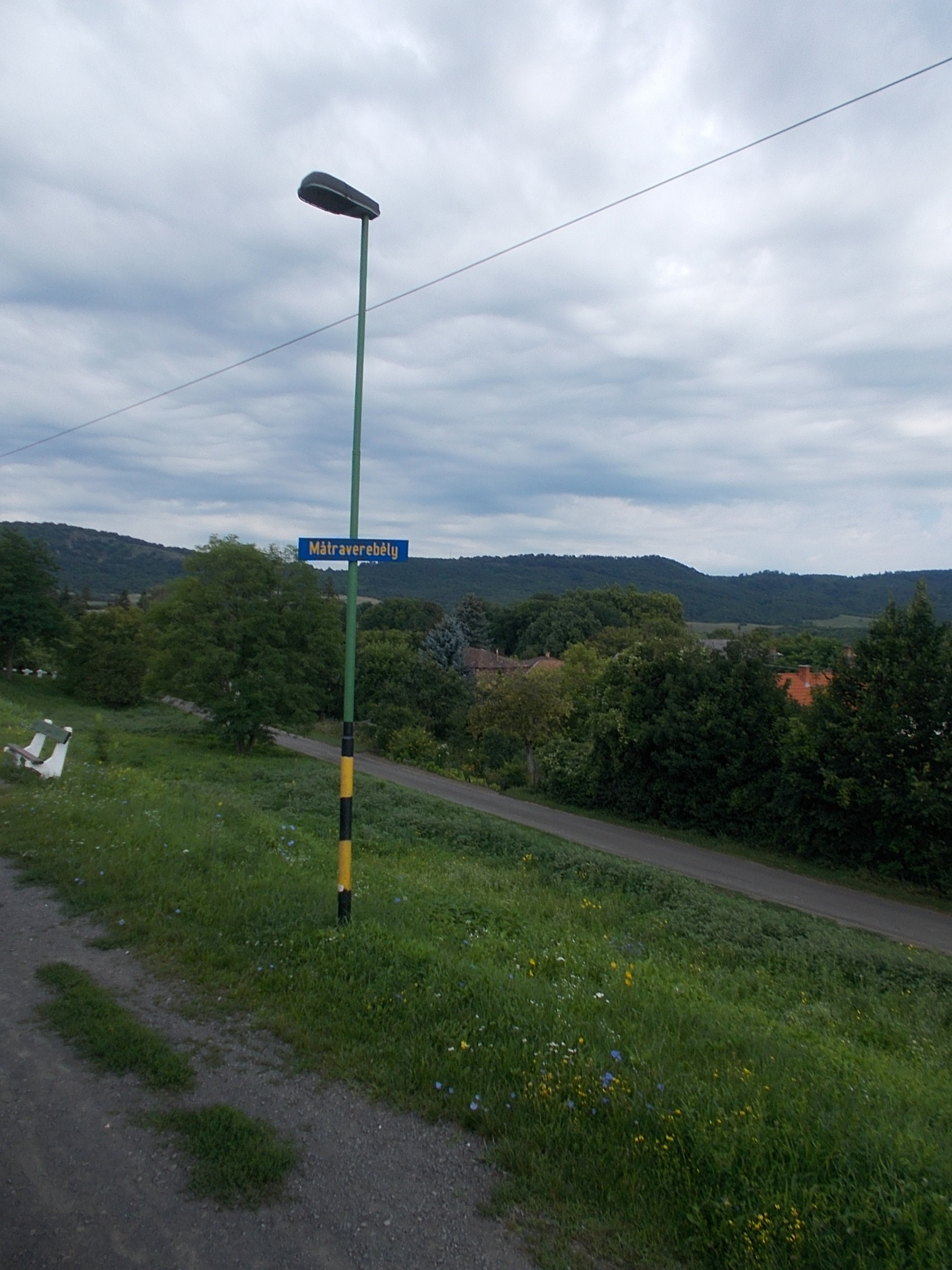
Mátraverebély stop

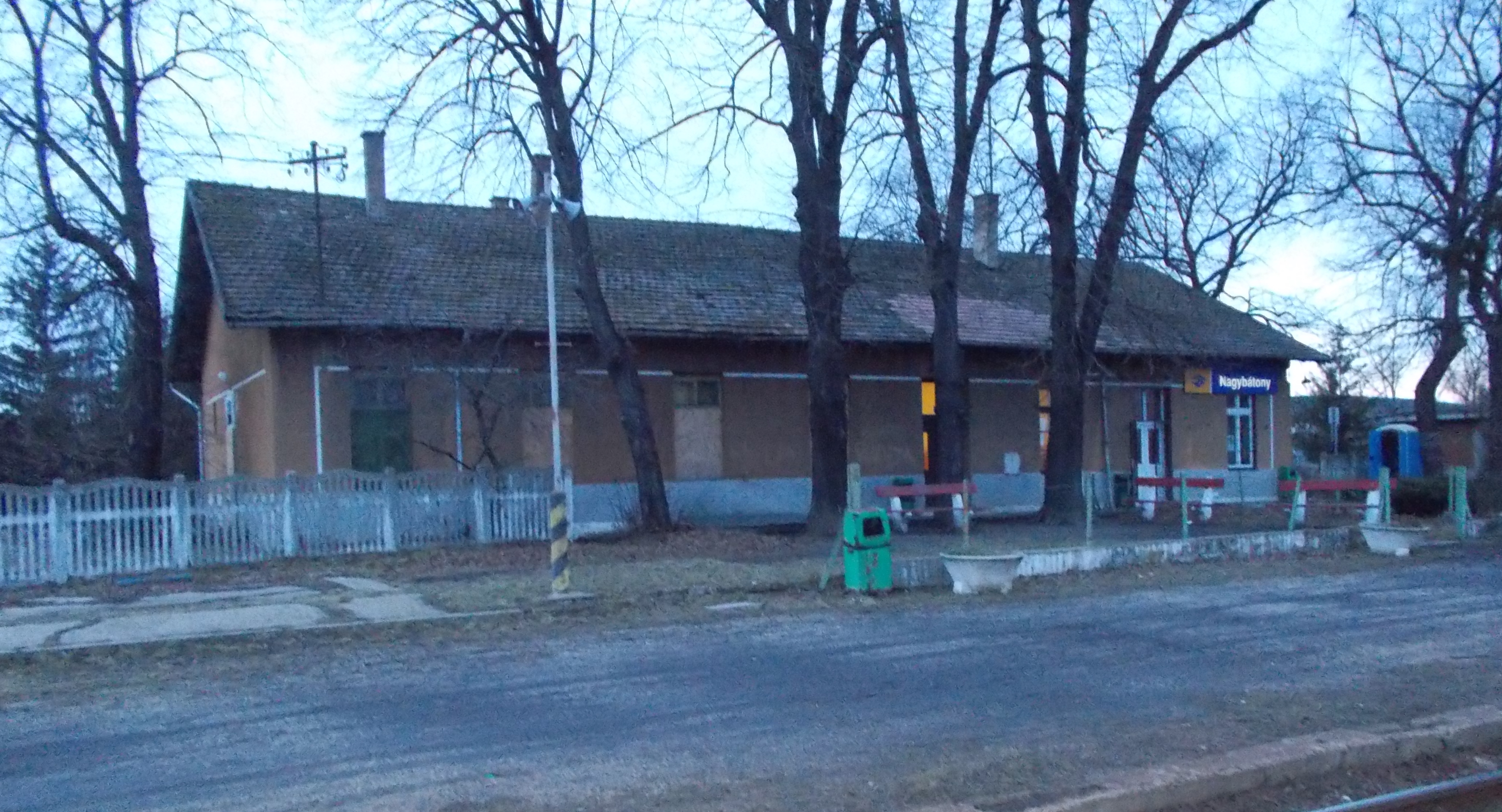
Nagybátony station

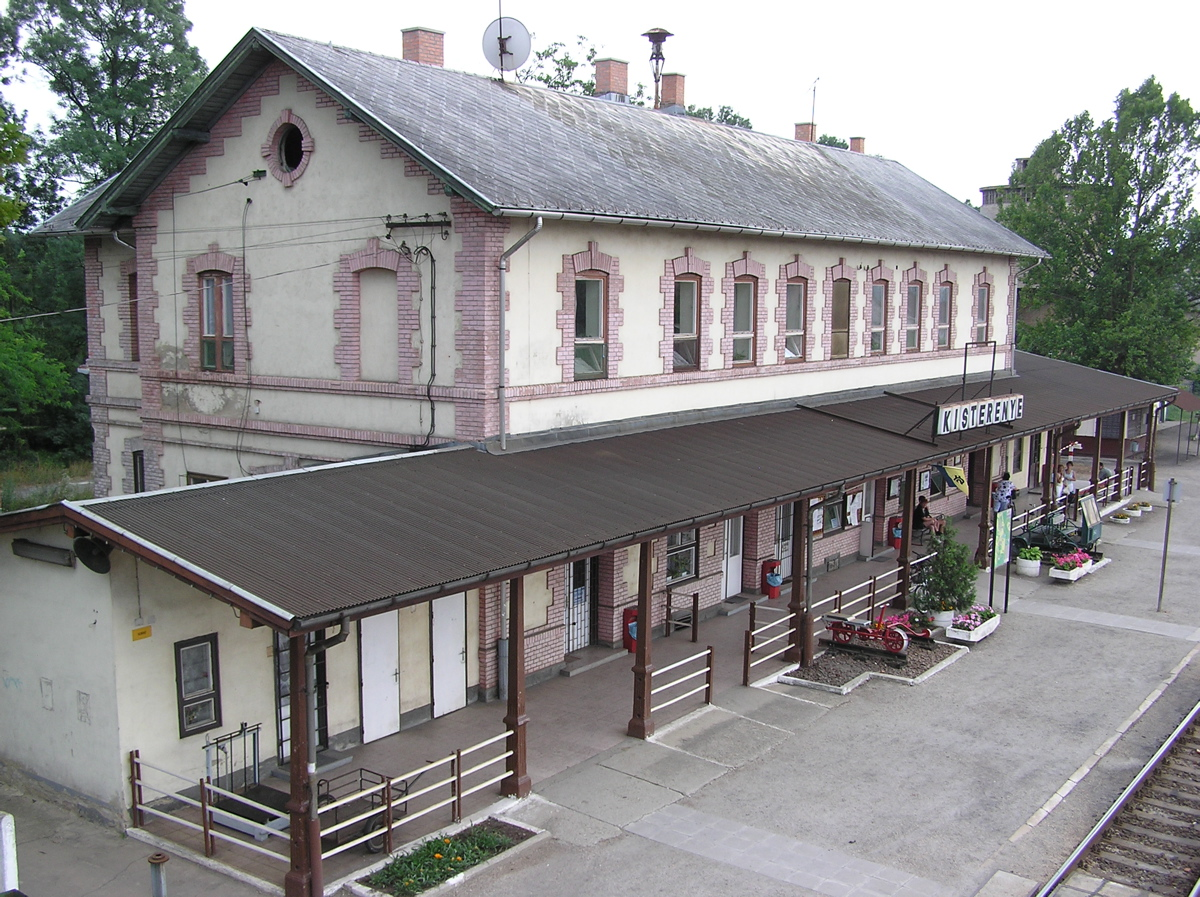
Kisterenye station

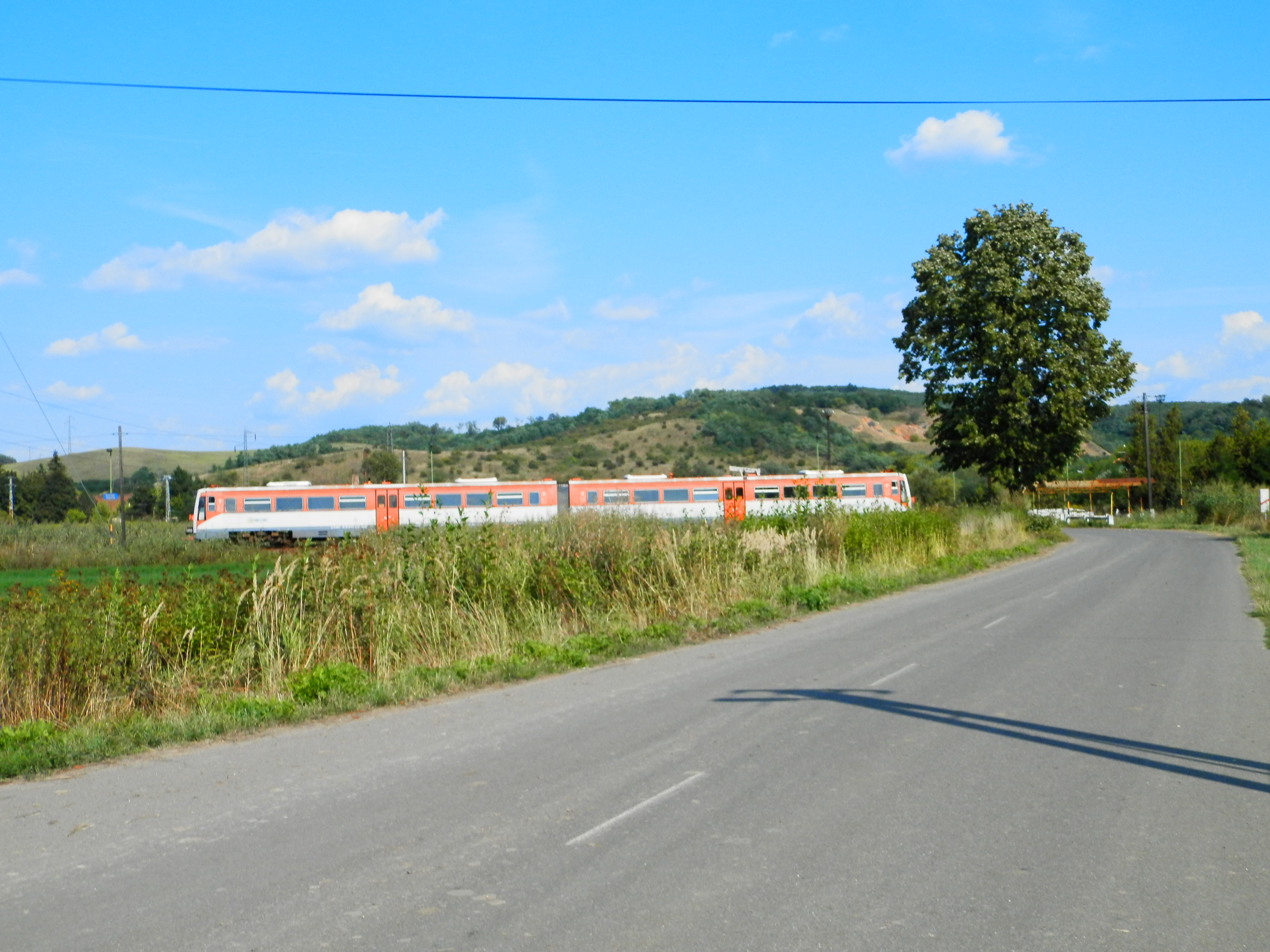
Kisterenye-Bányatelep stop

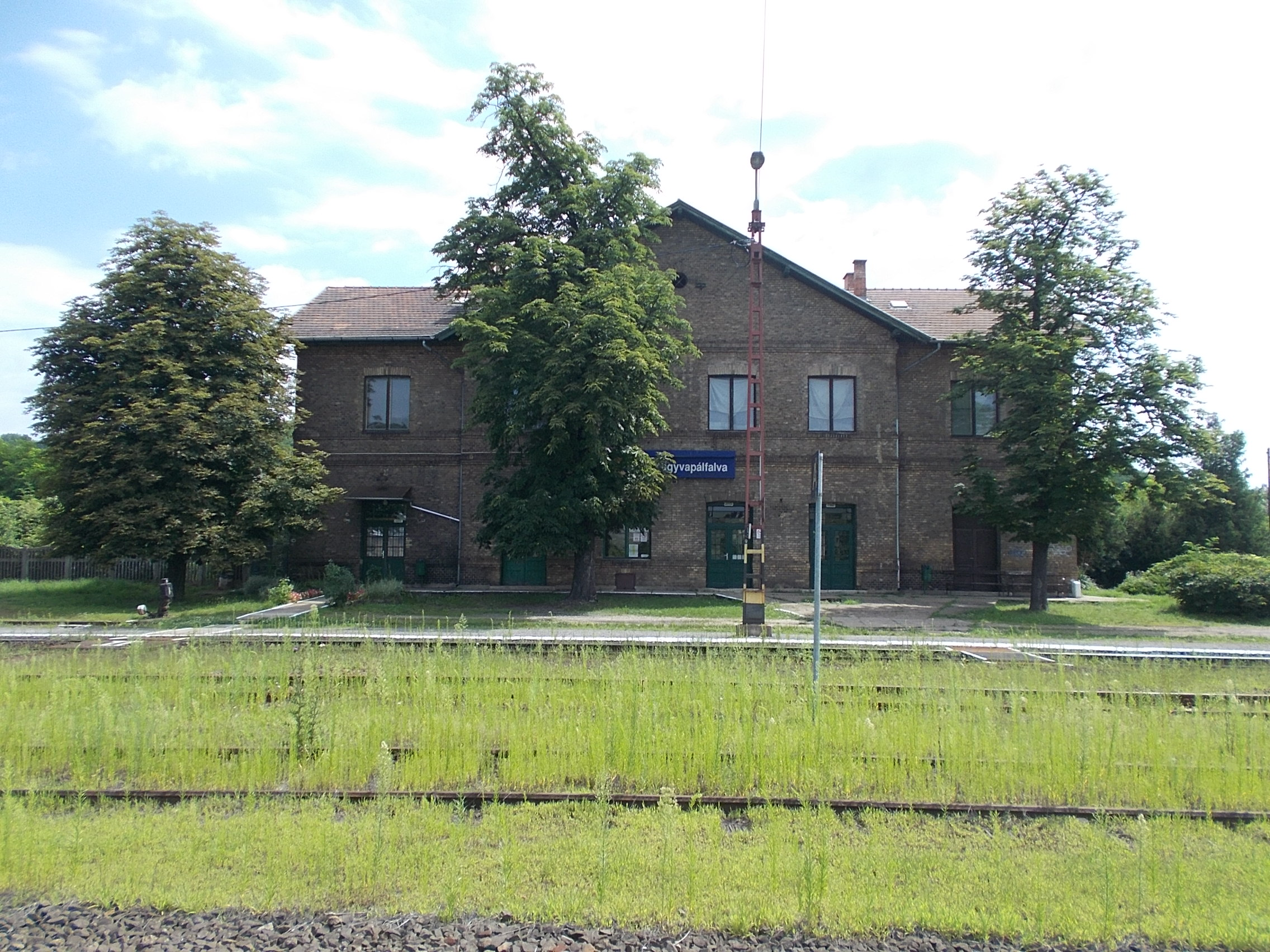
Zagyvapálfalva station

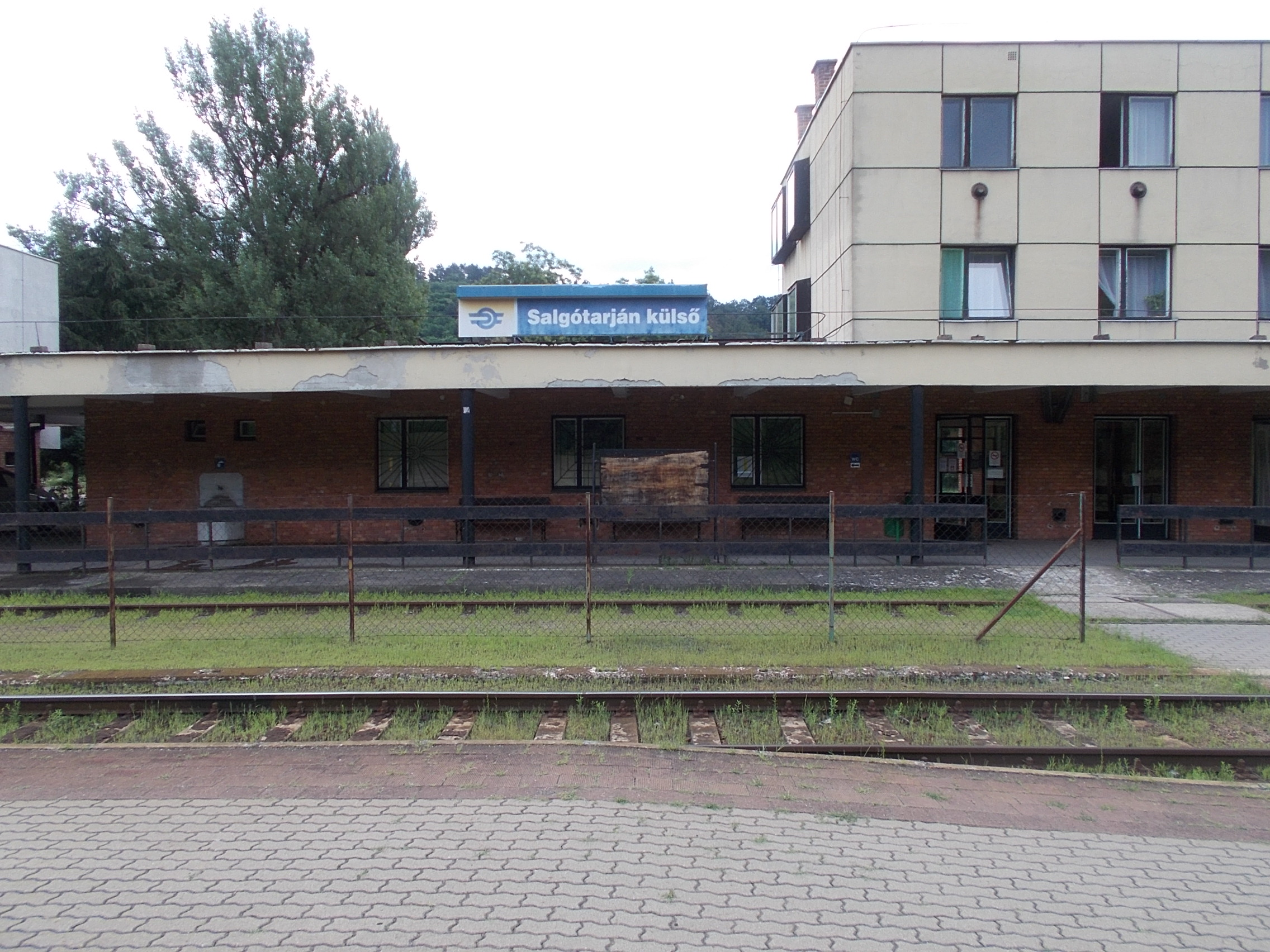
Salgótarján külső station

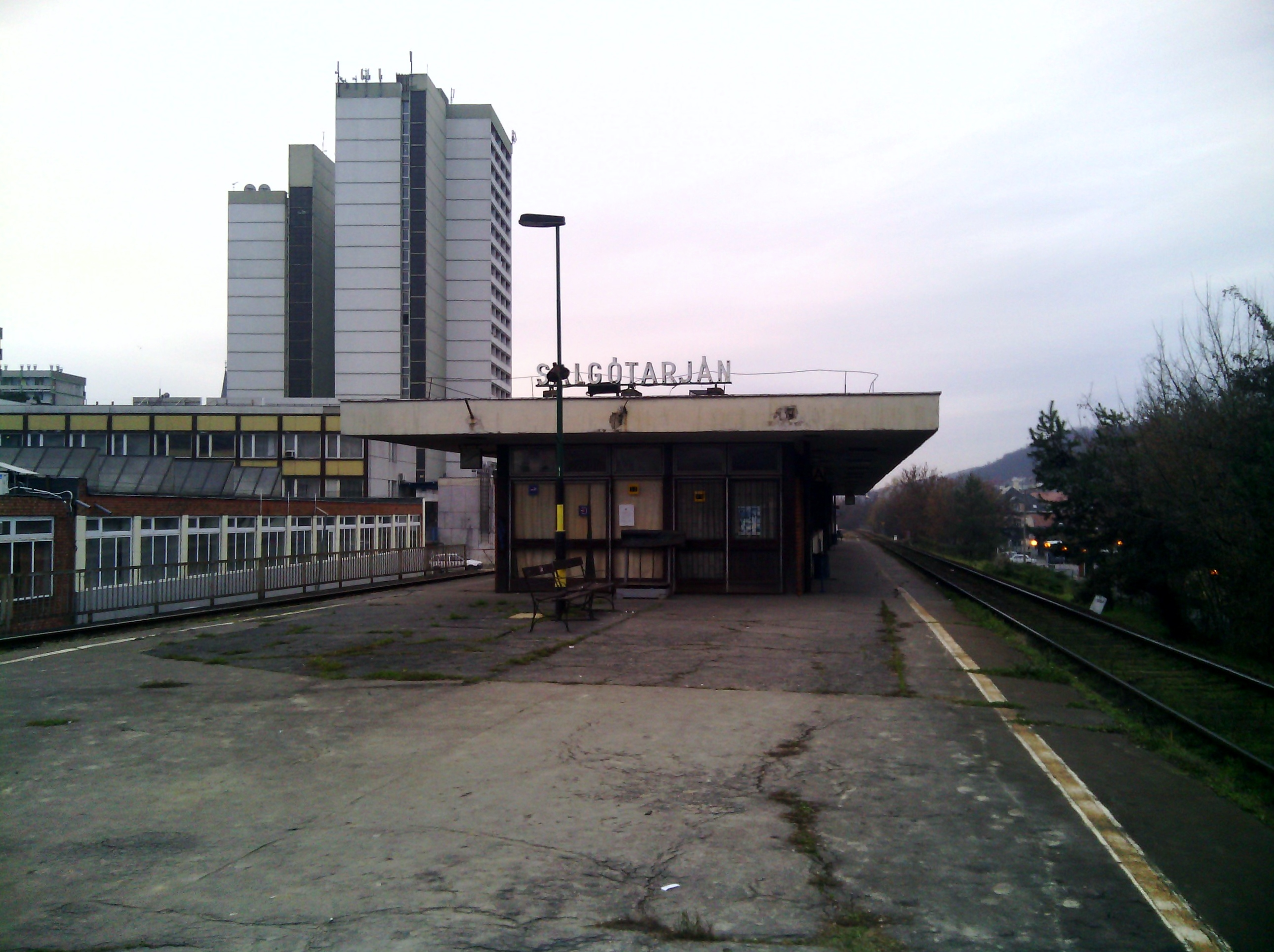
Salgótarján stop

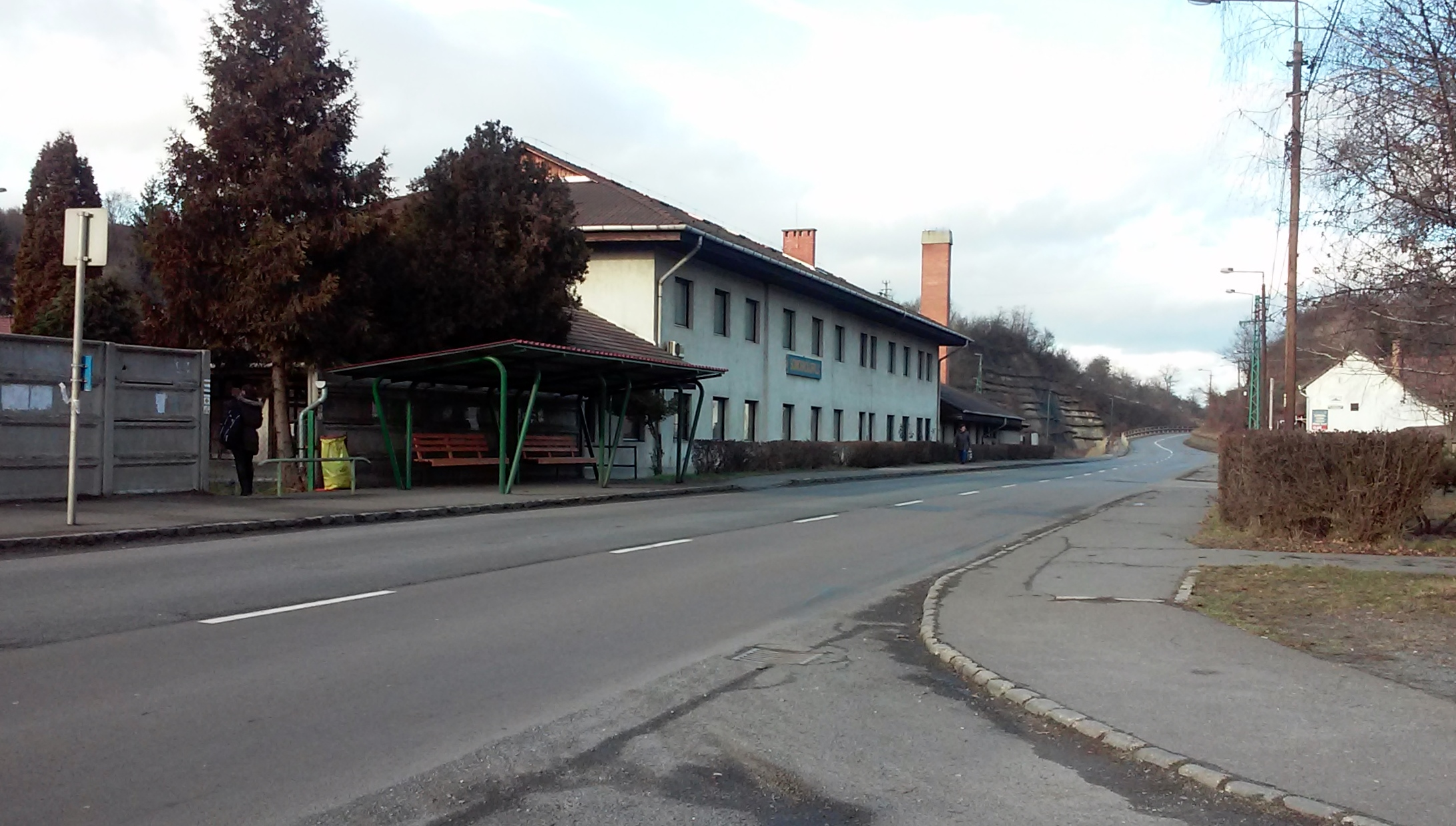
Somoskőújfalu station

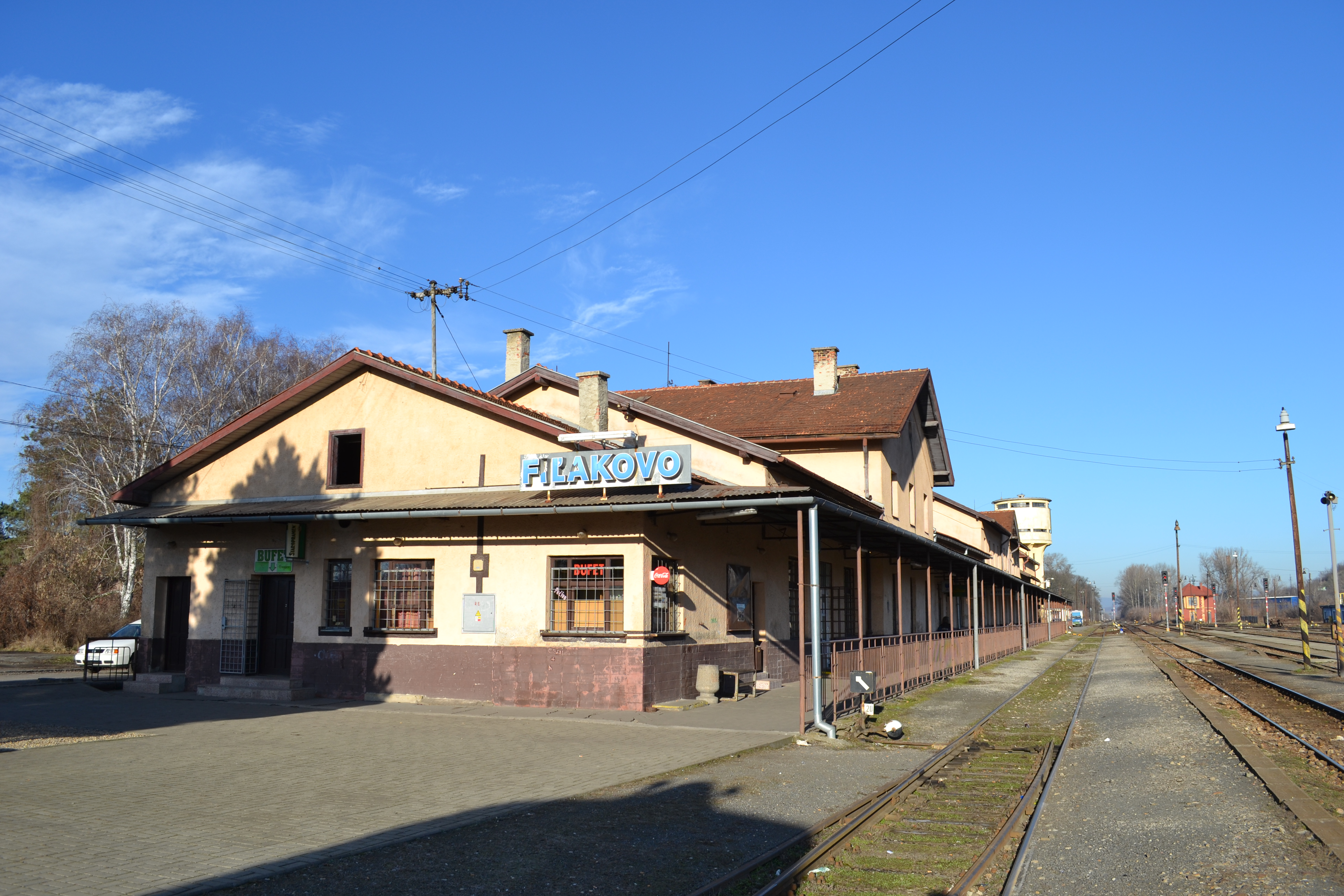
Fiľakovo station
