= Lőrinci =

- Town
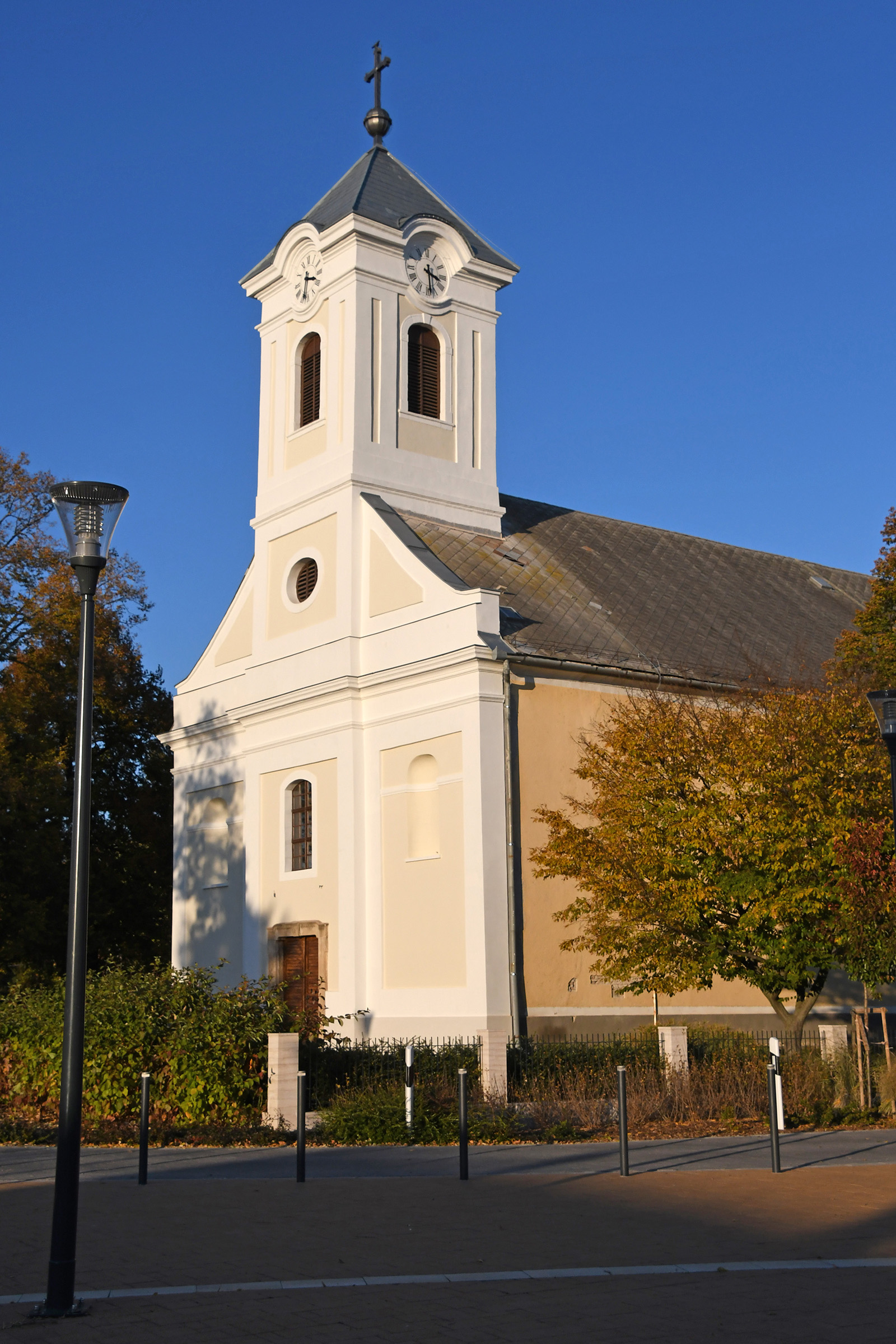
- Saint Michael church

- Flag Coat of arms

- Location in Hungary
- Coordinates: 47°44′16″N 19°40′43″E
- Country: Hungary
- County: Heves
- District: Hatvan
- First mentioned: 1267

Government
  - Mayor: Péter Pálinkás (Fidesz–KDNP)

Area
  - Total: 23.53 km^{2} (9.08 sq mi)

Population (2022)
  - Total: 5,352
  - Density: 227.5/km^{2} (589.1/sq mi)
- Time zone: UTC+1 (CET)
  - Summer (DST): UTC+2 (CEST)
- Postal code: 3021
- Area code: 37
- Website: www.lorinci.hu

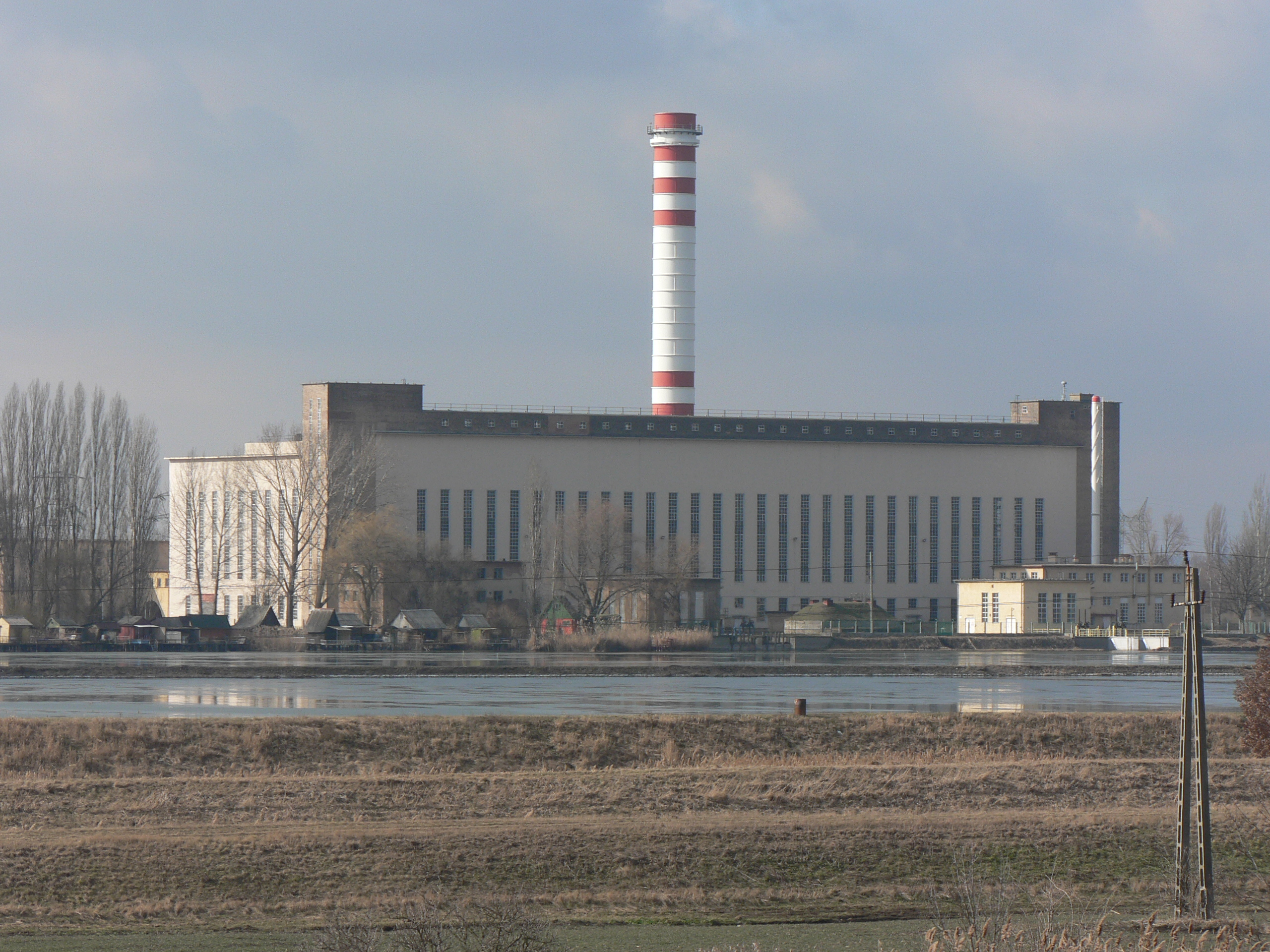
Thermal power station

Lőrinci is a town in Heves County, Hungary, beside of the Zagyva river. As of 2022 census, it has a population of 5352 (see Demographics). The town is located beside the (Nr. 81) Hatvan–Fiľakovo railway line and the main road 21. The M3 motorway is 7.4 km away. The town has a railway stop and a station: Selyp in the north, Lőrinci in the middle. The Mátravidéki Erőmű station in the south does not have public transport.

== History ==
Artifacts from the Bronze Age were found in the settlement. Its church is first mentioned in a charter in 1267 in the form of Ecclesia de Laurencio. The name of the settlement derives from the personal name Lőrinc (Laurence). The northern part of today's town was an independent village called Selyp, which belonged to the Rátót, then the Ákos clan, while Lőrinci belonged to the bishop of Oradea. It was occupied by the Ottomans in 1544 and Selyp was depopulated. In the 17th century, it became the property of the Royal Chamber, and its church was built in 1695. Count Antal Grassalkovich became the landlord in 1730. The population was engaged in transporting salt, a treasury salt office and a salt distributor operated in the settlement. In the 19th century, the population exceeded 1000, and Selyp was then annexed to Lőrinci. A cholera epidemic devastated the settlement in 1873. Baron Rezső Schossberger began the industrialization of Lőrinci: a sugar factory, a mill and a cement factory were built. The family also built a castle in 1924. The Mátravidék Power Plant was built in 1940, and then the lignite mine was opened. After 1945, a brick factory, a ceramic and tile factory and a cheese factory were established. A fishing lake was created next to the power plant. The mining settlement next to the lignite mine (Petőfibánya) became an independent village in 1989. The settlement received town status in 1992. The sugar factory closed in 1998. The Schossberger castle, which was damaged in the Second World War, was renovated in 2004 and the town library moved into it. The painter György Kepes (1906–2001) birth here.

== Demographics ==
According the 2022 census, 86.6% of the population were of Hungarian ethnicity, 1.5% were Gypsies and 13.0% were did not wish to answer. The religious distribution was as follows: 32.0% Roman Catholic, 2.7% Calvinist, 0.6% Lutheran, 0.5% Greek Catholic 16.7% non-denominational, and 44.7% did not wish to answer. The Gypsies have a local nationality government. 5294 people live in the town and 6 in an industrial establishment.

Population by years:

Year	1870	1880	1890	1900	1910	1920	1930	1941
Population	1934	1704	2666	3203	4075	4503	4881	4845
Year	1949	1960	1970	1980	1990	2001	2011	2022
Population	5308	7222	6917	6706	6149	6212	5843	5352

== Politics ==
Mayors since 1990:

- 1990–2002: Antal Varga (independent)
- 2002–2024: Zoltán Víg (until 2014: LVJBE, between 2006-2010 supported by the MSZP too, but from 2014 independent)
- 2024–: Péter Pálinkás (Fidesz–KDNP)
