= Bátonyterenye =

- Town
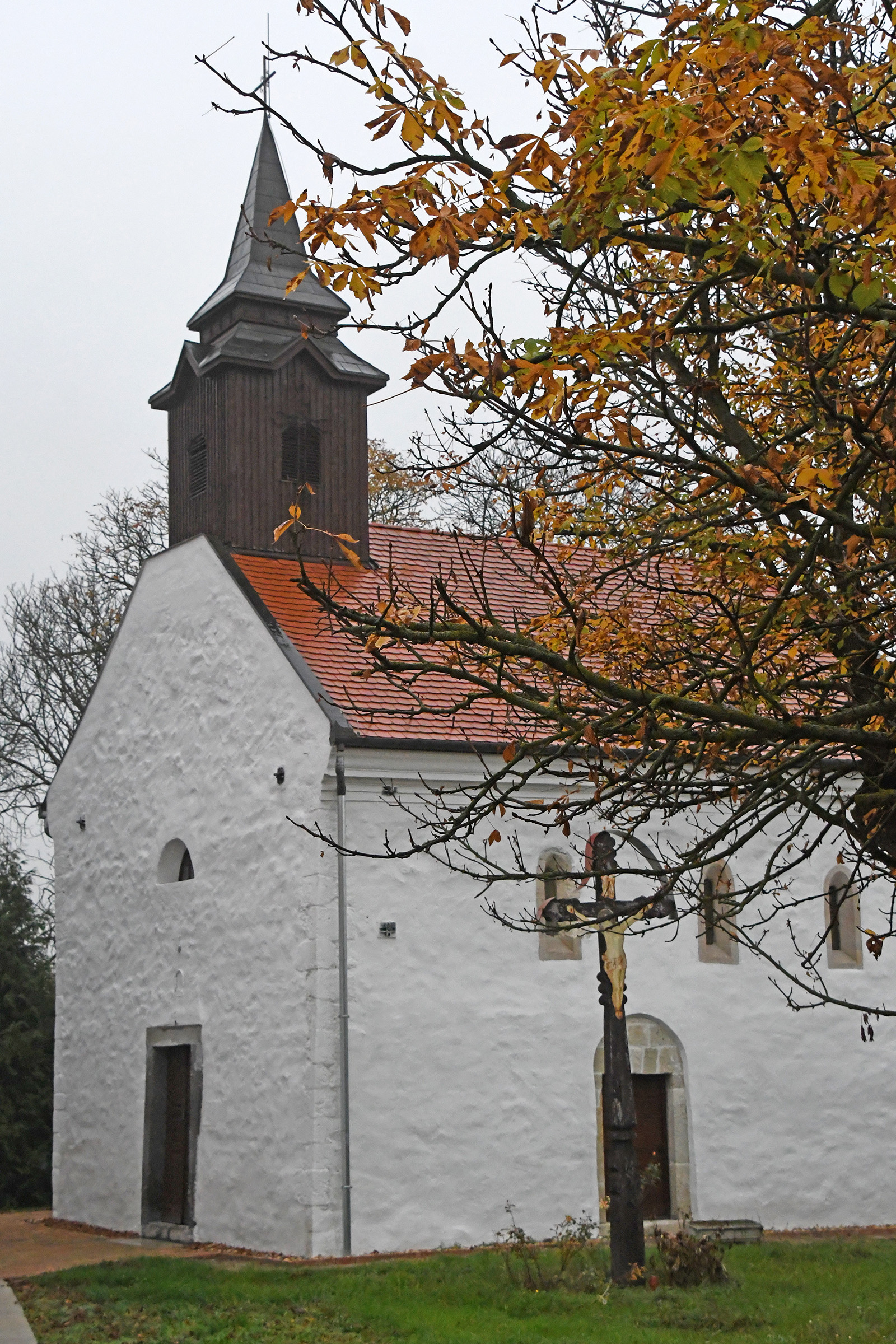
- King Saint Stepen church

- Flag Coat of arms

- Location in Hungary
- Coordinates: 47°59′21″N 19°49′43″E
- Country: Hungary
- County: Nógrád
- District: Bátonyterenye
- Unification: 1984

Government
  - Mayor: István Orosz (Mátravölgye SC)

Area
  - Total: 78.92 km^{2} (30.47 sq mi)

Population (2022)
  - Total: 11,296
  - Density: 143.1/km^{2} (370.7/sq mi)
- Time zone: UTC+1 (CET)
  - Summer (DST): UTC+2 (CEST)
- Postal code: 3070, 3078
- Area code: 32
- Website: www.batonyterenye.hu

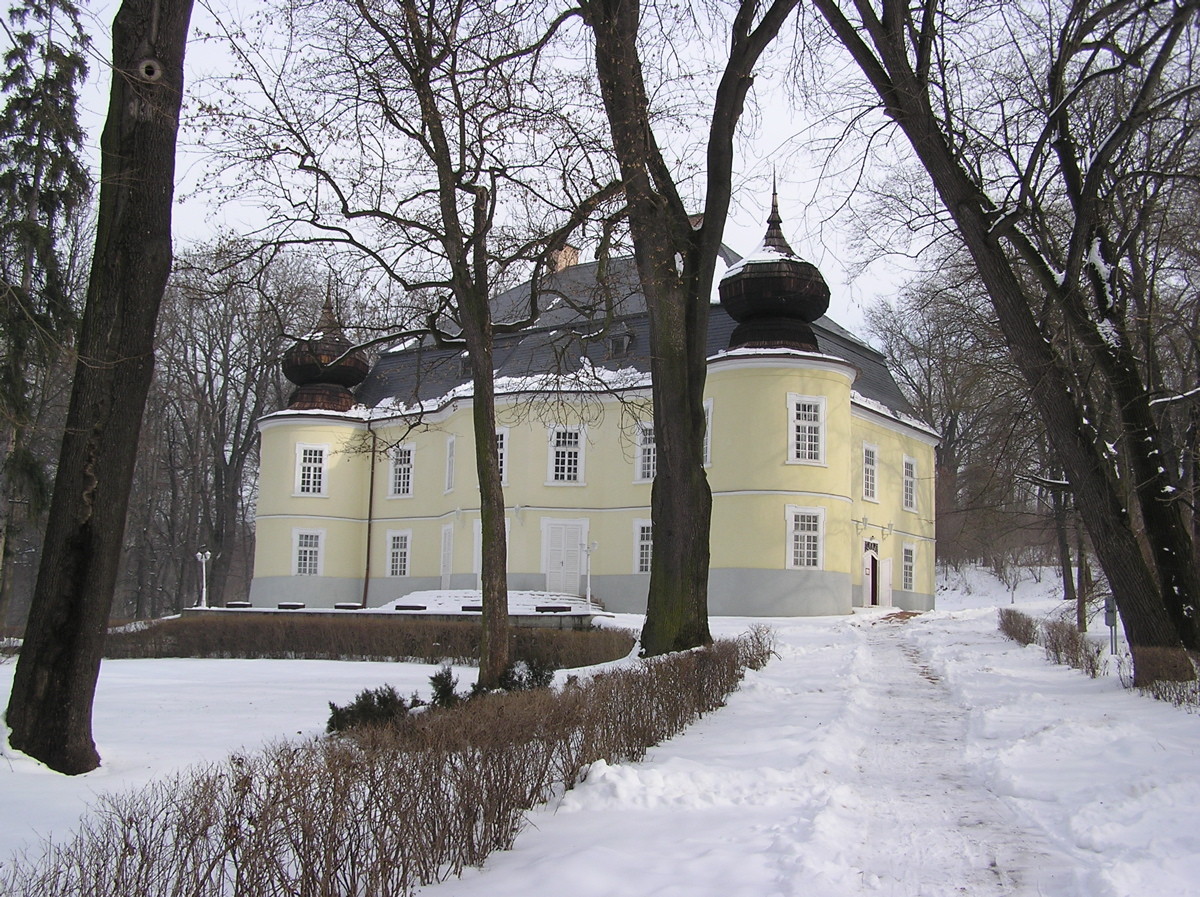
Gyürky-Solymossy Castle

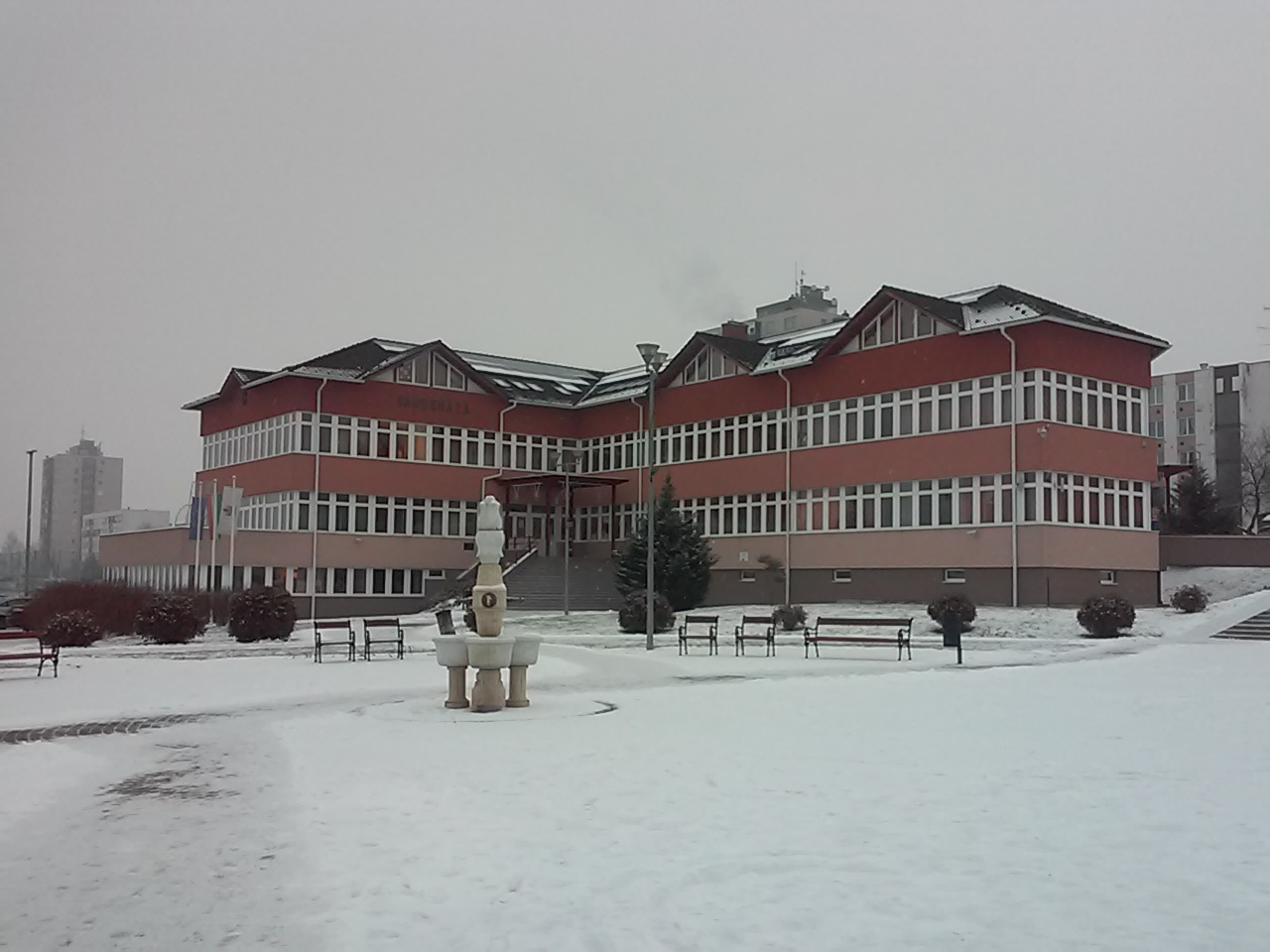
City hall of Bátonyterenye

Bátonyterenye is a town in Nógrád County, Hungary, under the Mátra mountain range, beside the Zagyva river. As of 2022 census, it has a population of 11,296 (see Demographics). The town is located beside the (Nr. 81) Hatvan–Fiľakovo railway line and the main road 21. The M3 motorway is 42.6 km away. The city has two railway stations: Kisterenye in the north and Nagybátony in the south.

== History ==
The area of Bátonyterenye was populated early, it was a densely populated place in the second half of the Bronze Age, around 1500 BC. The first documented mention of the settlement dates from 1216, when the southern part of the present-day town (Nagybátony) is mentioned as Batun. The northern town (Kisterenye) is first mentioned in 1280 as Thyrina, then in 1381 as Egihazas and in 1413 as Vásáros Therennye. The east-central district (Maconka) is mentioned in 1396 under the name Machunka. In Maconka and Kisterenye built a Romanesque style church. Kisterenye was given the status of a market town in the 15th century. Szúpatak, west of the city, was mentioned for the first time in 1461 under the name Azzywpatak. The villages was burned several times by the Ottomans in the 16th century. Szúpatak and then Kisterenye were also depopulated. Slovak settlers appeared in Szúpatak around 1740 and they built up the Lutheran church of the village. In Nagybátony, the Saint George church was built in 1735 and after 1839, the medieval church of Saint Stephen in Kisterenye was expanded twice. In the 18-19. century the Almásy and Gyürky families owned the villages. The Gyürky family built the onion-domed Gyürky-Solymosy castle, which has a 13-hectare park. The Almásy's farm buildings of the 19th century remain on the Felsőlengyend farm. In the Middle Ages, the population of the villages lived from agriculture, and the land was the common property of the local nobility.
The Hatvan-Fülek railway line was built in 1867, which ensured the possibility of coal extraction. Coal mining began in the 1860s northeast of Kisterenye and south of Nagybátony. As a result of mining, mining communities were established in the valleys of the Szoros, Kecskés and Kazár creeks. The jobs that appeared as a result of coal mining increased immigration from the surrounding settlements and from the direction of the Great Hungarian Plain. In Kisterenye in 1907 built up the Lutheran church. Until 1950, the Zagyva river marked the county border between Heves and Nógrád counties, which meant that Nagybátony and Maconka belonged to Heves county. The construction of the Bányaváros district connecting Maconka and Nagybátony began in 1950. Half of the population lived from te mining, and the settlement's secondary school was built in the 1950s. From the 1960s, the settlements expanded towards each other.
In 1984, Kisterenye, Maconka, Nagybátony and Szúpatak were officially united and Bátonyterenye was created. The settlement received town status in 1989. Bátonyterenye was created as a typical socialist mining town, so it was sensitively affected by the closure of the mines. The establishment of the hosiery factory, heating equipment factory and iron alloy factory only alleviated unemployment in the short term. At the beginning of the 21st century, an industrial park was created between the railway and the main road. After the collectivization, the Mátra Cooperative became the dominant force in agriculture, which still operates today. The northern and southern ends of the city are garden-like. The population of Szúpatak has drastically decreased due to its geographical isolation. Rákóczibánya in the northeast became an independent village in 2002. The town is the part of the Novohrad-Nógrád Geopark with the Gyürky-Solymosy castle and with the water storage of Maconka.

== Demographics ==
According the 2022 census, 86.7% of the population were of Hungarian ethnicity, 4.9% were Gypsies and 13.2% were did not wish to answer. The religious distribution was as follows: 30.3% Roman Catholic, 1.9% Lutheran, 1.4% Calvinist, 22.2% non-denominational, and 41.3% did not wish to answer. The Gypsies have a local nationality government. Two other inner area exist 6.6 and 6.9 km far from the town center, outside of the city: Szúpatak and Szorospatak with 52 and 32 people. Another 49 people are living in 8 farms. Szúpatak and the surrounding farms have and own postal code (3078).

Population by years:

Year	1870	1880	1890	1900	1910	1920	1930	1941
Population	3869	4039	4290	4558	5094	6142	7637	8366
Year	1949	1960	1970	1980	1990	2001	2011	2022
Population	8854	13,745	14,244	14,474	15,025	14,502	13,169	11,296

== Politics ==
Mayors since 1990:

- 1990–1994: Mihály Nagy (independent)
- 1994–2002: Ottó Balázs (MSZP)
- 2002–2007: Gábor Vanya (MSZP, until 2006 supported by the MP and the MSZDP too)
- 2007–2010: Éva Dóka, Mrs. Lavaj (MSZP)
- 2010–2024: József Nagy-Majdon (Fidesz–KDNP)
- 2024–: István Orosz (Mátravölgye Sport Club)

== Notable people ==
- Lajos Abonyi (1833–1898) writer
- István Szabó, Sr. (1903–1992) sculptor, his many works in the town
- István Szabó, Jr. (1927–2017) sculptor, honorary citizen

== Twin towns – sister cities ==
Bátonyterenye is twinned with:

- Fiľakovo, Slovakia
- Giresun, Turkey
- Jirkov, Czech Republic
- Kobylnica, Poland

== Sport ==
Nagybátonyi SC - Association football club
