= Main road 21 (Hungary) =

Road in Hungary

Main road 21
- 21-es főút
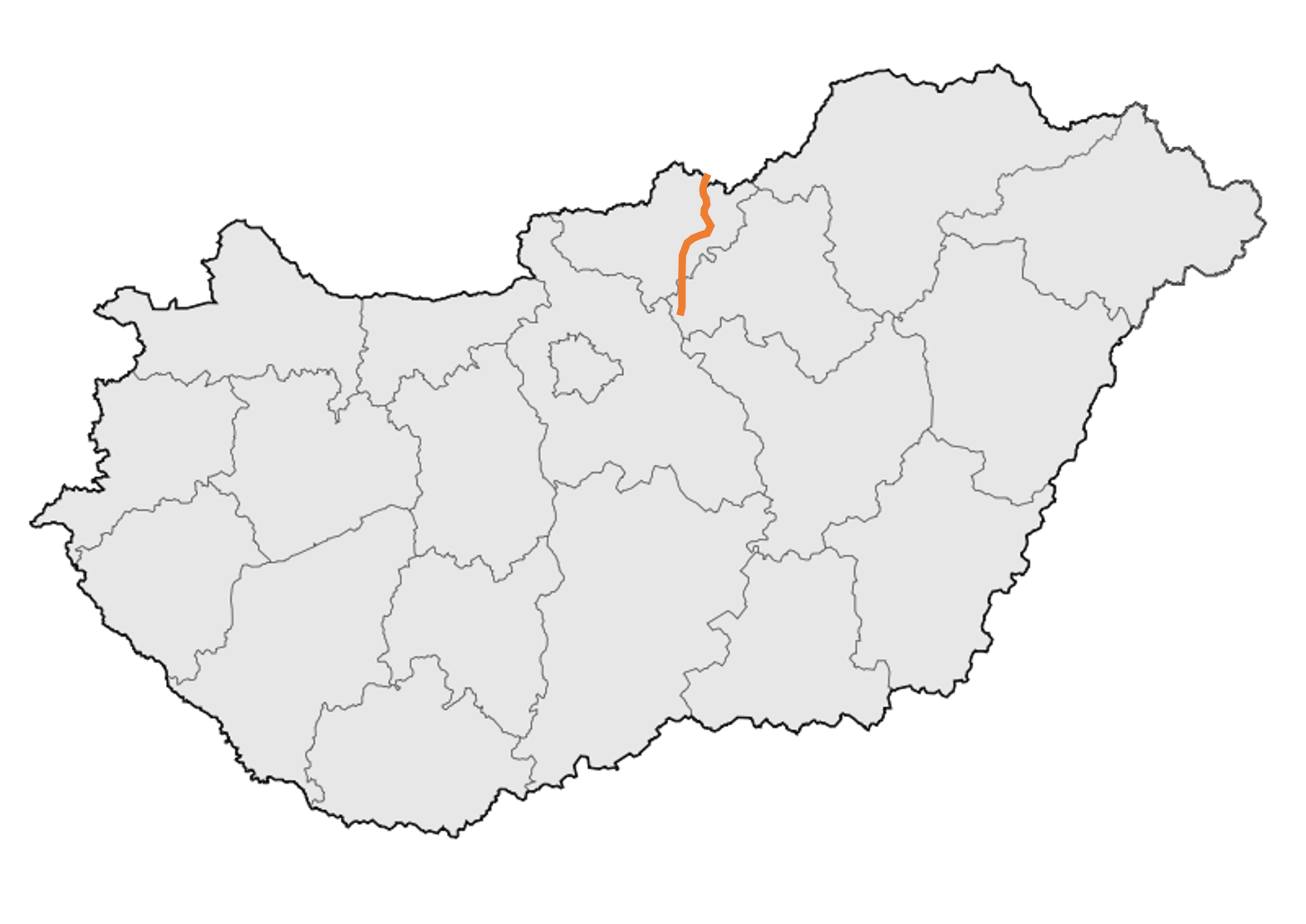

Route information
- Length: 65 km (40 mi)

Major junctions
- From: M3 near Hatvan
- 23 in Bátonyterenye; 22, 211 in Salgótarján
- To: Somoskőújfalu border with Slovakia I/79

Location
- Country: Hungary
- Counties: Heves, Nógrád
- Major cities: Hatvan, Lőrinci, Pásztó, Bátonyterenye, Salgótarján

Highway system
- Roads in Hungary; Highways; Main roads; Local roads

The Main road 21 is a south–north direction First class main road in the valley of the Zagyva river, that connects the Hungarian M3 motorway's Hatvan junction, facilitating access from the capital city of Hatvan to Salgótarján-Somoskőújfalu. The road is 65 km long.

The road, like all other main roads in Hungary, is managed and maintained by the state-owned company Magyar Közút.

== See also ==
- Roads in Hungary
- Transport in Hungary
