= Somoskőújfalu =

- Village (község)
- Coat of arms

- Location of Somoskőújfalu in Hungary
- Coordinates: 48°09′41″N 19°49′16″E
- Country: Hungary
- Region: Northern Hungary
- County: Nógrád County
- Subregion: Salgótarján

Government
  - Mayor: László Tóth (Ind.)

Area
  - Total: 2.33 km^{2} (0.90 sq mi)

Population (1 Jan. 2015)
  - Total: 2,227
  - Density: 956/km^{2} (2,480/sq mi)
- Time zone: UTC+1 (CET)
  - Summer (DST): UTC+2 (CEST)
- Postal code: 3121
- Area code: 32
- Website: http://somoskoujfalu.hu/

Somoskőújfalu (Slovak: Šomošská Nová Ves / Šomošová) is a village in Nógrád County, Northern Hungary Region, Hungary.
