= Battle of Hatvan =

Coordinates: 47°40′21.6″N 19°40′58.0″E

- Part of the Hungarian Revolution of 1848
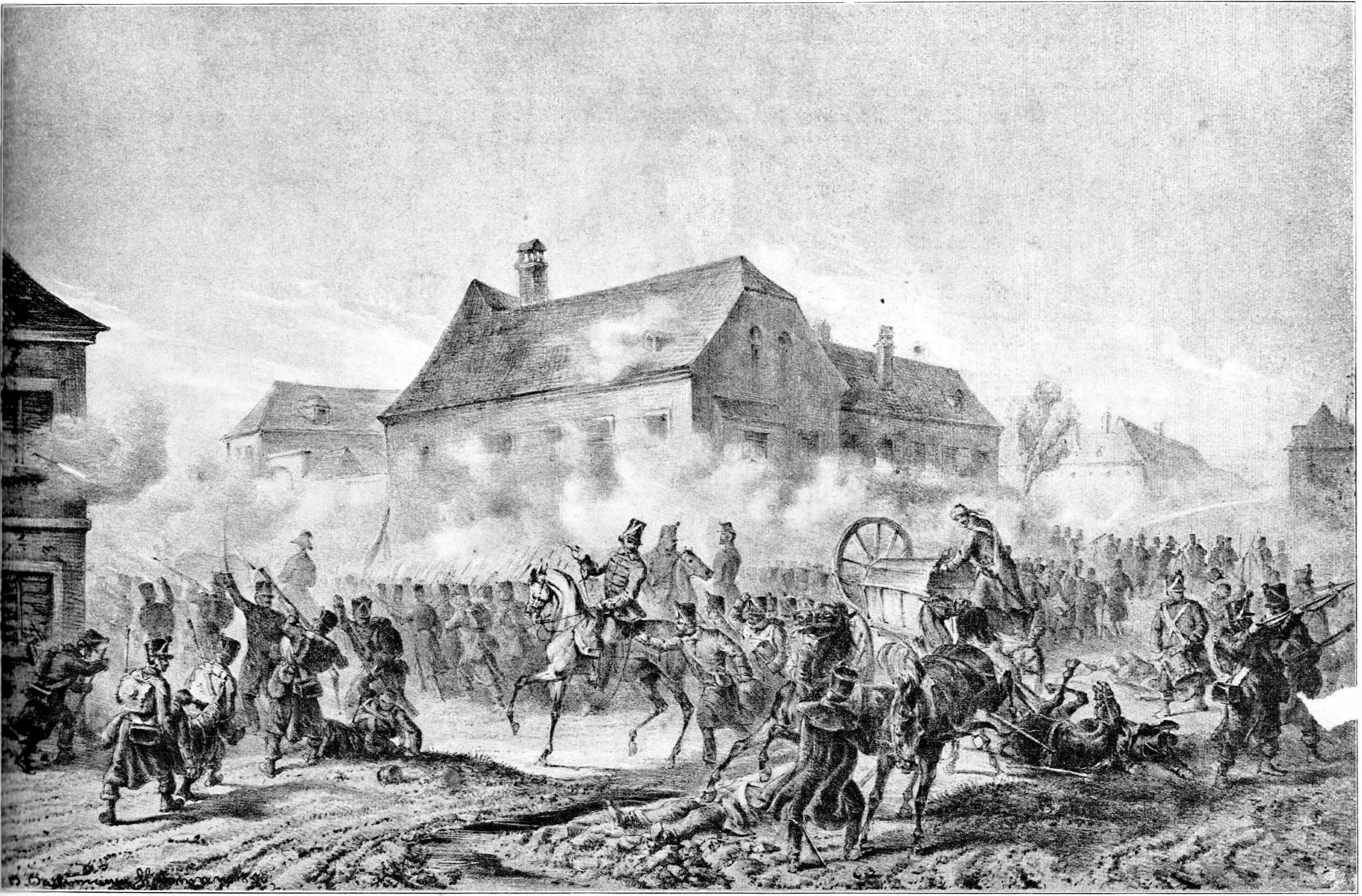
- The Battle of Hatvan
Date	2 April 1849
Location	around and in Hatvan, Kingdom of Hungary
Result	Hungarian victory

Belligerents
Hungarian Revolutionary Army; Polish Legion	Austrian Empire

Commanders and leaders
András Gáspár; Ernő Poeltenberg; Józef Wysocki	Franz Schlik

Strength
Total: 14,563 -VII. corps: 8,622 -Detached units of the III. corps: 5,941; 56 cannons	Total: 11,000; 40 cannons

Casualties and losses
20 killed or wounded	Total: 202 -48 dead -49 wounded -85 missing and prisoner

The Battle of Hatvan was the first battle in the Spring Campaign of the Hungarian War of Independence of 1848–1849, fought on 2 April 1849 between the Habsburg Empire and the Hungarian Revolutionary Army. This battle was the start of the Hungarian offensive whose aim was to liberate central and western Hungary, and its capital, from imperial occupation. The Austrian force was commanded by General Franz Schlik, while the Hungarians were led by Colonel András Gáspár, and lieutenant-colonel Ernő Poeltenberg. The Polish Legion under Colonel Józef Wysocki also fought alongside the Hungarians. The Hungarians were victorious, and advanced towards the Hungarian capitals, Buda and Pest.

== Background ==
=== The military situation around the Tisza in March 1849 ===
After the Battle of Kápolna on 26–27 February 1849, the commander of the Austrian imperial forces Alfred I, Prince of Windisch-Grätz thought that he had destroyed the Hungarian revolutionary forces once and for all. In his report of 3 March sent to the imperial court in Olmütz, he wrote that: I smashed the rebel hordes, and in a few days I will be in Debrecen (the temporary capital of Hungary). Despite this he did not attack the Hungarian forces, because he did not have any reliable information about the strength of the Hungarian troops he would face if he crossed the Tisza river. But because of his caution, he lost the opportunity to win the war. While he was debating whether or not to attack, the Hungarian commanders who were discontented with the disappointing performance of Lieutenant General Henryk Dembiński as commander-in-chief of the Hungarian forces, blaming him for the defeat at Kápolna, started a "rebellion", holding a meeting in Tiszafüred, which forced the Government Commissioner Bertalan Szemere to depose the Polish general and install Artúr Görgei instead. This infuriated Lajos Kossuth, the President of the National Defense Committee (interim government of Hungary), who wanted to execute Görgei for rebellion. Finally, the Hungarian generals’ support for Görgei forced him to renounce his plan and accept the deposition of Dembiński. But Kossuth's antipathy towards Görgei prevented him from accepting Szemere's decision, and he named Lieutenant General Antal Vetter, the deputy minister of war, as commander-in-chief instead.

Vetter was a capable general, and, unlike the defensive-minded Dembiński, wanted to chase with an offensive the Austrian troops from western Hungary. On 16–17 March he crossed the Tisza on the bridge from Cibakháza with the I., II., and III. corps (around 28,000 soldiers), planning to push the enemy troops from the Budapest-Szolnok railroad, by advancing towards Nagykőrös. Meanwhile, Görgei with the VII. corps had to cross the Tisza at Tokaj, to advance on the Miskolc-Gyöngyös-Eger road, drawing the attention of the Austrian main forces on him. Görgei crossed the Tisza on 14 March, and headed on 15 towards Miskolc, entering the town on 16. On 18 March his divisions were at Füzesabony, Szihalom, and Mezőkövesd, and on 22 they occupied the line of the Tarna river, remaining there until 29–30 March. Meanwhile, without having any information about the Hungarian Hungarian plans and military actions, Windisch-Grätz finally decided to cross the Tisza, and attack the Hungarians. On 14 March he wrote to his generals, that with this attack he wants to gather information about the size of the enemy armies and their plans. On 18 March, at Vetter's camp around Kocsér, right when he planned to march towards Nagykőrös, he heard a rumor that a 40,000-strong Austrian army was in that city. Vetter called a council of war, proposing to march towards Abony, and attack the enemy left wing stationing there, but two of the generals, János Damjanich and Lajos Aulich, opposed this plan, saying that in the case of an unsuccess, the Hungarian army will be not able to retreat on the Tisza's left bank on the bridge from Cibakháza, and the only bridge nearby, which was at Szolnok, was burned in January by Dembiński. In this case, the Austrian army, which will be closer to the bridge from Cibakháza, locking Vetter's army on the right bank of the Tisza, will be able to cross it and attack Debrecen, left without defense. As a result of this, the council of war decided to retreat to the left bank of the Tisza at Cibakháza, which they did on 18–19 March.

Meanwhile, Windisch-Grätz was still undecided about what to do, although General Franz Schlik was informed by one of his officers that on the night of 17 March 20,000 Hungarian soldiers crossed the Tisza, heading to Kecskemét, and on 18 a merchant who came from Cibakháza, informed the Austrians that in the previous day, a huge Hungarian army crossed the river, headed towards Nagykőrös, then retreated behind the Tisza on the next day. Windisch-Grätz did not understand anything from this, but he decided to postpone his plan to cross the Tisza. On 20 March Windisch-Grätz was informed about Görgei's crossing at Tokaj, so he decided to redeploy his troops to the northeast. After changing his mind a couple of times about where to position his troops, on 22 March he deployed his troops as follows: the I corps led by Lieutenant Field Marshal Josip Jelačić to Cegléd, the Rastić brigade to Abony, the Csorich division to Hatvan, the Ramberg division to Vác. Schlik's III. corps had to station at Jászberény, to be able to support, if necessary, both the troops from Cegléd and also those from Hatvan. To prevent an eventual Hungarian attempt to relieve the besieged fortress of Komárom, Windisch-Grätz sent a smaller detachment under the leadership of Colonel Almásy and Colonel Zagitzek to Losonc.

Because of the failure of his first offensive, Vetter was forced to elaborate another campaign plan. He knew that he cannot cross again the Tisza at Cibakháza, and, because the Austrians had troops at Szolnok, he cannot use the bridge from there either, so the only viable points of crossing remained Tiszafüred and Tokaj. He sent Görgei towards Gyöngyös, while he planned to cross the Tisza with the other three corps at Tiszafüred, and march with them towards Eger, concentrating his troops between Eger and Gyöngyös, then advance towards Vác, defeating the Austrian troops from there. Then he planned to send Görgei's VII. and Aulich's II. corps on the left bank of the Danube to relieve Komárom from the north, then, in case of success, to cross the Danube, and to march on the right shore of it towards Buda. Meanwhile, the other two corps will march against Pest, and in this way, the two army groups will encircle the Austrian main army. But Vetter did not know that Windisch-Grätz's troops were marching also towards the north and this put his plan in jeopardy.

Vetter prepared to cross the Tisza at Tiszafüred in horrible weather, during heavy rains. He decided to reorganize his army, abolishing the two (Upper-Hungarian and Central-Hungarian) army groupings, dividing the army into four (I., II., VII.) corps, and a reserve division. As a result of this, General Damjanich lost his position as army commander, and because of this, he started a quarrel with Vetter, threatening him with execution in case of if he failed to be successful with this new grouping. Because of this quarrel, as well as the former unsuccesses in starting the campaign, Vetter got sick and became unable to lead the Hungarian army. Faced with this problem, and being reluctant to name Görgei in Vetter's place, Kossuth came up with the surprising idea to lead the Hungarian army himself, naming General Klapka as its chief of staff. But Klapka convinced him, that without having a military background, he cannot lead the army, and said that if Vetter will not recover until 30 March, Görgei must take over the command. This solution was supported also by Damjanich and Aulich. So finally, unwillingly, Kossuth had to accept this proposal, naming Görgei "during the period of Vetter's illness", the "provisional commander-in-chief" of the main Hungarian force.

These days and weeks of unrest, uncertainty, and changes in the leadership of the Hungarian army could have been an excellent opportunity for Windisch-Grätz to cross the Tisza river and defeat the Hungarians once and for all, but he did nothing. Having no information about the Hungarian army's size and purposes, he had no courage to risk an attack.

=== The start of the Spring Campaign ===
On 30–31 March the plan was devised for the Hungarian army's Spring Campaign. Under the overall command of the most capable Hungarian general, Artúr Görgei, the best generals were appointed to lead the corps preparing to attack the Austrians and liberate Hungarian lands west of the Tisza river (consisting of much of the territory of the Kingdom of Hungary, occupied by the Habsburg forces). Görgei's army numbered 47,500 men and 198 guns organized in 4 army corps led by General György Klapka (I. Corps), General Lajos Aulich (II. Corps), General János Damjanich (III. Corps) and Colonel András Gáspár (VII. Corps). The imperial forces under Alfred I, Prince of Windisch-Grätz had 55,000 men and 214 guns and rockets organized in 3 army corps led by Lieutenant Field Marshal Josip Jelačić (I. Corps), Lieutenant General Anton Csorich (II. Corps), General Franz Schlik (III. Corps), and one division under Lieutenant General Georg Heinrich Ramberg.

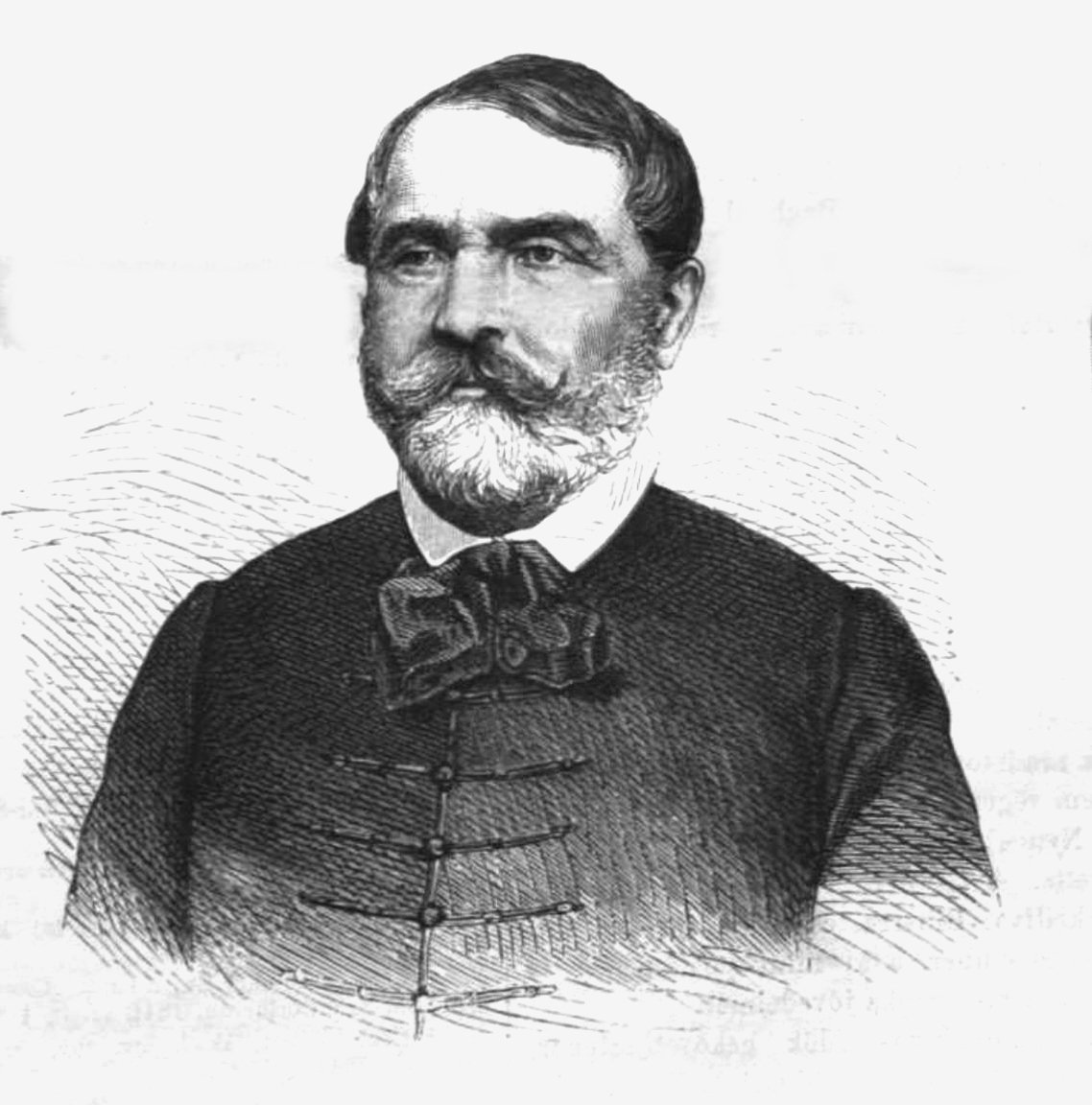
András Gáspár

Despite his troops' numerical superiority, Windisch-Grätz was paralyzed by increasing fear of a Hungarian attack, and because of this he tried to discover the numbers and strength of the Hungarian armies which were on the Eastern bank of the Tisza river, but his spies were unable to obtain any information. In the second half of March, the Hungarian successful attacks against the Austrian troops northwest to the Tisza river increased (most importantly the Hungarian raid on Losonc from 24 March 1849), and their attempts to start a massive counter-offensive intensified (the crossing of the Hungarian main army to the right bank of the Tisza between 26 and 29 March). Because of this Windisch-Grätz spread his troops out to prevent an outflanking attack from the north (mainly because of the reports overexaggerating the size of the Hungarian troops which attacked Losonc), which he feared that they would relieve the imperial siege of the fortress of Komárom, and could cut his lines of communication. Also the contradictory reports of the commanders of the Austrian troops he sent as outposts to the line of the Tisza, about the alleged crossings of Hungarian troops on the different bridges, augmented his uncertainty and indecision. Spreading his corps, divisions, and brigades across such a wide geographical distance, Windisch-Grätz handed the Hungarians the possibility of victory on a silver plate. On 23 March the commander of the I. corps, Lieutenant Field Marshal Josip Jelačić, informed Windisch-Grätz about the crossing of the Tisza of "important forces" at Cibakháza, that they planning a general attack against his positions, and because of this he asked for at least one of Schlik's III. corps divisions as reinforcement. Windisch-Grätz, who was not sure about the reality of this report, wrote to Schlik, to decide for himself to send, or not the required division to Jelačić. On 24 March Windisch-Grätz was informed that his 500-600 soldiers' strong detachment from Losonc was attacked by Hungarian forces, which captured half of them. The leader of the Austrian detachment, Colonel Károly Almásy wrote a very exaggerated report that the Hungarian troops were 5000-6000 strong (while in reality, they had about 400 soldiers), which alarmed Windisch-Grätz, making him fear that the Hungarians want to relieve Komárom. So, as a result of his new orders, on 26–27 March the Ramberg division occupied Balassagyarmat, the Csorich division took a position at Vác, the Lobkowitz division of the Schlik corps stood at Gödöllő, and his Liechtenstein division at Tápióbicske, while the I. corps of Jelačić remained until 1 April around Cegléd, and to supervise the safe keeping of the locomotives, wagons, salt-stock, and other kinds of value stocks from Szolnok, then on 2 April to march to Alberti.

After this, Windisch-Grätz received new contradictory reports, about more Hungarian troops in Upper Hungary, so he decided on 31 March to carry out a large-scale reconnaissance action to learn the real position of the Hungarian troops. So he ordered Schlik to conduct with his corps a reconnaissance in the direction of Bag-Hatvan-Gyöngyös, if he meets superior enemy forces, to retreat to Bag, if not, to not advance further as Gyöngyös. At the same time he ordered Csorich to deploy at Vác, and support, if necessary, Schlik by marching towards Gödöllő, or Ramberg, by marching towards Balassagyarmat. Jelačić had to remain at Cegléd At the same time, he decided to concentrate his troops nearer to Pest, on the Monor-Gödöllő-Vác-Vadkert line.

=== Hatvan and its surroundings in 1849 ===
Around the time of the battle, Hatvan was a market town of 2300 inhabitants, which most important buildings were the Catholic church, the provostry, the castle, the guest house, the postal office, and the salthouse. The town was bounded by the Zagyva river, across which a bridge was made on the western end of the town, being an important crossing point over the marshy banks of the river. A couple of roads led to the bridge: the most important being the Pest - Gödöllő - Gyöngyös - Eger, the other was the Jászfényszaru road which came from the south, another from Csány, and finally one from Jobbágyi. Besides of this, in the town there were also other smaller bridges across the small creeks. North from the town, at the Gombos waste, it was another bridge of lesser importance over the Zagyva. Northeast and East from Hatvan lay the so-called Strázsa hegy (Guard Hill), the side of which lay towards the town was abrupt, while its other sides were more gentle. Strázsa Hill was continued towards the south by a range of hills, on which lay the town fruit gardens and vineyards. The main road headed eastwards from Hatvan among these hills through a small pass.

East from Hatvan, to an hour's distance, lay the village Hort, which had around 1700 inhabitants. Hort laid on a lower point of a hilly area, next to the road. The region between Hort and Hatvan had many swampy creeks, but all of them had bridges over them.

== Prelude ==
The essence of the new operational plan elaborated on 30–31 April by General Klapka, adjusted by Lieutenant Colonel József Bayer, was to attract the attention of Windisch-Grätz on the VII. corps at Hatvan, while the other three corps try to get around the Austrian armies with a march, through the Jászság region, towards the southwest, and cut them from Budapest. According to the operational plan, the VII. corps had to remain at Hatvan until 5 April, then, on 6, to march to Bag. The other three corps (I., II., III.) had to reach Isaszeg on 6 April. The decisive attack had to be carried out from two directions, concentrically, against the enemy positions from Gödöllő on 7 April. In the case of a successful battle, the I. corps had to advance to Kerepes, to cut the enemy's retreat to Pest, enabling with this the liberation of the Hungarian capital. The plan was risky and needed very meticulous cooperation between the Hungarian corps because if Windisch-Grätz learned that only a corps was stationing at Hatvan, with a quick attack of superior units, he could easily crush the VII. corps, getting behind the Hungarian army and cutting them from their operational base. This is why a very great responsibility lay on Gáspár's shoulders to lead VII. Corps (General András Gáspár replaced General Artúr Görgei on the leadership of this corps because due to Vetter's disease, the latter became the temporary high commander) in a way that would not betray the campaign's strategy. This meant he had to make the enemy commander facing him believe he was confronted by the whole Hungarian army, distracting his attention from the Hungarian I., II., and III. Corps, which meanwhile were advancing towards Gödöllő from the southeast. If Gáspár had failed in this task, Windisch-Grätz could have sent overwhelming forces to destroy him, which would then have opened the way for the Austrians to the interim Hungarian capital, Debrecen.

On 1 April the III. and VII. corps of the Hungarian army were stationing at Gyöngyös, while the I. and the II. corps took positions at Karácsond, Sár and Detk. On this day Görgei gave the orders of march: the III. corps had to advance to Jászárokszállás, but dispatch a strong detachment to Csány, the I. corps had to move to Jászárokszállás and Miske, the II. corps to Adács and Vámosgyörk, while the reserve division led by Lieutenant Colonel János Máriássy (this division was soon dissolved and its units were distributed between the I. and the II. corps) also to Jászárokszállás. Meanwhile, the VII. corps led by Colonel András Gáspár remained east to the Zagyva river. One of his divisions, which was led by Lieutenant-Colonel Ernő Poeltenberg was in Hort, with only a minor unit stationed in Hatvan. Schlik's imperial III. Corps came from the west, entered the town, and chased out the Hungarians towards Hort, killing two Hussars. Schlik was sent by Marshal Windisch-Grätz to conduct a reconnaissance in force to discover the strength and positions of the Hungarian forces in that area. Hearing this, Görgei sent Colonel András Gáspár there with a division, ordering him to defend Hort at any cost. On the next day the whole VII. corps and the III. corps Wysocki division was engaged in the Battle of Hatvan against Schlik's III. corps. The two armies were composed of the following units.

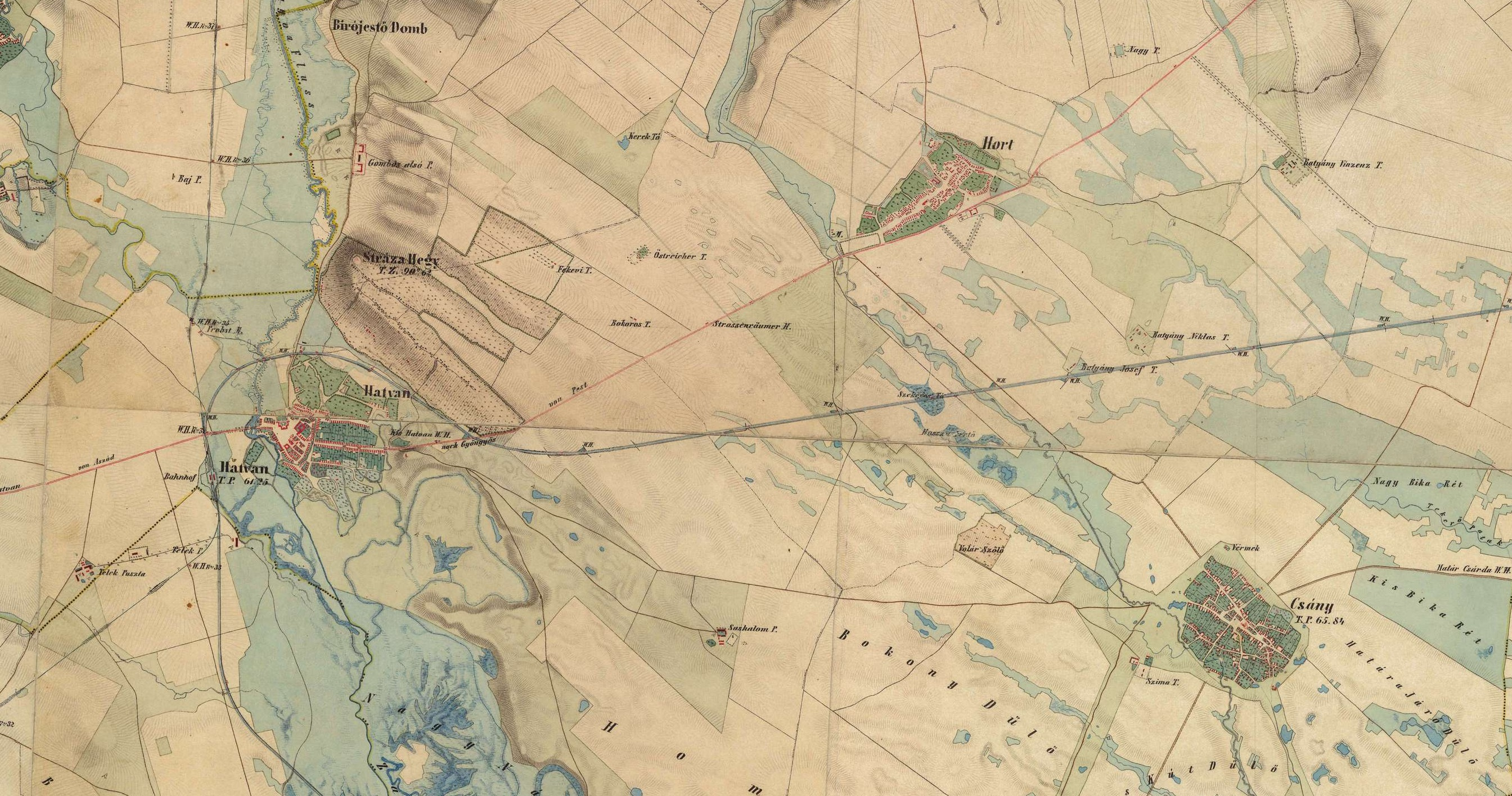
The location of the Battle of Hatvan (2 April 1849) on the Second Military Survey of Austro-Hungary (1806–1869)

The Hungarian army:

- VII. corps:

1. (Gáspár) division:

- 1. (Horváth) brigade: 39. infantry battalion, 6 companies of the 9. (Nicholas) hussar regiment, 2. six pounder cavalry battery;
- 2. (Waldberg) brigade: 1. battalion of the 60. (Wasa) infantry regiment, 4. six pounder infantry battery;
- 3. (Petheő) brigade: Nógrád battalion, 2 companies of the Újház jägers, 2 sapper companies, the Pozsony six pounder battery;

2. (Kmety) division:

- 4. (Gergely) brigade: 10. infantry battalion, 23. infantry battalion, 1 sapper company, 3. six pounder infantry battery;
- 5. (Újváry) brigade: 45. infantry battalion, 2 companies of jägers, 4 companies of the 9. (Wilhelm) hussar regiment, 4. six pounder cavalry battery;
- 6. (Üchritz) brigade: 33. infantry battalion, 2. infantry battalion from Besztercebánya, 2 companies of the 12. (Nádor) hussar regiment, 5. six pounder cavalry battery;

3. (Poeltenberg) division:

- 7. (Kossuth) brigade: 1. infantry battalion, 1. infantry battalion from Besztercebánya, 2 companies of the 4. (Alexander) hussar regiment, 5. six pounder infantry battery;
- 8. (Zámbelly) brigade: 14. infantry battalion, 1. infantry battalion from Pest, 4 companies of the 4. (Alexander) hussar regiment, 1. six pounder cavalry battery;

4. (Simon) division:

- 9. (Weissl) brigade: 4 companies of grenadiers, 2. battalion of the 48. (Ernest) infantry regiment, 1 company of German Legion, 1 howitzer battery;
- 10. (Liptay) brigade: 4 companies of the Tyrolian jägers, 1 sapper company, 1 howitzer cavalry battery, 2 Congreve rockets launching racks;

- III. corps (the units which got involved in the battle):

Wysocki division:

- 2. (Leiningen) brigade: 3. battalion of the 19. (Schwarzenberg) infantry regiment, 3. infantry battalion, 9. infantry battalion, 6 companies of the 3. (Ferdinand) hussar regiment, 4 companies of the 2. (Hannover) hussar regiment, 2. twelve-pounder infantry battery, 3. six-pounder cavalry battery;
- 3. (Czillich) brigade: 42. infantry battalion, Polish Legion, 3. battalion of the 60. (Wasa) infantry regiment, 4 companies of the 2. (Hannover) hussar regiment, 3. six pounder infantry battery;

The Austrian army:

- III. corps:

Lobkowitz division:

- Parrot brigade: 3. battalion of the 3. (Archduke Karl) infantry regiment, 1. battalion of the 12. (Wilhelm) infantry regiment, 1. battalion of the 24. (Parma) Landwehr regiment, 3. battalion of the 30. (Nugent) infantry regiment, 2 companies of the 2. jäger battalion, 1 company of the 1. (Imperial) chevau-léger regiment, 36. six pounder infantry battery;
- Künigl brigade: 3. battalion of the 12. (Wilhelm) infantry regiment, 3. battalion of the 40. (Koudelka) infantry regiment, 2. battalion of the 28. (Latour) infantry regiment, 2 companies of the 1. (Imperial) chevau-léger regiment, 34. six pounder infantry battery;

Liechtenstein division:

- Fiedler brigade: 3. battalion of the 58. (Archduke Stefan) infantry regiment, 2. battalion of the 9. (Hartmann) infantry regiment, 3. battalion of the 10. (Mazzuchelli) infantry regiment, 4 companies of the miscellaneous Ecker battalion;
- Montenuovo cavalry brigade: 2 companies of the 1. (Imperial) chevau-léger regiment, 2 companies of the 7. (Kress) chevau-léger regiment, 6 companies of the 10. (King of Prussia) cuirassier regiment, 2 companies of the 2. (Sunstenau) cuirassier regiment, 2. cavalry battery;
- The artillery reserve of the corps:

Schlik six-pounder infantry battery, 11. Congreve rockets battery, 12. Congreve rockets half battery.

On the day before the battle the positions of the Hungarian VII. corps was as it follows. The vanguard represented by the Poeltenberg brigade was at Hort, sending patrols and outposts towards Hatvan. The bulk of the corps was stationing in Gyöngyös and the villages around it. The corps had multiple duties. First of all, they had to gather information about the enemy, which according to the intelligence reports, were aligned behind the Galga river, building trenches to stop an eventual Hungarian attack. The second duty of the VII. corps was to be possible to conduct operations on its own for several days, without the help of the other Hungarian units, and if necessary, to stop any enemy attacks, even if they were made by superior forces. For this reason, the occupation of the Eastern banks of the Zagyva river, which could represent a good defensive line, was vitally important. Arriving at Hort, Lieutenant colonel Ernő Poeltenberg sent the Zámbelly brigade to occupy Hatvan. The brigade accomplished this task, its infantry occupying the town, while its cavalry, after crossing the Zagyva, made reconnaissance actions in small units. These hussar units met the vanguards of the Austrian III. corps, which were advancing towards Hatvan, already in the morning of 1. April. The hussars retreated behind the Zagyva without engaging in a fight with the Austrians, thus failing to acquire important information about their numbers and exact purpose. As a result of this, Major Lajos Zámbelly did not want to risk a confrontation with the Austrians, so he retreated from Hatvan towards Hort after destroying the bridge over the Zagyva.

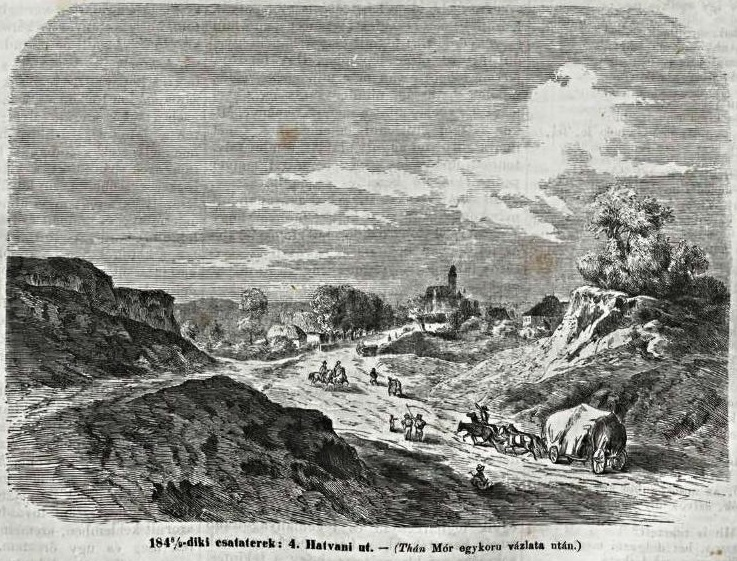
Hatvan in 1867

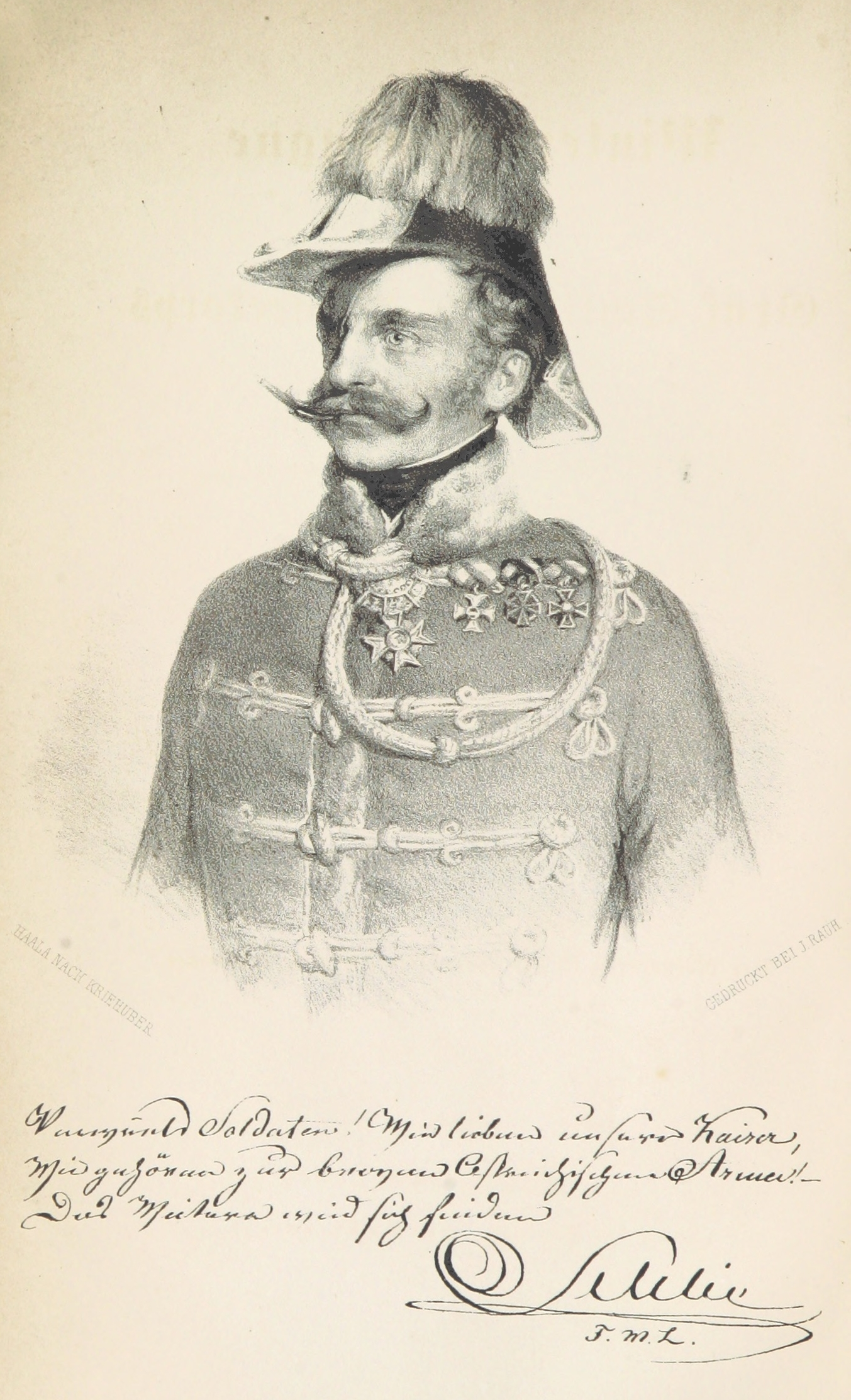
General Franz Schlik zu Bassano und Weißkirchen

Hearing about the Austrian advance, Poeltenberg ordered his division to advance to Hatvan to occupy it before the Austrians, but the sappers of the Parrot brigade restored the Zagyva bridge rapidly and occupied Hatvan before Poeltenberg's troops arrived there. Seeing this, Poeltenberg gave the order to retreat to Hort, while the cavalry and a cavalry brigade of his division prevented the Austrian cavalry to pursue the retreating Hungarians. Major General Jakob Parrot sent a Congreve rocket battery on the vineyards from the hills in front of Hatvan, to shoot the retreating Hungarians and the covering battery. The Hungarian battery responded by retreating behind the range of the rockets and with repeated changing of its positions, stopped the Austrian advance towards the rear of the Poeltenberg division. But when the Austrian cannons arrived, and they were too involved in the skirmish, they managed to kill a hussar and wound another two. But the Austrian jägers and the platoon sent on the left wing, as well as the cavalry, could not advance enough to harm the retreating Poeltenberg division, due to the effective actions of the hussars and the Hungarian batteries. Finally, because of the nightfall, all the Austrian actions halted, and the Hungarians arrived back at Hort. Here Poeltenberg ordered his troops to rest in the camp installed east from Hort, behind a creek but advised them to be ready of an eventual Austrian night attack. This is the reason also for the fact that he organized the camp in two lines: in the first the infantry, while in the second the cavalry, while the 1. infantry battalion encircled Hort with a chain of outposts.

On the evening of 1 April the vanguard of the III. corps of Schlik was in Hatvan, while the bulk stationed around Aszód and Bag. The Austrian general planned for the next day to unite his troops in Hatvan, and send his vanguard to occupy Hort. From the skirmishes on 1 April, he could not take important conclusions about the size of the Hungarian army, so he decided to continue his military reconnaissance. The fact that his patrols sent to Jászberény did not find any enemy troops. The Parrot brigade besides the Congreve rocket battery, received earlier, was reinforced with the 3. battalion of the Mazzuchelli infantry regiment. To secure his position and to learn more about the enemy positions, Parrot sent his cavalry patrols forward on the main road, and installed his infantry outposts in a long chain on the vine-growing hill, doubling their number for the night.

The skirmish from 1 April did not alter the campaign plans of the Hungarian army, but the commanders understood that the advanced division of Poeltenberg must be reinforced. Before 1 April the initial plan was that the Poeltenberg division remained in Hort, and take possession of Hatvan only with its cavalry. The Gáspár division had to take the southern portion of Gyöngyös, as well as the villages of Tas and Gyöngyöshalász. The Kmety division had also to remain in the southern part of Gyöngyös, and in Gyöngyöspata. The so-called Weissl column and the corps headquarters remained at Gyöngyös, preparing for the preparation of the marches. Thus these two units will not participate in the battle from the next day. At the same time the fact that a strong detachment of the III. (Damjanich) corps was sent to Csány, supporting in this way the VII. corps, was a good sign of anticipation.

After the Austrian attack against the Poeltenberg division from 1 April the dispositions regarding the duties of the VII. corps changed. The Gáspár division was sent forward to Hort, to form the reserve of the Poeltenberg division, while the Horváth and Liptay brigades, which were also part of the Gáspár division, were sent to Ecséd to support the right wing of the troops from Hort. The headquarters of the corps and the Weissl column were moved to Csány, where they had to wait for the detachment sent from the III. corps of János Damjanich arrived there, then to march to Hort after the Poeltengerg and Gáspár divisions. Görgei required the two divisions to repulse any enemy attack in the region between Hort and Hatvan. He did not give an order to attack, because he was not sure about the Austrian troops' strength, and he was informed that in Apc, Jobbágyi and Csécse were stationing 5000-6000 soldiers strong enemy detachments. Also according to the overall campaign plan the VII. corps job was not offensive, but to attract Windisch-Grätz's attention to them, enabling the other corps to encircle the Austrian troops. So an attack against the Austrians was not among their duties.

== Battle ==
On 2 April General Schlik gave the order to depart for his troops from Aszód and Bag around 9:30 a.m. towards Hatvan, while the Parrot brigade from the Liechtenstein division, already in the town, had to start its deployment at 11:00 a.m. The vanguard brigade took the position, covered by jägers, on the heights of the vine-growing hills, perpendicularly to the main road. Right from the road took firing position the 6-pounder infantry battalion, defended by a company of the Imperial chevau-légers. Left from the road, the brigade's Congreve rocket battery took the position, with a company from the Wilhelm infantry battalion, as protection against an eventual attack. The center of the Parrot brigades battle order was occupied by the rest of the Wilhelm infantry battalion, organized in a tight column, behind an earthwork. The right wing of the first line was represented by the Nugent battalion, while its left flank by the Mazzuchelli battalion. In the second line stood two battalions: one battalion of the Karl infantry regiment, the other from the Parma infantry regiment.

Schlik arrived in Hatvan around 1:00 p.m., after the battle between the Parrot brigade and the Hungarians already started. The Austrian commander aligned his troops on the ridge of the vine-growing hills, on the right and left of the already deployed Parrot brigade. Left from the Parrot brigade, under the leadership of Lieutenant General Liechtenstein, the Fiedler brigade took the position, reinforced by a half battery and some cavalry, on the ridge of the Strázsa hill. Its left wing was covered by a chain of cavalrymen sent in support by Schlik, who did not expect an important Hungarian attack from this direction. The Austrians here had the most favorable natural defensive positions because the mountain here had steep slopes, and on the other hand the strait between the Zagyva river and the Strázsa hill could be easily closed and defended. Because of this Schlik weakened the Fiedler brigade by sending the Mazzuchelli battalion in support of the Parrot brigade, as well as a company from the Ecker battalion to defend the Zagyva-bridge. On the right wing the geographic situation was much more unfavorable for the Austrians. The terrain southeast of the town was flat, and a row of hills obstructed the eyesight of the Austrians. Schlik commanded this flank. He put on the right flank a battery, under the cover of a forest, guarded by 2 companies of chevau-légers. The bulk of this wing was represented by the infantry of the Künigl brigade. Schlik also ordered the Montenuovo cavalry brigade to support the attack. The reserve of the Schlik corps was represented by the units of the Montenuovo cavalry brigade, which were not already sent as reinforcements for the brigades from the front, a cannon battery, and a half Congreve rocket battery.

Schlik's plan was, through the Parrot's brigade's advance, to force the Hungarians in front of Hort to reveal their strength. According to some accounts, Schlik was in a light-hearted mood and told his officers that the battle would be a joyous rabbit hunt. He did not imagine that in the end, his troops would become the hunted.

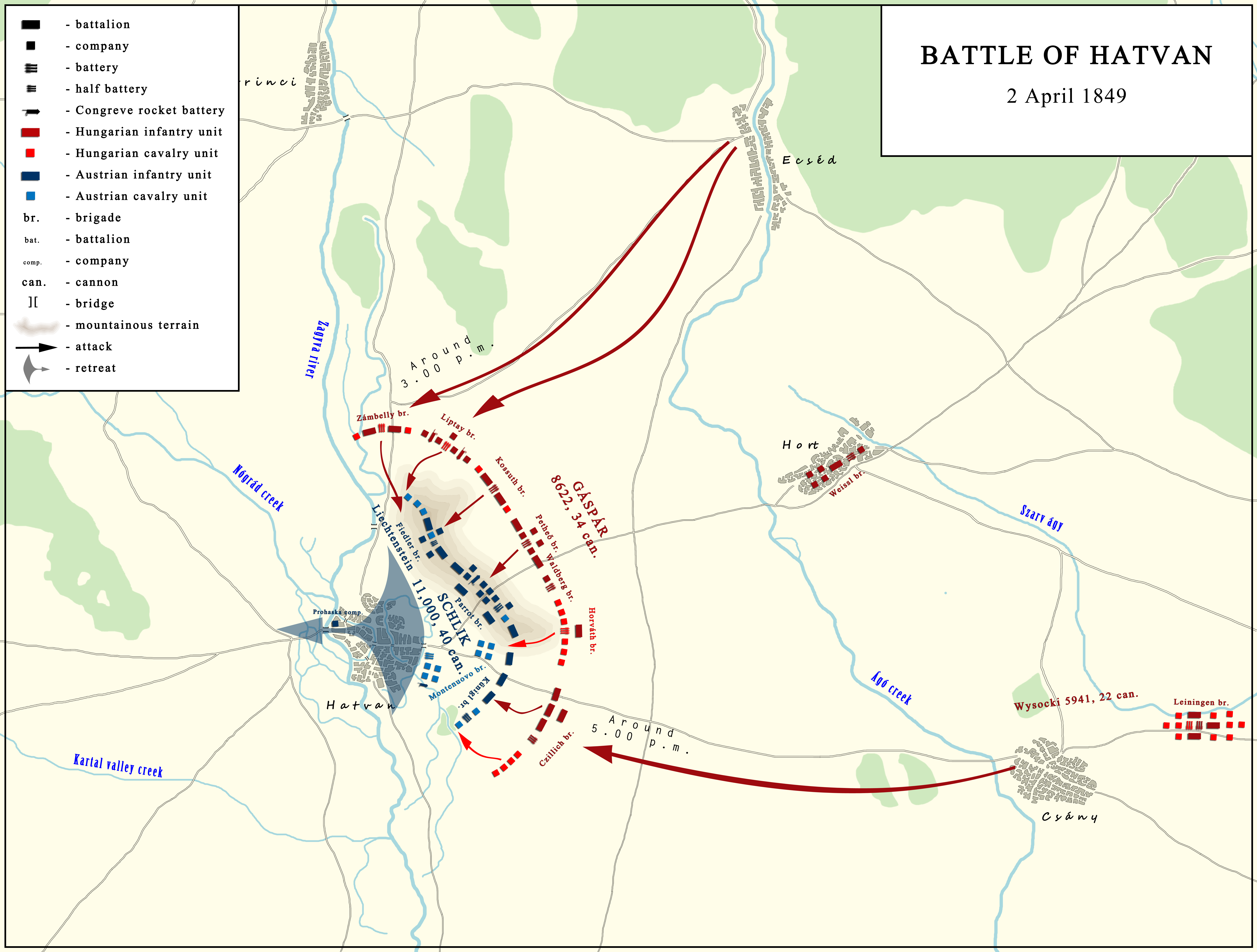
Battle of Hatvan, 2 April 1849

On the Hungarian side, in the morning of that day, the Poeltenberg division from the vanguard changed position with the Gáspár division from the rearguard. At 5:00 a.m., Gáspár and Poeltenberg made a cavalry reconnaissance towards Hatvan, reporting this to Görgei, who thought that the enemy had a squadron in front of Hort, while infantry and cavalry units were stationed in Hatvan and on the heights east of the town. After taking notice of this Gáspár and Poeltenberg retreated and the first took position to the west, while the second to east from Hort. After another reconnaissance made on the lead of a hussar detachment, Colonel Gáspár gave the order to his troops to take battle formation.

Meanwhile, Gáspár pushed his vanguard forward, ordering the division which stationed at Hort to advance further west. When the vanguard of the division crossed the Ágó creek west from Hort, they met with Schlik's corps vanguard, represented by the Parrot brigade, and immediately started the fight. Being stronger than the enemy, after the infantry and artillery were fully deployed, Gáspár's vanguard division pushed back the Parrot brigade, which was saved by the advancing bulk of the Schlik corps, which took a position with the Parrot brigade in the center, the rest of the Liechtenstein division on the left wing, while the right wing was formed by the Lobkowitz division led personally by General Franz Schlik, as it was shown earlier. The Gáspár division deployed west from Hort, north from it the Poeltenberg division, linking with the right wing of the Gáspár division. Gáspár sent the order to Lieutenant colonel Liptay to advance with his brigade from Ecséd, and secure the right flank of the Poeltenberg division. In this way Gáspár deployed his troops north and east from Hatvan, blocking the road towards Gyöngyös, and leaving the southeast direction open, where he waited for the support of the troops sent by Damjanich, about which he was informed by Görgei, who ordered him Gáspár to hold Hort at any costs, sending also 2 Congreve rockets launching racks and 2 grenadier companies. Poeltenberg's division deployed, its right wing represented by the Zámbelly brigade boldly advancing so much, that they took a section of the vine-growing hill. In this position they were waiting for the Liptay brigade to arrive.

At 11:30 Gáspár's vanguard reported that more Austrian cavalry squadrons were arriving together with many kaiserjägers. Gáspár sent two squadrons of hussars, but seeing that the imperials were sending more cavalry together with cannons, he ordered the two divisions to fall back a little and form battle order on the heights before the second stone bridge west of Hort. Due to the aspects of the future battlefield, Schlik's elite units were deployed on the right wing in a small depression, while Gáspár installed his bulk on the heights north from the main road, threatening the Austrian left wing with encirclement.

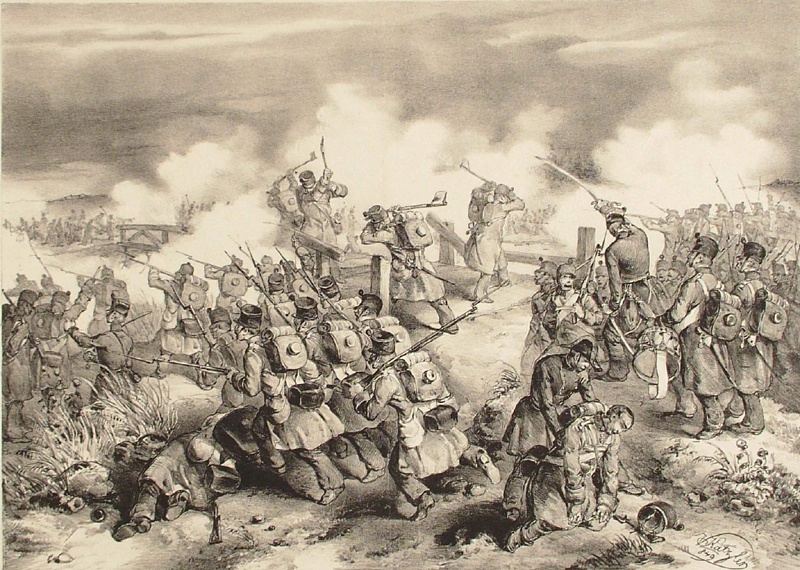
Battle of Hatvan. The Austrians destroy the bridge on the Zagyva river, before retreating.

Until 3:00 p.m. the battle continued mostly just with a cannonade. Gáspár was waiting for the Liptay and Zámbelly brigades from Ecséd to arrive before starting his own attack. Meanwhile, because of the Hungarian resistance, Schlik was unable to push forward either. At this moment the two brigades from Ecséd arrived and Gáspár gave the order to attack. He sent three brigades (the Kossuth, the Zámbelly, and the Liptay brigades) to outflank the enemy. The cavalry squadron and two cannons under Lieutenant-Colonel Lajos Zámbelly moved around the Austrian left wing, while Liptay's brigade attacked it from the side. For now Gáspár did not move while he waited for the encircling maneuvers from the wings to be completed. Poeltenberg's division advanced and started a concentric attack from three sides against the Austrian left, together with the Zámbélly and Liptay brigades. First the Zámbelly brigade advancing on the right, with the 1. cavalry battery and the cavalry howitzer battery shot so effectively the Austrians from the hills ridge, that they retreated behind the Strázsa hill. Zámbelly with 2 cannons supported by a cavalry company, took control over the hill, and with their fire started to support the advance of the Liptay brigade through the vineyards towards the Hatvan-Lőrinci road. In the meanwhile the rest of the Poeltenberg division cleaned the vine-growing hills from the Austrian troops. The cavalry battery split in two, and with precise shooting and with quick position-changing, prevented the enemy artillery to support their infantry, then after chasing away the Austrian cannons, unleashed grape shot on the retreating Austrian infantry. The Austrians left wing retreated towards Hatvan, where 2 batteries and a couple of Congreve rockets launching racks, supported by jägers and cavalry units, took defensive positions on the outskirts of the town. The Hungarian troops which advanced to the banks of the Zagyva river north from Hatvan, were held back by the Austrian batteries, against which the Hungarian cavalry battery tried to respond, chasing away the Austrian rockets. To remediate the situation, and to support the retreat of the troops, Schlik sent new batteries to the frontline. But the Hungarian artillery continued the successful bombardment of the Austrians, and after they hit and destroyed an ammunition wagon, the enemy batteries from the left wing started to retreat in the city. Now the Hungarian attacked the Austrian infantry from the left wing, remained without artillery support, and with the help of the Hungarian cannon fire, they pushed them further back towards the bridge over the Zagyva.

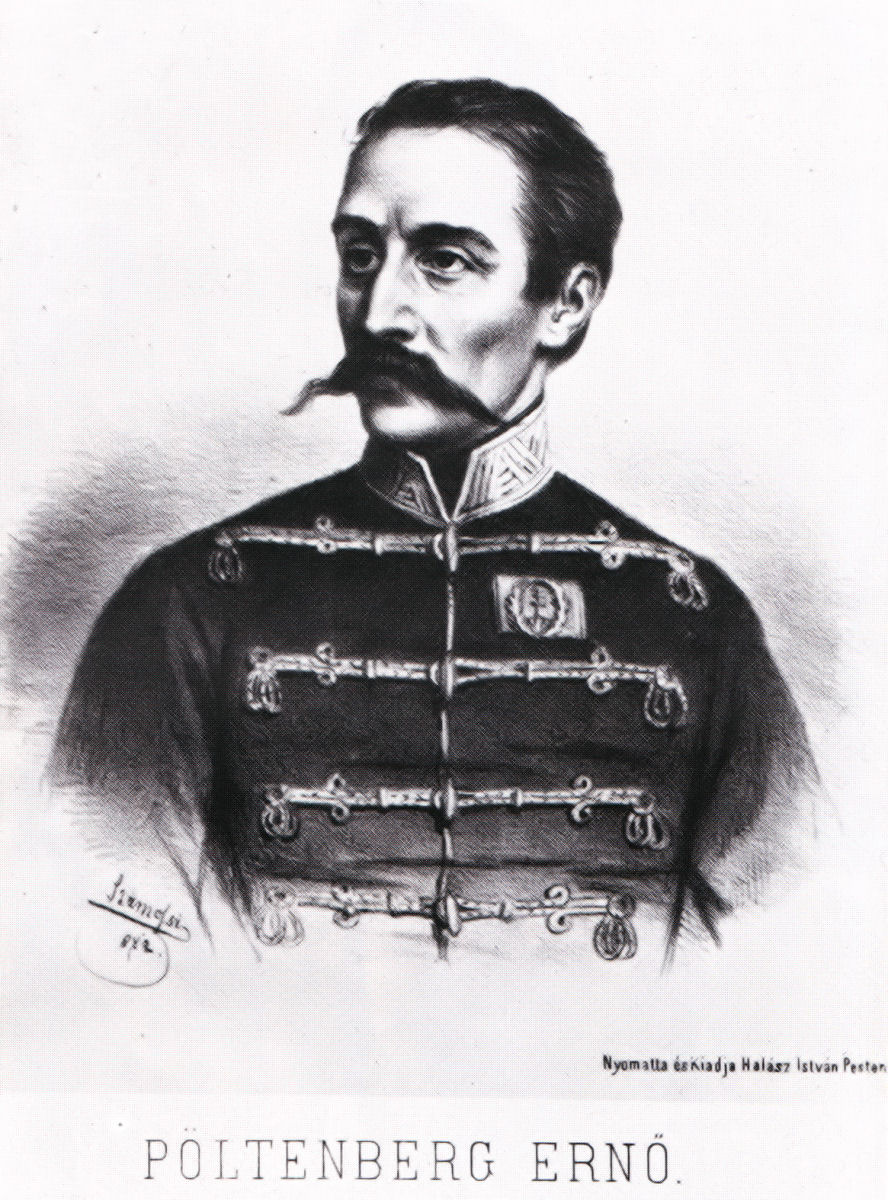
Ernő Poeltenberg

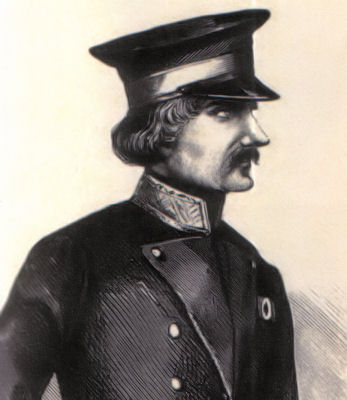
Józef Wysocki

During these fights, the Kossuth brigade of the Poeltenberg division as well as the Gáspár division remained in their position, and only their artillery shot at the Austrian troops. Although their artillery could not force the Austrians to retreat, nevertheless they managed to prevent them to attack, while the infantry units changed their positions to avoid being hit by the enemy projectiles. The evening was near when the Gáspár division and the Kossuth brigade were finally ordered to advance, while the Austrians retreated without any fight, enabling the Hungarians to occupy the vine-growing hills. The cause of the Austrian retreat was that Schlik concluded that his army is outnumbered by the Hungarians, whom he considered to have between 12,000 and 15,000 soldiers against his 11,000 troops, and he also thought that his troops are in a dangerous position, and their retreat would be obstructed by the Hatvan Strait, so, after positioning some of his infantry and artillery on the heights in front of the bridge on the Zagyva river, he ordered his sappers to build another bridge to enable him to withdraw his troops, guns, and baggage from Hatvan as fast as possible. The retreat was started by the left wing under the lead of Lieutenant General Prince Franz de Paula of Liechtenstein (as mentioned earlier), followed by the Parrot brigade, while the right wing led by Schlik had to resist until the rest of the troops retreated. The Zámbelly brigade of the Poeltenberg division followed the retreating troops from the north, pressing their back as hard they could.

Meanwhile, General Damjanich of Hungarian III. Corps had sent Józef Wysocki's division to Csány. When Wysocki, during the noon hours, arrived in Csány, he heard the cannonade from the direction of Hatvan, so he immediately gave the order to advance, threatening Schlik's right wing with encirclement. Approaching the town, the infantry battery was sent to reinforce the Gáspár division, while the Major branch of the Ferdinand hussars with a cavalry battery was sent in two columns against the right wing of the Austrians. Arriving there around 5:00 p.m. the vanguard of the Wysocki division, represented by the Czillich brigade approached Hatvan, while the Ferdinand hussars led by Major Szentmiklósy and the cavalry battery under the leadership of Captain Német attacked the Austrian artillery, protected by 3 companies of Civalart uhlans from the heights in front of the town. Now the Austrians were in danger to be encircled from both left and right. Wysocki's approach was observed also by Schlik, who was supervising the retreat, and the Austrian retreat became more panic-stricken. The Ferdinand hussars repeated attacks forced the Austrian artillery to retreat while the uhlans were crushed. The Austrian infantry too retreated from the heights in Hatvan.

The Austrian retreat was covered by their batteries installed on the other bank of the Zagyva river, south to the main road, while the infantry tried to slow the Hungarian advance, to enable the troops to cross on the other bank of the river. The retreat started in order, although the Austrian units which were defending the entrances of the city, especially on the right wing, were subjected to heavy pressure. Also the inhabitants of the city were involved in the battle, many of them starting to shoot at them from the windows of their houses. The advance of the Hungarians was slowed by the fact that the Austrians destroyed all bridges over the creeks which lay in front of them. The Hungarian troops which entered Hatvan, advanced through the streets, trying to catch up with the retreating Austrians. The fight on the streets of Hatvan was especially fierce in the main square of the city, where the Austrians tried to hold back as long as possible the Hungarians, to dismantle the bridges. but approaching to the Zagyva bridge, they were heavily hit by the Austrian artillery, as well by the Austrian jägers who protected the bridge, killing many soldiers. This forced the Hungarian soldiers to hide in houses and side streets, and despite the music of the hussar orchestra, which tried to encourage them, they did not move forward. Another obstacle before the Hungarian soldiers was the destroyed bridge over the mill branch of the Zagyva. This bridge had to be rebuilt in order this river branch to be crossed.

Around the two bridges over the Zagyva river, the Austrian troops lost any organization, trying, by pushing each other, to cross the river. Luckily the Austrian rearguard fought and held back the attacking Hungarian troops. The last Austrian unit which covered the retreat over the bridge was the Prohaska infantry company led by Captain Wilhelm von Kalchberg. This company was ordered by Schlik to guard the bridge before the battle started. While they were shooting at the enemy, 6 sappers dismantled the bridge over the Zagyva. To shoot more rapidly and efficiently, Kalchberg organized his company into groups of four soldiers: while 3 of them were shooting, the fourth was loading their rifles. They were supported also by the Austrian artillery from the other side of the river. In the end the Prohaska infantry which defended the Zagyva bridges and covered the imperial troops crossing to the other bank succeeded in demolishing both bridges, thus preventing the Hungarians from catching and encircling them. For this act of heroism Captain Kalchberg was awarded the Military Order of Maria Theresa. To cover the Prohaska companies retreat, Schlik sent cavalry platoon and a battery to do a diversion attack, and after that to burn the town, which, luckily they did not succeed. After the bulk of Schlik's corps retreated, Wysocki's Polish Legion crossed the Zagyva, wanting to pursue the Austrians, but Gáspár forbid this. They were prevented to continue the attack also by the fact that the Prohaska company was still there, shooting at them, and trying to obstruct the rebuilding of the bridge, until the III. corps retreated to a safe distance. At the end of the day, also the Leiningen brigade, which represented the bulk of the almost 6000 soldiers strong Wysocki division, arrived from Jászfényszaru, but then the battle was already over.

The Hungarians could not pursue the Austrians because of the demolished bridges, so they installed their artillery South and North of the town, but this could not cause much damage to the retreating enemy. To prevent the Hungarians from attacking the Austrian troops which were retreating towards Aszód and Bag, Schlik took a position with his cavalry and artillery on the right bank of Zagyva, facing Hatvan, but when he saw that this will not happen, at the nightfall, his cavalry retreated between Bag and Hatvan, while his infantry and artillery moved to Aszód, then later to Gödöllő.

== Aftermath ==
With this battle Colonel Gáspár overachieved his duty, defeating and chasing away one of the best Austrian corps, led by one of the most capable imperial officers, although Görgei did not demand this from him, his mission being to tie down the enemy troops on the Zagyva's line. Although this was his first battle as a corps commander Gáspár, made the best choice by not attacking the Austrians in their very favorable defensive positions from the front, but encircling them, first from the right, then, after the arrival of the detached units of the III. corps, also from the left, forcing Schlik, to retreat without fighting from the center, thanks to which, they were the attacking side, at the end of the battle the Hungarians had only minor losses. Hearing the result of the battle, Görgei ordered Gáspár to retreat towards Hort. After the darkness was installed, the commander of the VII. corps accomplished this order by retreating to the encampments around Hort, leaving in Hatvan only a battalion, and a detachment at the bridge from the Gombos waste. The Wysocki division retreated towards Csány in the next day.

The battle of Hatvan was not a very important victory, but its influence on the morale of the Hungarian troops was remarkable. The most important result of the battle was that Gáspár succeeded in making Schlik think that he faced the whole Hungarian army, not just VII. Corps. Gáspár knew that he cannot continue his attack against Schlik's retreating troops, because this could reveal the fact that he commands only a corps and not the whole Hungarian army. This was one of the causes why he forbid his troops to pursue the enemy. Being isolated, from the other three corps for a couple of days, made Gáspár's situation dangerous, because an Austrian attack with important forces could easily defeat his troops, which would have opened the way to the temporary capital city of Debrecen. So Gáspár could neither advance nor retreat from the Zagyva line because both of these choices could bring a catastrophe for the Hungarian revolution. After the battle, judging by the force of the Hungarian attack, and his sightings of the Hungarian troops on the battlefield Schlik suspected that he did not face an entire army, but only a corps, and because of this, he was thinking about risking another attack, but Windisch-Grätz did not permit him.

Windisch-Grätz continued to be unsure about the plans and dispositions of the Hungarian main army, and because of this, he remained mostly incapable of stopping them from advancing from two sides on his headquarters at Gödöllő. After the victory at Hatvan, the other, more numerous Hungarian army, consisting of three corps, won another victory at Tápióbicske then approached Isaszeg where the decisive battle of the first phase of the Spring Campaign took place on 6 April.

This victory earned Colonel András Gáspár the rank of general, together with the position of leader of VII. Corps Before this he was the only interim commander of this corps, standing in for Görgei who had to hand it over when he took over command of the whole Hungarian army except the Transylvanian and Southern armies. Although Lajos Aulich had been designated the new commander of VII. Corps, he was away, so until he arrived, Gáspár as its senior staff officer had had to perform the role.

== Sources ==
- Bánlaky, József (2001). A magyar nemzet hadtörténelme (The Military History of the Hungarian Nation XXI) (in Hungarian). Budapest: Arcanum Adatbázis.
- Csikány, Tamás (1996). "A hatvani ütközet". In Horváth, László (ed.). Hatvany Lajos Múzeum Füzetek 13. A tavaszi hadjárat. Az 1996. március 14-i tudományos konferencia anyaga (in Hungarian). Hatvan Hatvany Lajos Múzeum. ISBN 963-04-7279-1.
- Hermann, Róbert (2018). "A tápióbicskei ütközet. 1849 április 4-én" [The Battle of Tápiobicske. On 4 April 1849]. In Pelyach, István (ed.). Damjanich János : "a mindig győztes" tábornok [János Damjanich : "The Always Victorious General"]. New York: Line Design. pp. 171–194. ISBN 978-963-480-006-4.
- Hermann, Róbert, ed. (1996). Az 1848–1849 évi forradalom és szabadságharc története ("The history of the Hungarian Revolution and War of Independence of 1848–1849) (in Hungarian). Budapest: Videopont. p. 464. ISBN 963-8218-20-7.
- Hermann, Róbert (2004). Az 1848–1849-es szabadságharc nagy csatái ("Great battles of the Hungarian Revolution of 1848–1849") (in Hungarian). Budapest: Zrínyi. p. 408. ISBN 963-327-367-6.
- Hermann, Róbert (2001). Az 1848–1849-es szabadságharc hadtörténete ("Military History of the Hungarian Revolution of 1848–1849") (in Hungarian). Budapest: Korona Kiadó. p. 424. ISBN 963-9376-21-3.
- Bóna, Gábor (1987). Tábornokok és törzstisztek a szabadságharcban 1848–49 ("Generals and Staff Officers in the War of Freedom 1848–1849") (in Hungarian). Budapest: Zrínyi Katonai Kiadó. p. 430. ISBN 963-326-343-3.
- Nobili, Johann. Hungary 1848: The Winter Campaign. Edited and translated Christopher Pringle. Warwick, UK: Helion & Company Ltd., 2021.
- Székelyné Kőrösi, Ilona (2002). Kecskemétiek a szabadságharcban. II. Kecskemét is kiállítja. Gáspár András, Erdősi Imre, Lestár Péter, Muraközy János, 71. honvédzászlóalj + 16. (Károlyi) huszárezred, Kecskemét város szabadcsapata ("The Citizens of Kecskemét in the Freedom War. II. Kecskemét also Exhibits it. Gáspár András, Erdősi Imre, Lestár Péter, Muraközy János, the 71th Honvéd Battalion, the Guerilla of Kecskemét") (in Hungarian). Kecskemét: Nemzeti Kulturális Örökség Minisztériuma. p. 224. ISBN 963-7216-74-X.
