= József Bajza =

Hungarian poet and critic

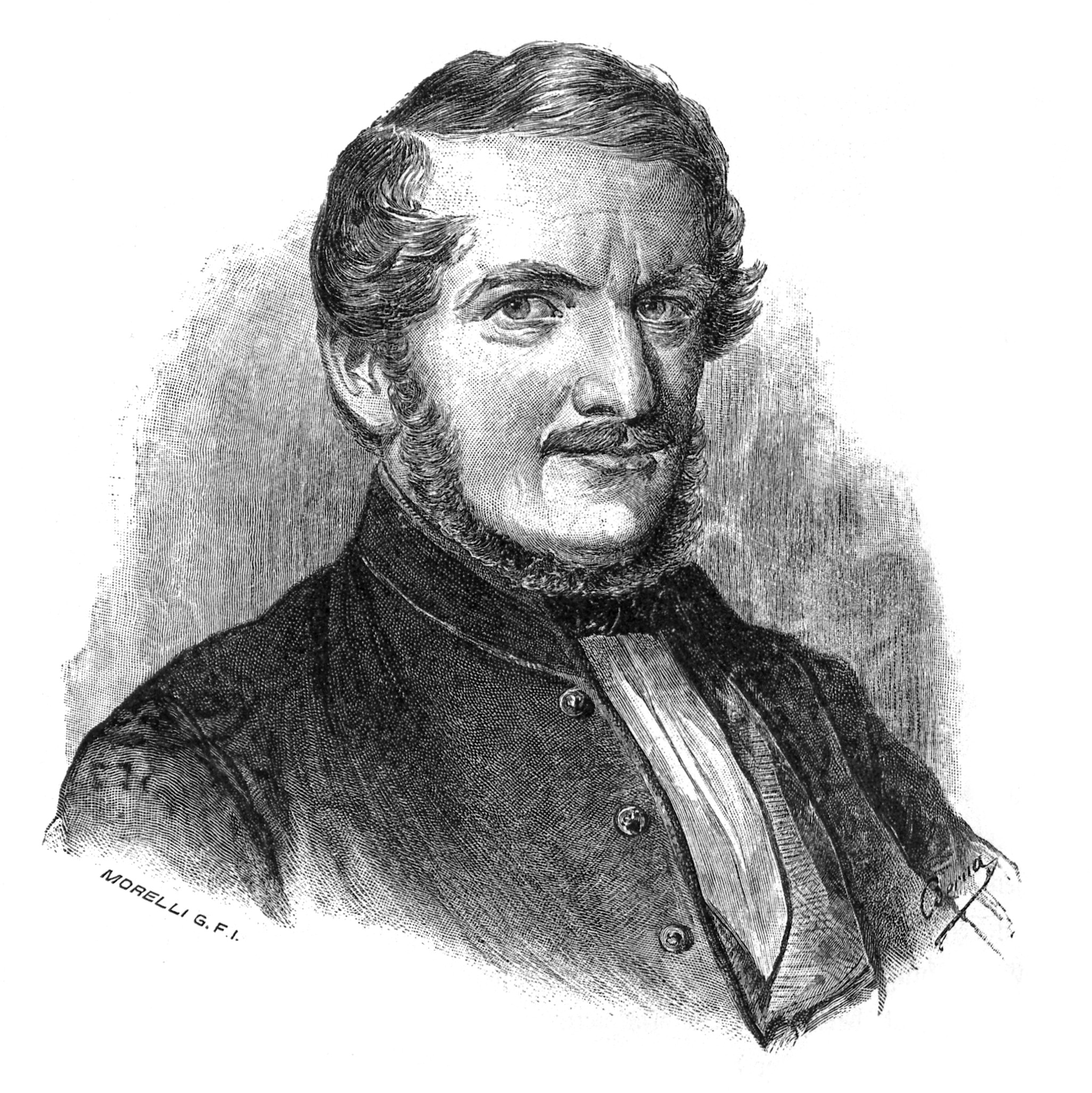
József Bajza

József Bajza (31 January 1804 – 3 March 1858) was a Hungarian poet and critic.

== Life ==
Bajza was born at Szűcsi and was first published in Károly Kisfaludy's Aurora, a literary paper he edited from 1830 to 1837. He also contributed substantially to the Kritikai Lapok, the Athenaeum, and the Figyelmező (Observer). His reviews of dramatic art were considered the best of these miscellaneous writings. In 1830 he published translations of some foreign dramas, Ausländische Bühne, and in 1835 a collection of his own poems. In 1837 he was made director of the newly established national theatre at Pest. He then, for some years, devoted himself to historical writing, and published in succession the Historical Library (Történeti Könyvtár), 6 vols., 1843–1845; the Modern Plutarch (Uj Plutarch), 1845–1847; and the Universal History (Világtörténet), 1847. These works are partly translations from German authors. In 1847 Bajza edited the journal of the opposition, Ellenor, at Leipzig, and in March 1848 Lajos Kossuth made him editor of his paper, Kossuth Hirlapja. In 1850 he fell ill with a brain disease, and he died in Pest in 1858.

== Legacy ==
- In Szűcsi, a permanent exhibition about his life and work can be viewed at the Bajza Memorial House.
- In Budapest, a bust of him is displayed in the lobby of the National Theatre.
- In Hatvan, Bajza József High School is named after him.
- Several cities and towns in Hungary have named streets or public squares after him, including Békéscsaba, Budapest, Cibakháza, Gyula, Hódmezővásárhely, Jászszentlászló, Kiskunfélegyháza, Kiskunhalas, Makó, Nagykanizsa, Szeged, Tiszakécske, Tótkomlós, Vésztő, Debrecen, and Dombóvár.
