= Szűcsi =

- Village
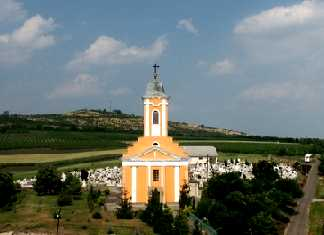
- Exaltation of the Holy Cross Church

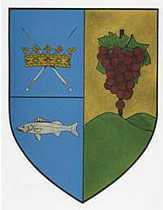
- Coat of arms

- Location in Hungary
- Coordinates: 47°48′07″N 19°45′43″E
- Country: Hungary
- County: Heves
- District: Hatvan
- First mentioned: 1267

Government
  - Mayor: Krisztina Kovács, Mrs. Hordós (Fidesz–KDNP)

Area
  - Total: 17.38 km^{2} (6.71 sq mi)

Population (2022)
  - Total: 1,425
  - Density: 81.99/km^{2} (212.4/sq mi)
- Time zone: UTC+1 (CET)
  - Summer (DST): UTC+2 (CEST)
- Postal code: 3034
- Area code: 37
- Website: www.szucsi.hu

Szűcsi is a village in Heves County, Hungary, beside the Ágó creek, under the Mátra mountain ranges. As of the 2022 census, it has a population of 1425 (see Demographics). The village is located 9.4 km from (Nr. 81) the Hatvan–Fiľakovo railway line, 9.9 km from the main road 21 and 21.4 km from the M3 motorway. The closest train station with public transport is in the village of Zagyvaszántó.

== History ==
Artifacts from the late Bronze Age and the 9th century were found within the boundaries of the settlement. Its first documented mention occurred in 1267 in the form Swch. In the 15th century, it was listed under the names Zeuch, Zewchy, Zwchy, owned by the Szücsy family, and then King Zsigmond donated it to Máté Pálóczy. In 1527 it became the property of Zsigmond Ráskay. The village church was built by Károly Ráby in 1828. The population was mostly engaged in viticulture. Two lignite mines were opened in the second half of the 1950s, but they were closed after the 1959 accident in which 31 people died. The notable native of the village is the poet József Bajza (1804–1858).

== Demographics ==
According the 2022 census, 92.7% of the population were of Hungarian ethnicity, 2.3% were Gipsy and 7.2% were did not wish to answer. The religious distribution was as follows: 50.7% Roman Catholic, 1.7% Calvinist, 7.8% non-denominational, and 37.1% did not wish to answer. 5 people live in two outskirts close to the village.

Population by years:

Year	1870	1880	1890	1900	1910	1920	1930	1941
Population	973	764	975	1015	1151	1265	1458	1684
Year	1949	1960	1970	1980	1990	2001	2011	2022
Population	1873	2003	2063	1969	1823	1717	1617	1425

== Politics ==
Mayors since 1990:

- 1990–1998: Károly Kulcsár (until 1994 independent, but after that MSZP)
- 1998–2008: István Szekeres (independent)
- 2008–2019: István Berta (independent)
- 2019–: Krisztina Kovács, Mrs. Hordós (until 2024 independent, but after that Fidesz–KDNP)
