= Rózsaszentmárton =

- Village
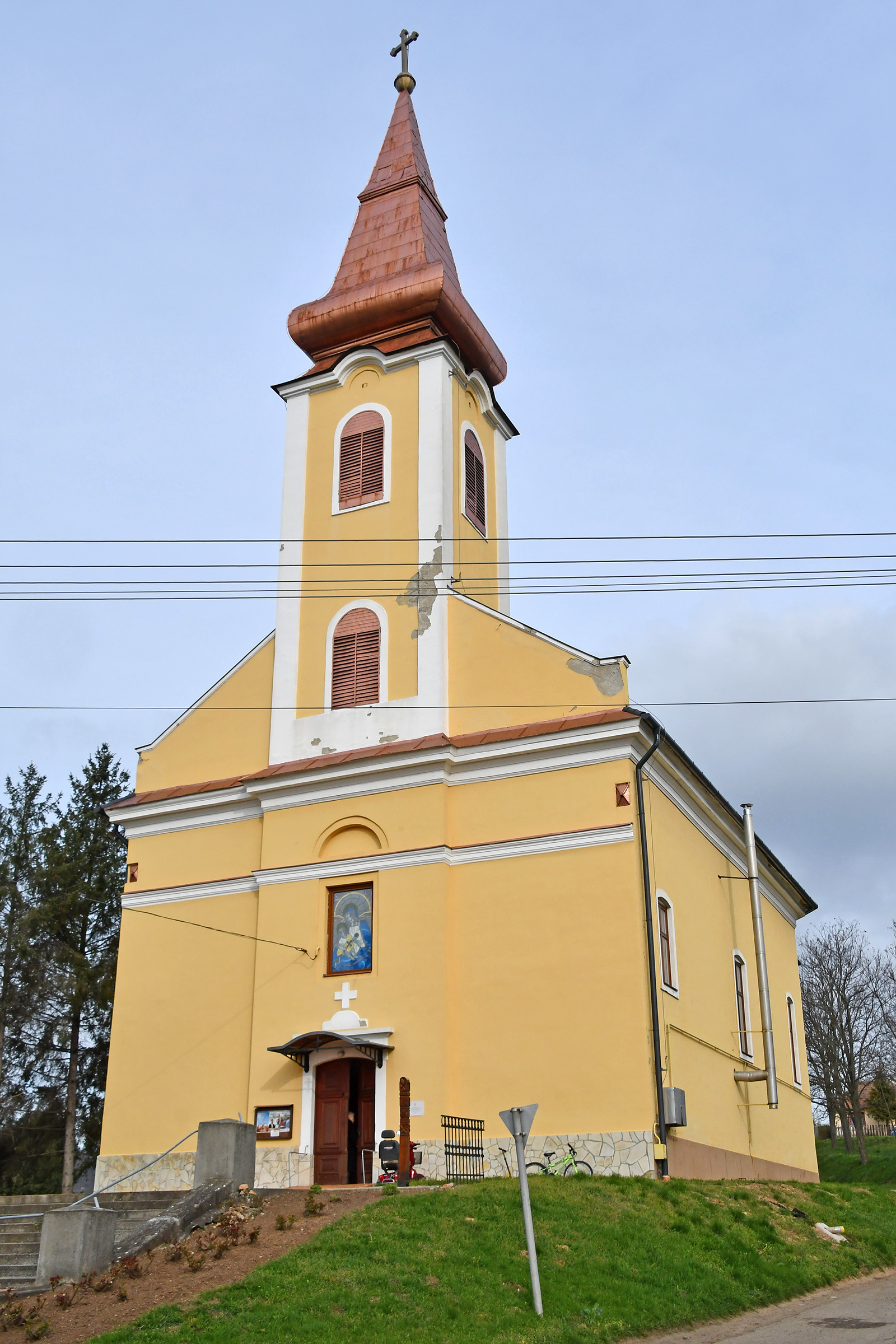
- St. Martin Church

- Coat of arms

- Location in Hungary
- Coordinates: 47°47′02″N 19°44′28″E
- Country: Hungary
- County: Heves
- District: Hatvan
- First mentioned: 1231

Government
  - Mayor: Márk Huczka (Ind.)

Area
  - Total: 16.31 km^{2} (6.30 sq mi)

Population (2022)
  - Total: 1,864
  - Density: 114.3/km^{2} (296.0/sq mi)
- Time zone: UTC+1 (CET)
  - Summer (DST): UTC+2 (CEST)
- Postal code: 3033
- Area code: 37
- Website: www.rozsaszentmarton.hu

Rózsaszentmárton is a village in Heves County, Hungary, located beside the Ágó creek, under the Mátra mountain ranges. As of the 2022 census, it has a population of 1854 (see Demographics). The village is located 6.5 km from (Nr. 81) the Hatvan–Fiľakovo railway line, 7.0 km from the main road 21 and 18.0 km from the M3 motorway. The closest train station with public transport is in Zagyvaszántó.

== History ==
An independent village arose between 1000 and 1050 in the area that was already inhabited in prehistoric times. It was probably donated by King Samuel to a knight named Fanchal, in whose memory the settlement bore the name Fancsal for centuries. But the first mention of the village is recorded in 1231. In 1325 King Charles I gave it to Demeter Nekcsei, but in 1414 it was already owned by the Jákófi and Fedémesi families. Only 4 families lived in the village in 1564 and only 6 in 1690. In the 18th century it was part of the Hatvan manor. The population growned to 27 families to 1720. King Charles III given Fancsal to Count Gundaker Starhemberg in 1723, what bought by Count Antal Grassalkovich in 1741. Grassalkovich built the Roman Catholic church of the village in 1780 and the parish house in 1800. The owner of Fancsal was Georgios Sinas, then Simon Sinas between 1841 and 1864. The population lived from agriculture: wood extraction and winemaking. In 1873 the cholera, than in 1889 the phylloxera destroyed the population and grapes.The first lignite mine started in 1890, but its bankcrupted. In 1903 the village got its current name from the wild rose bushes at the border of the village and the patron saint of the church. In 1904 the winemaking at the village was restarted with state support and in 1917 the mining was restarted. In the 1950s the number of shafts grew and a miners' school and apartments were created. The appearance of open-pit mining marked the end of mining in the settlement in 1968. The memory of the mining is preserved in the Lignite Mining Memorial House, the entrance of the Ursitz shaft, the E-303 excavator monument and the tradition of the Miner's Day and the Barbara Day. After 1999 built up the Saint Stephen fountain, the new village hall, a hostel and the retirement home.The notable native of the village is Dániel Csabai (1947–) electric engineer.

== Demographics ==
According the 2022 census, 94.6% of the population were of Hungarian ethnicity, 0.5% were German and 5.4% were did not wish to answer. The religious distribution was as follows: 42.0% Roman Catholic, 3.3% Calvinist, 0.5% Greek Catholic, 15.0% non-denominational, and 35.8% did not wish to answer. 5 people live a mine camp beside of the Shaft I.

Population by years:

Year	1870	1880	1890	1900	1910	1920	1930	1941
Population	997	930	1135	1279	1394	1678	2073	2219
Year	1949	1960	1970	1980	1990	2001	2011	2022
Population	2443	2906	2800	2487	2209	2103	2009	1854

== Politics ==
Mayors since 1990:

- 1990–2002: Mrs. János Láng (independent)
- 2002–2024: Mrs. János Sipos (until 2019 independent, from then Fidesz–KDNP)
- 2024–: Márk Huczka (independent)
