= Kerekharaszt =

- Village (község)
- Location of Heves County in Hungary

- Location in Hungary
- Coordinates: 47°39′43″N 19°37′30″E
- Country: Hungary
- Region: Northern Hungary
- County: Heves County
- District: Hatvan

Government
  - Mayor: Szabó Ádám (Fidesz-KDNP)

Area
  - Total: 14.36 km^{2} (5.54 sq mi)

Population (2015)
  - Total: 958
  - Density: 66.7/km^{2} (173/sq mi)
- Time zone: UTC+1 (CET)
  - Summer (DST): UTC+2 (CEST)
- Postal code: 3009
- Area code: 37
- Website: http://www.kerekharaszt.hu/

Kerekharaszt is a village in Heves County, located in Northern Hungary Region of Hungary.
