= Hatvan District =

Hatvan District Hatvani járás
- Districts of Hungary
- Coat of arms

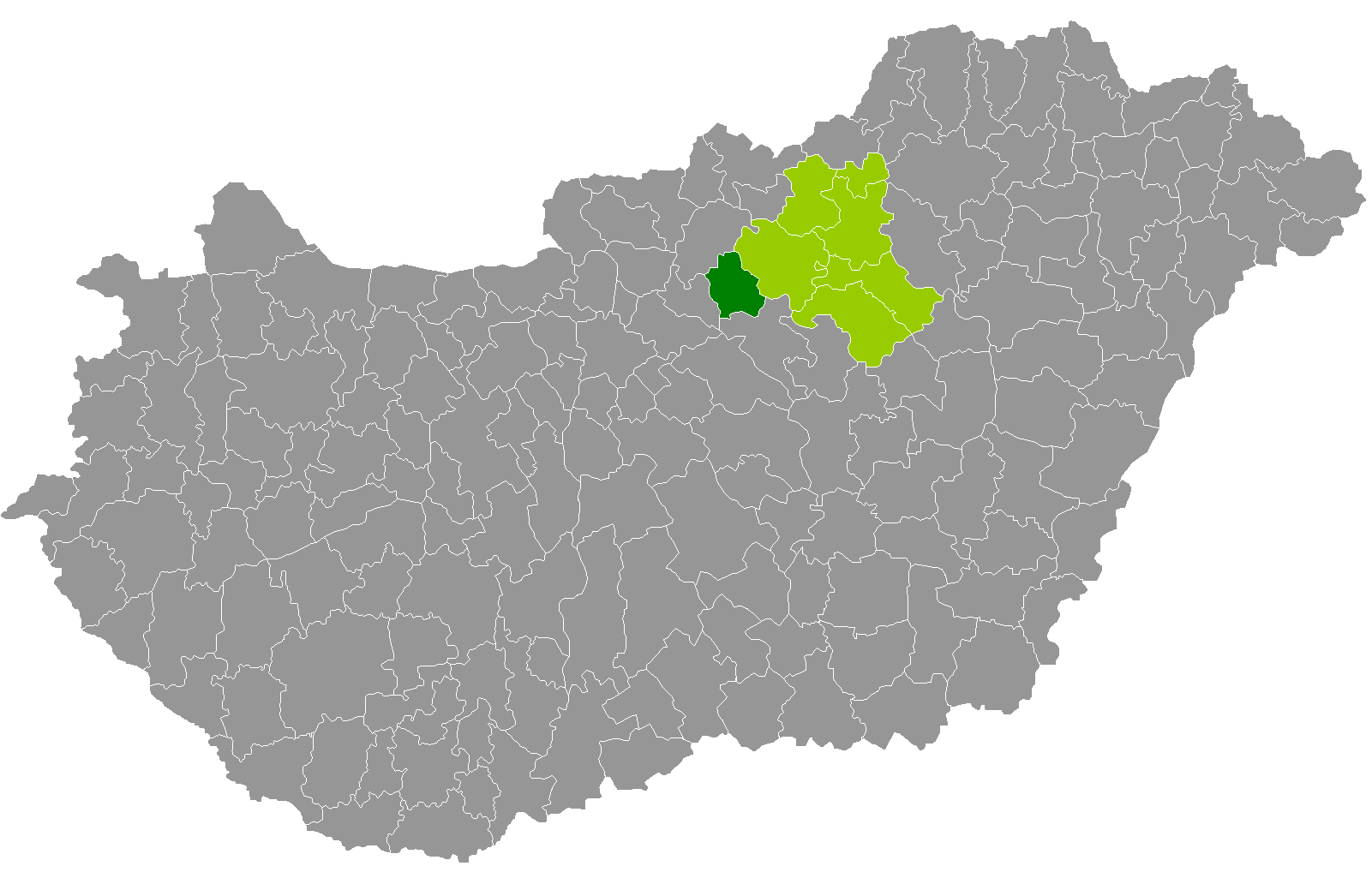
- Hatvan District within Hungary and Heves County.
- Coordinates: 47.67°N 19.68°E
- Country: Hungary
- County: Heves
- District seat: Hatvan

Area
  - Total: 352.16 km^{2} (135.97 sq mi)
  - Rank: 6th in Heves

Population (2011 census)
  - Total: 51,246
  - Rank: 3rd in Heves
  - Density: 146/km^{2} (380/sq mi)

Hatvan (Hungarian: Hatvani járás) is a district in western part of Heves County in Hungary. Hatvan is also the name of the town where the district seat is found. The district is located in the Northern Hungary Statistical Region.

== Geography ==
Hatvan District borders with Pásztó District (Nógrád County) to the north, Gyöngyös District to the east, Jászberény District (Jász-Nagykun-Szolnok County) to the south, Aszód District (Pest County) to the west. The number of the inhabited places in Hatvan District is 14.

== Municipalities ==
The district has 2 towns and 12 villages. (ordered by population, as of 1 January 2012)

- Apc (2,552)
- Boldog (2,975)
- Csány (2,204)
- Ecséd (3,193)
- **Hatvan** (20,259) – district seat
- Heréd (1,976)
- Hort (3,627)
- Kerekharaszt (707)
- **Lőrinci** (5,880)
- Nagykökényes (586)
- Petőfibánya (2,754)
- Rózsaszentmárton (1,949)
- Szűcsi (1,462)
- Zagyvaszántó (1,923)

The bolded municipalities are cities.

== Demographics ==
Religion in Hatvan District (2011 census)
1. Catholic Church (55.8%)
2. Greek Catholicism (0.30%)
3. Calvinism (3.10%)
4. Lutheranism (0.80%)
5. Other religions (1.20%)
6. Non-religious (13.2%)
7. Atheists (0.80%)
8. Undeclared (24.8%)

In 2011, it had a population of 51,246 and the population density was 146/km².

Year	County population	Change
2011	51,246	n/a

=== Ethnicity ===
Besides the Hungarian majority, the main minorities are the Roma (approx. 1,500), German (200) and Romanian (100).

Total population (2011 census): 51,246
Ethnic groups (2011 census): Identified themselves: 46,763 persons:

- Hungarians: 44,794 (95.79%)
- Gypsies: 1,254 (2.68%)
- Others and indefinable: 715 (1.53%)

Approx. 4,500 persons in Hatvan District did not declare their ethnic group at the 2011 census.

=== Religion ===
Religious adherence in the county according to 2011 census:

- Catholic – 28,787 (Roman Catholic – 28,620; Greek Catholic – 159);
- Reformed – 1,601;
- Evangelical – 398;
- other religions – 631;
- Non-religious – 6,755;
- Atheism – 397;
- Undeclared – 12,677.

== Gallery ==
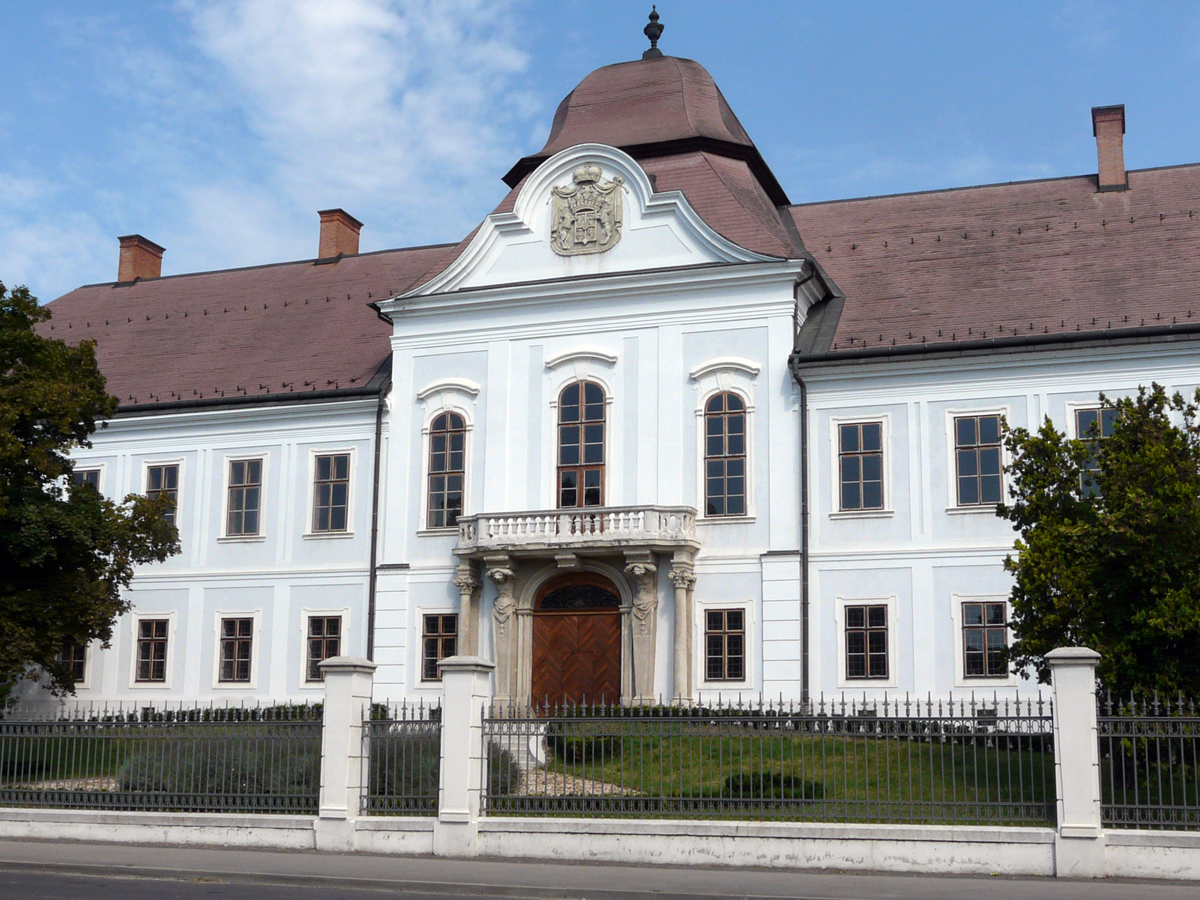
Hatvan, Grassalkovich Mansion

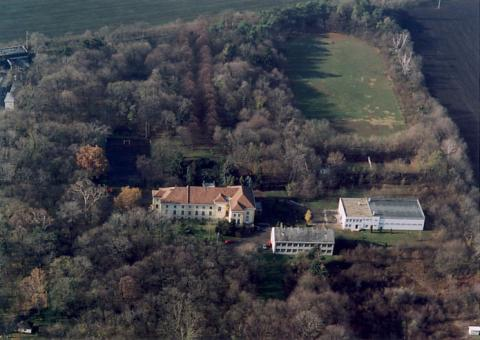
Aerial view of Lőrinci

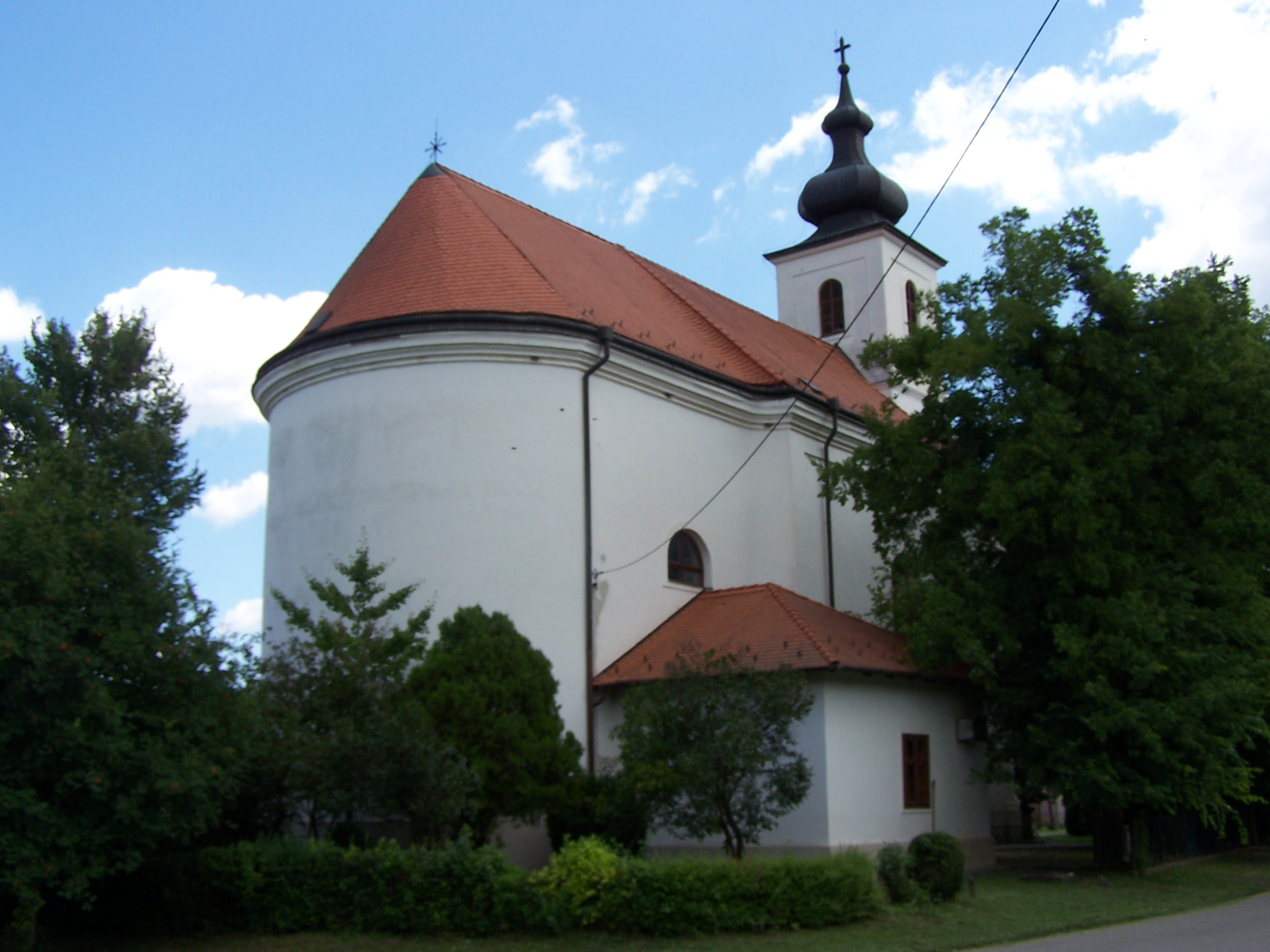
All Saints Church in Heréd

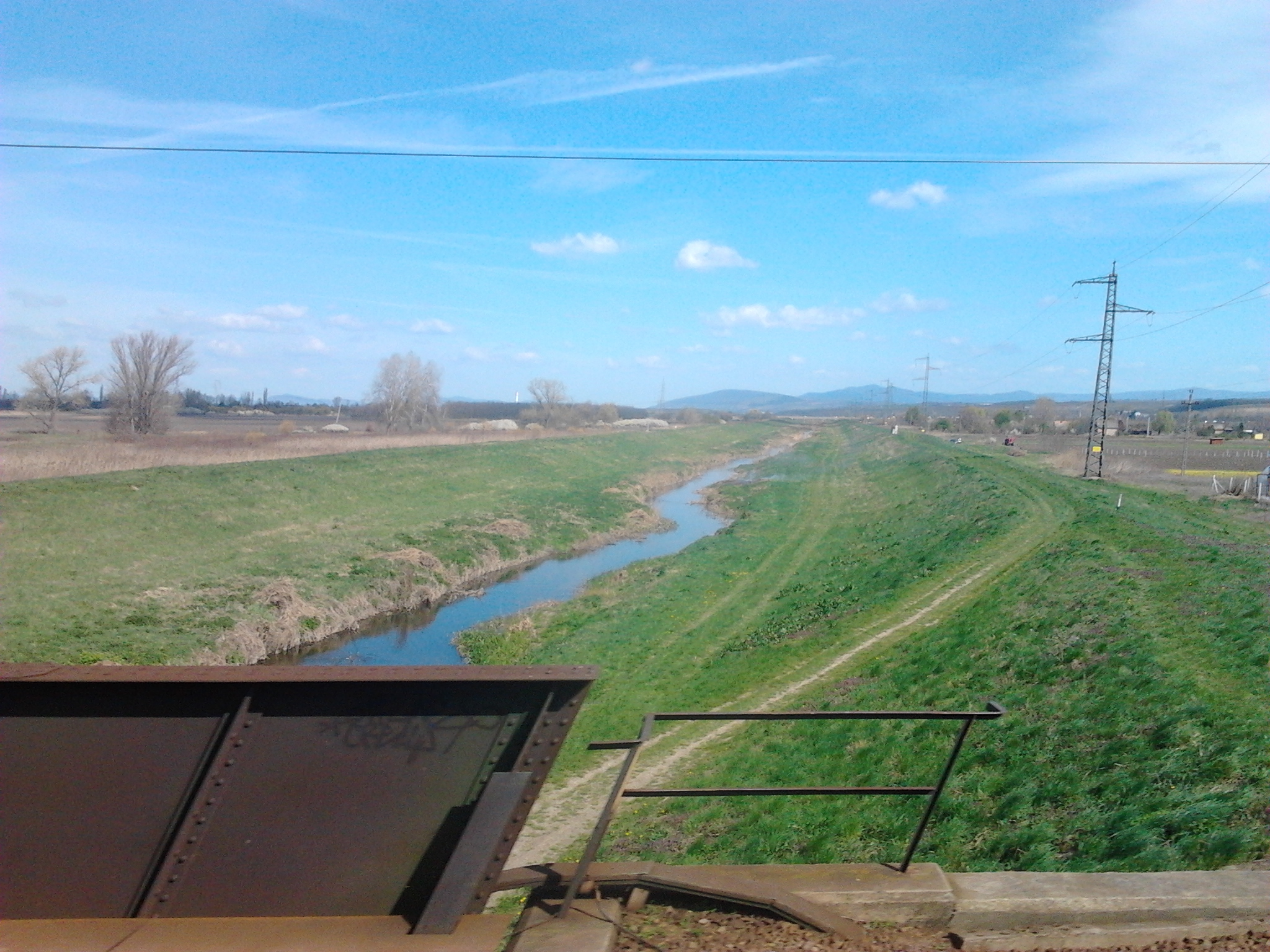
Zagyva river near Hatvan

== See also ==
- List of cities and towns of Hungary
