= Apc, Hungary =

Apc
- Village
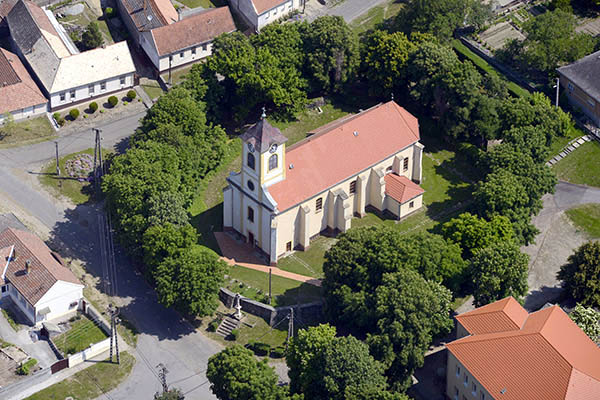
- King Saint Stephen Church

- Coat of arms

- Location in Hungary
- Coordinates: 47°47′46″N 19°41′23″E
- Country: Hungary
- County: Heves
- District: Hatvan
- First mentioned: 1332

Government
  - Mayor: István Juhász (Ind.)

Area
  - Total: 20.46 km^{2} (7.90 sq mi)

Population (2022)
  - Total: 2,452
  - Density: 119.8/km^{2} (310.4/sq mi)
- Time zone: UTC+1 (CET)
  - Summer (DST): UTC+2 (CEST)
- Postal code: 3032
- Area code: 37
- Website: www.apc.hu

Apc is a village in Heves County, Hungary, beside the Zagyva river, under the Mátra mountain ranges. As of the 2022 census, it had a population of 2452. The village is located 2.2 km from the (Nr. 81) Hatvan–Fiľakovo railway line, 3.5 km from the main road 21 and 15.7 km from the M3 motorway. The village has its own train station under the name Apc-Zagyvaszántó in the administrative area of the village, but it is closer to Zagyvaszántó.

== History ==
During excavations, traces of a Neolithic settlement and 7-8th century graves were found. The first written mention of the village are in the papal tithe list of 1332-37 in the form Opucz and it belongs to Gergely Opuz. In the 15th century, it was owned by the Szántai, Cserői and Radnóti families. The population engaged in farming and wine production. Somlyó hill, rising above the village, got its name from the training of hunting falcons (sólyom). The population of the village fled raids by the Ottomans, but in the 18th century it was already a market town and three national fairs were held. The village was bought by Szent-Ivány Farkas in 1873, who built his castle here in 1876. He built an industrial railway from the railway station to the quarry. The brick factory opened in 1905. Between the two world wars, an electricity network was built. In 1944 the Jewish families were deported. 345 hectares of land were divided from noble estates after 1945. Three cooperatives were founded in Apc after 1950, which merged in 1974.

== Demographics ==
According the 2022 census, 89.9% of the population were of Hungarian ethnicity, 2.1% were Romani and 10.0% did not wish to answer. The religious distribution was as follows: 35.8% Roman Catholic, 2.9% Calvinist, 12.6% non-denominational, and 44.6% did not wish to answer. 2425 people live in the village and 18 in the Gyár Street, which is 1.6 km away from the village, beside the railway station. Another 12 people live on 2 farms.

Population by years:

| Year | 1870 | 1880 | 1890 | 1900 | 1910 | 1920 | 1930 | 1941 |
|---|---|---|---|---|---|---|---|---|
| Population | 1293 | 1346 | 1767 | 2071 | 2287 | 2445 | 2946 | 2978 |
| Year | 1949 | 1960 | 1970 | 1980 | 1990 | 2001 | 2011 | 2022 |
| Population | 3152 | 3575 | 3545 | 3369 | 2900 | 2790 | 2640 | 2452 |

== Politics ==
Mayors since 1990:

- 1990–2010: Gábor Gémes (independent)
- 2010–2014: Elemér József Bulcsú (Fidesz–KDNP)
- 2014–: István Juhász (independent)
