= Jászszentlászló =

Coordinates: 46°34′N 19°46′E

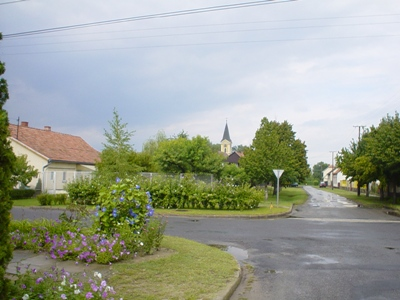
- Interactive map of Jászszentlászló
- Country: Hungary
- County: Bács-Kiskun

Area
  - Total: 60.34 km^{2} (23.30 sq mi)

Population (2002)
  - Total: 2,632
  - Density: 44/km^{2} (110/sq mi)
- Time zone: UTC+1 (CET)
  - Summer (DST): UTC+2 (CEST)
- Postal code: 6133
- Area code: 77

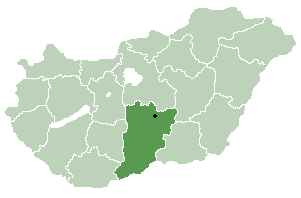
Location of Bács-Kiskun county in Hungary

Jászszentlászló is a village in Bács-Kiskun county, in the Southern Great Plain region of southern Hungary. It lies just south of Kiskunfélegyháza and just north of Kiskunmajsa. The town is a stop on the railroad line between Kecskemét and Baja.

== Geography ==
It covers an area of 60.34 km^{2} (23 sq mi) and has a population of 2632 people (2002).

== Economy ==
There are several agricultural enterprises. Some pumpjacks still raise crude oil from the ground.
