= Csány =

- Village (község)
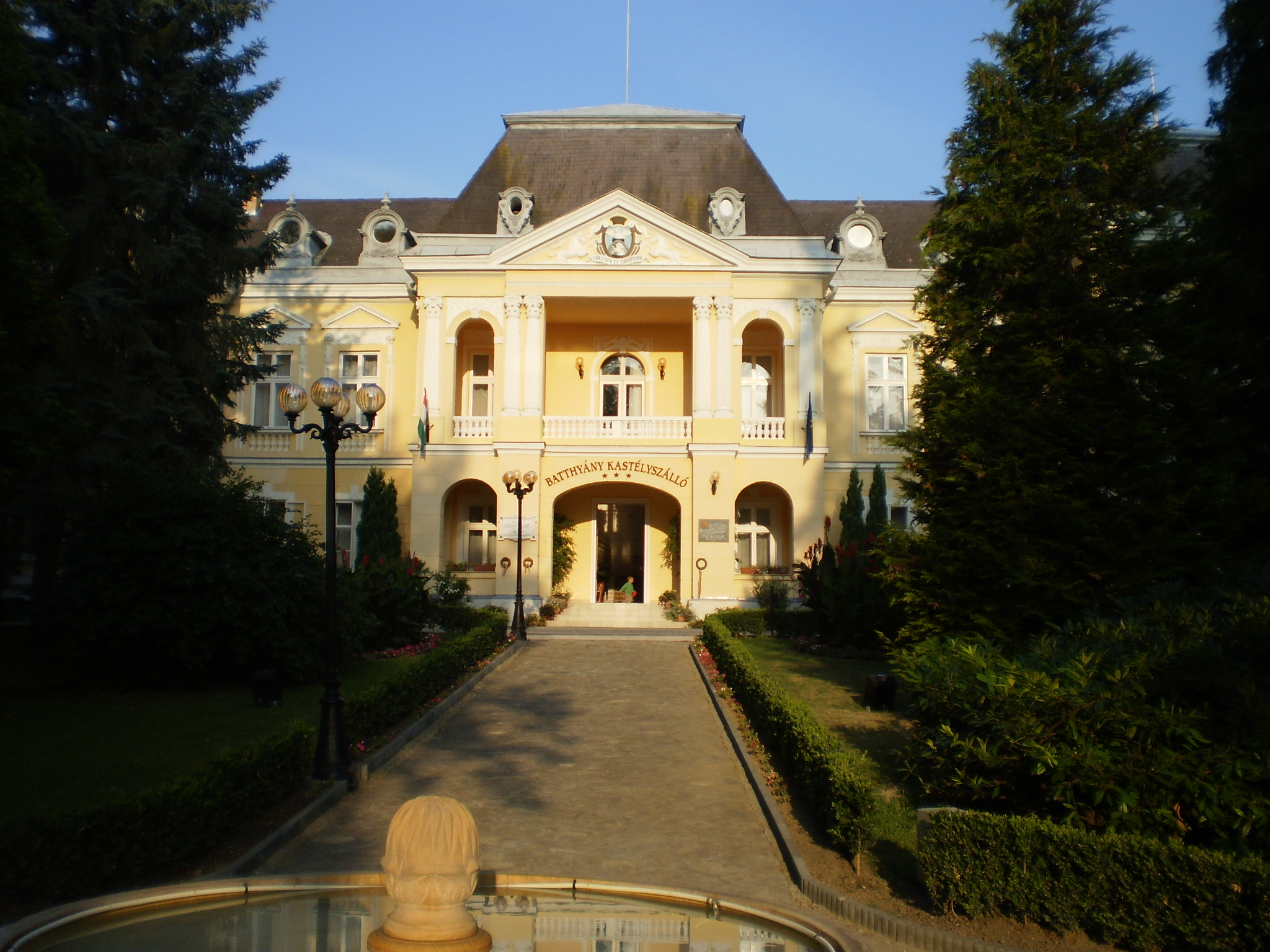

- Coat of arms

- Location of Heves County in Hungary

- Location of Csány in Hungary
- Coordinates: 47°38′42″N 19°49′30″E
- Country: Hungary
- Region: Northern Hungary
- County: Heves County
- Subregion: Hatvan District

Government
  - Mayor: István Medve

Area
  - Total: 47.89 km^{2} (18.49 sq mi)

Population (1 Jan. 2015)
  - Total: 2,118
  - Density: 43.12/km^{2} (111.7/sq mi)
- Time zone: UTC+1 (CET)
  - Summer (DST): UTC+2 (CEST)
- Postal code: 3015
- Area code: 37
- Website: www.csany.hu

Csány is a village in Heves County, Northern Hungary Region, Hungary.

In 2001, 93% of the population of the settlement identified themselves as Hungarian and 7% as Roma.

== Sights to visit ==
- Szigeti-castle
- Melon museum
- Church
- Halász castle (now home for old people)
