= Hort, Hungary =

Hort
- Village (község)
- Coat of arms

- Location of Heves County in Hungary

- Location of Hort in Hungary
- Coordinates: 47°41′24″N 19°46′48″E
- Country: Hungary
- Region: Northern Hungary
- County: Heves County
- Subregion: Hatvan District

Government
  - Mayor: Oszkár Kerek

Area
  - Total: 43.09 km^{2} (16.64 sq mi)

Population (1 Jan. 2015)
  - Total: 3,634
  - Density: 83.59/km^{2} (216.5/sq mi)
- Time zone: UTC+1 (CET)
  - Summer (DST): UTC+2 (CEST)
- Postal code: 3014
- Area code: 37
- Website: www.hort.hu

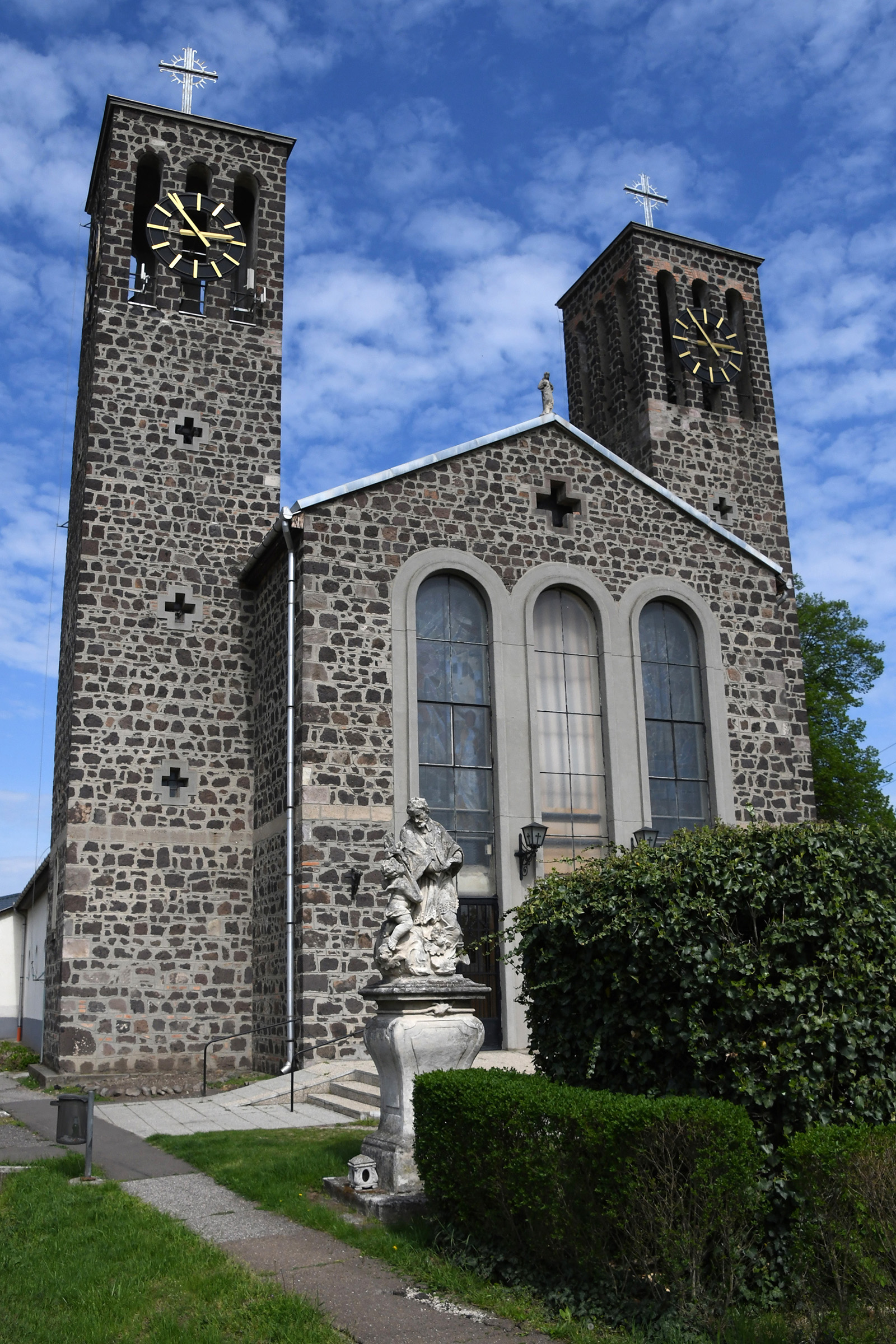
Roman Catholic church in Hort

Hort is a village in Heves County, Northern Hungary Region, Hungary.

== Sights to visit ==
- The catholic church
