= Józef Wysocki (general) =

Polish general

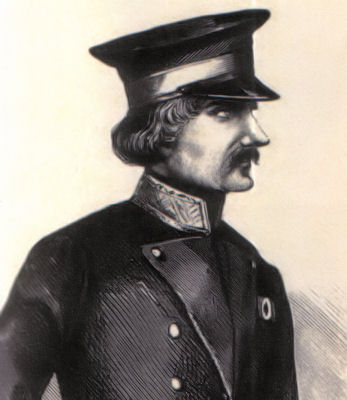
General Wysocki

Józef Wysocki (Hungarian: Wysocki József; 1809, Tulchyn – 1873, Paris) was a Polish general, soldier in the November Uprising of 1830, the Hungarian Revolution of 1848 and the January Uprising of 1863.
