= Cibakháza =

- Large village
- Flag Coat of arms

- Location within Hungary
- Coordinates: 46°57′12″N 20°12′04″E
- Country: Hungary
- County: Jász-Nagykun-Szolnok
- District: Kunszentmárton

Area
  - Total: 138.08 km^{2} (53.31 sq mi)

Population (2001)
  - Total: 4,400
  - Density: 25.51/km^{2} (66.1/sq mi)
- Time zone: UTC+1 (CET)
  - Summer (DST): UTC+2 (CEST)
- Postal code: 5462
- Area code(s): (+36) 56

Cibakháza is a large village in Jász-Nagykun-Szolnok county, in the Northern Great Plain region of central Hungary.

== Geography ==
It covers an area of 138.08 km^{2} (53 sq mi) and has a population of 3523 people (2001).
