= Zagyvaszántó =

- Village
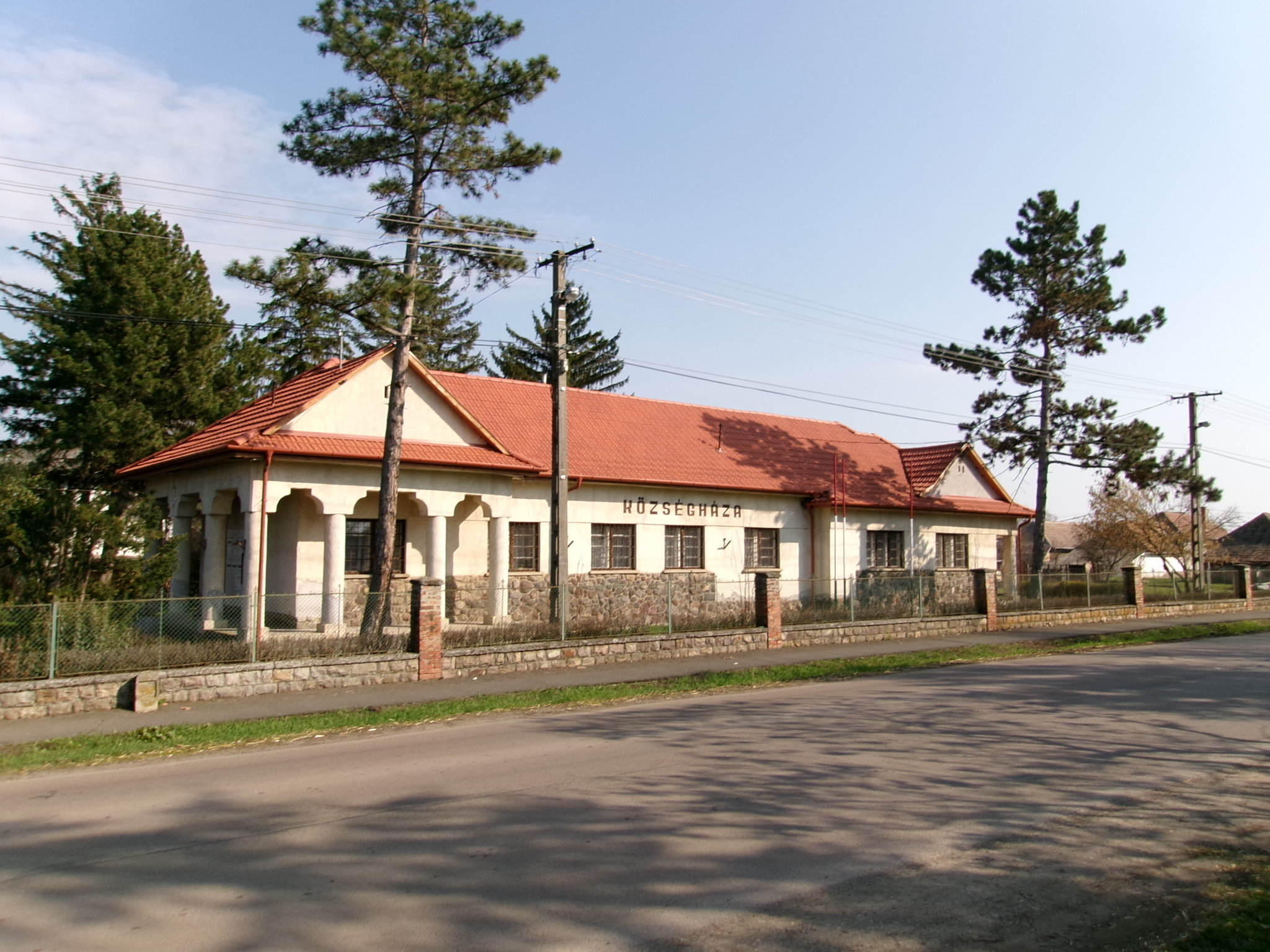
- Village hall

- Coat of arms

- Location in Hungary
- Coordinates: 47°46′23″N 19°40′05″E
- Country: Hungary
- County: Heves
- District: Hatvan
- First mentioned: 1290

Government
  - Mayor: László Fekete (Ind.)

Area
  - Total: 9.52 km^{2} (3.68 sq mi)

Population (2022)
  - Total: 1,825
  - Density: 192/km^{2} (497/sq mi)
- Time zone: UTC+1 (CET)
  - Summer (DST): UTC+2 (CEST)
- Postal code: 3031
- Area code: 37
- Website: www.zagyvaszanto.hu

Zagyvaszántó is a village in Heves County, Hungary, on the Zagyva river. As of the 2022 census, it has a population of 1825 (see Demographics). The village is located beside the (Nr. 81) Hatvan–Fiľakovo railway line and the main road 21 and 12.0 km away from the M3 motorway. The village has its own railway station under the name of Apc-Zagyvaszántó with public transport.

== History ==
Artifacts from the Bronze Age were found in the border of the settlement, which are linked to the Piliny culture. The village's name is first mentioned in a document dated 1290 as the estate of the bishop of Vác under the name "Zántho", which means field. The village was depopulated during the Turkish era, but in 1715 it was inhabited by 8 families. The landlords were Count Antal Grassalkovich, Tamás Roth and Hellebront family in 1770. Cholera destroyed the village in 1873. One of the owners of the village in 1880 was Rezső Schossberger, who was also the owner of the Selyp Sugar Factory. The village established a sister relationship in 1999 with Chiuruș what is part of Covasna.

== Demographics ==
According the 2022 census, 91.8% of the population were of Hungarian ethnicity, 0.8% were Gypsies and 8.2% were did not wish to answer. The religious distribution was as follows: 42.3% Roman Catholic, 3.2% Calvinist, 16.9% non-denominational, and 34.6% did not wish to answer. No population live in farms.

Population by years:

Year	1870	1880	1890	1900	1910	1920	1930	1941
Population	834	744	950	1073	1255	1307	1620	1584
Year	1949	1960	1970	1980	1990	2001	2011	2022
Population	1684	2009	2070	2168	2064	2144	1990	1825

== Politics ==
Mayors since 1990:

- 1990–2010: Alfréd Oldal (independent, expect between 1994 and 1998: supported by the MSZP)
- 2010–: László Fekete (until 2019 MSZP, from then independent)
